= European route E233 =

Road in trans-European E-road network

E233

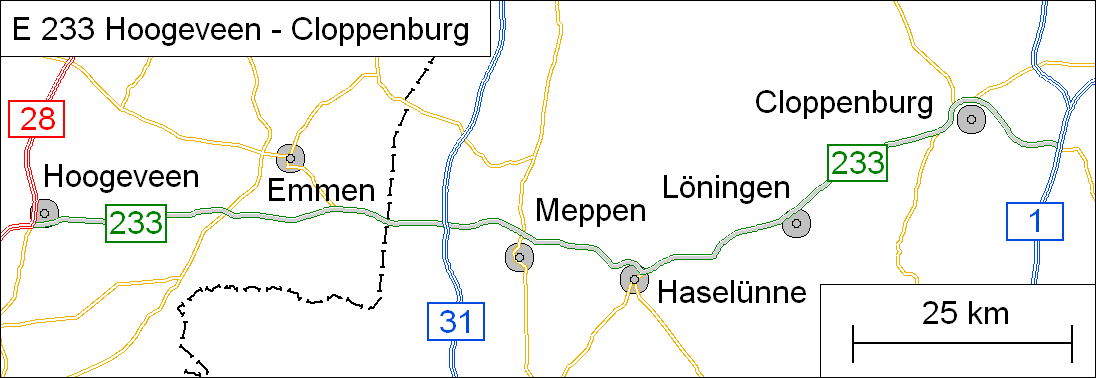
- E233 in the Netherlands

Route information
- Maintained by Rijkswaterstaat and BMVI
- Length: 128 km (80 mi)
- Existed: 15 March 1983–present

Major junctions
- From: E232 / A 28 / N 48 in Hoogeveen
- N 34 near Emmen; A 31 near Meppen; B 70 in Meppen; B 213 in Haselünne; B 68 near Cloppenburg; B 72 in Cloppenburg
- To: E37 / A 1 near Emstek

Location
- Countries: Netherlands; Germany

Highway system
- International E-road network; A Class; B Class
← E232	→ E234

European route E 233 (E 233) is a west—east European Class-B road part of the International E-road network, running from Hoogeveen in the Netherlands to Cloppenburg in Germany, passing by the Dutch city of Emmen and the German city of Meppen. The road runs concurrently with four other roads over its course, first with the Dutch A37 from its western terminus to the German border, then with the German B402 up to Haselünne, from there on it follows B213 up to northern Cloppenburg, and on the last 2 kilometres (1.2 mi) of the B213 concurrency it also runs concurrent with B72, which it then follows up to its eastern terminus at the A1, which is also part of E 37. The road has a total length of 132 kilometres (82 mi), of which 41 kilometres (25 mi) in the Netherlands and 91 kilometres (57 mi) in Germany.

E 233 was first proposed as "E 232 Oldenzaal—Bremen" in the European Agreement on main international traffic arteries (AGR) in 1975, which was put into force in 1983. After a realignment and renumbering it follows its current course.

The Dutch section of the highway is maintained by Rijkswaterstaat. The German section is maintained by the BMVI.

== Route description ==
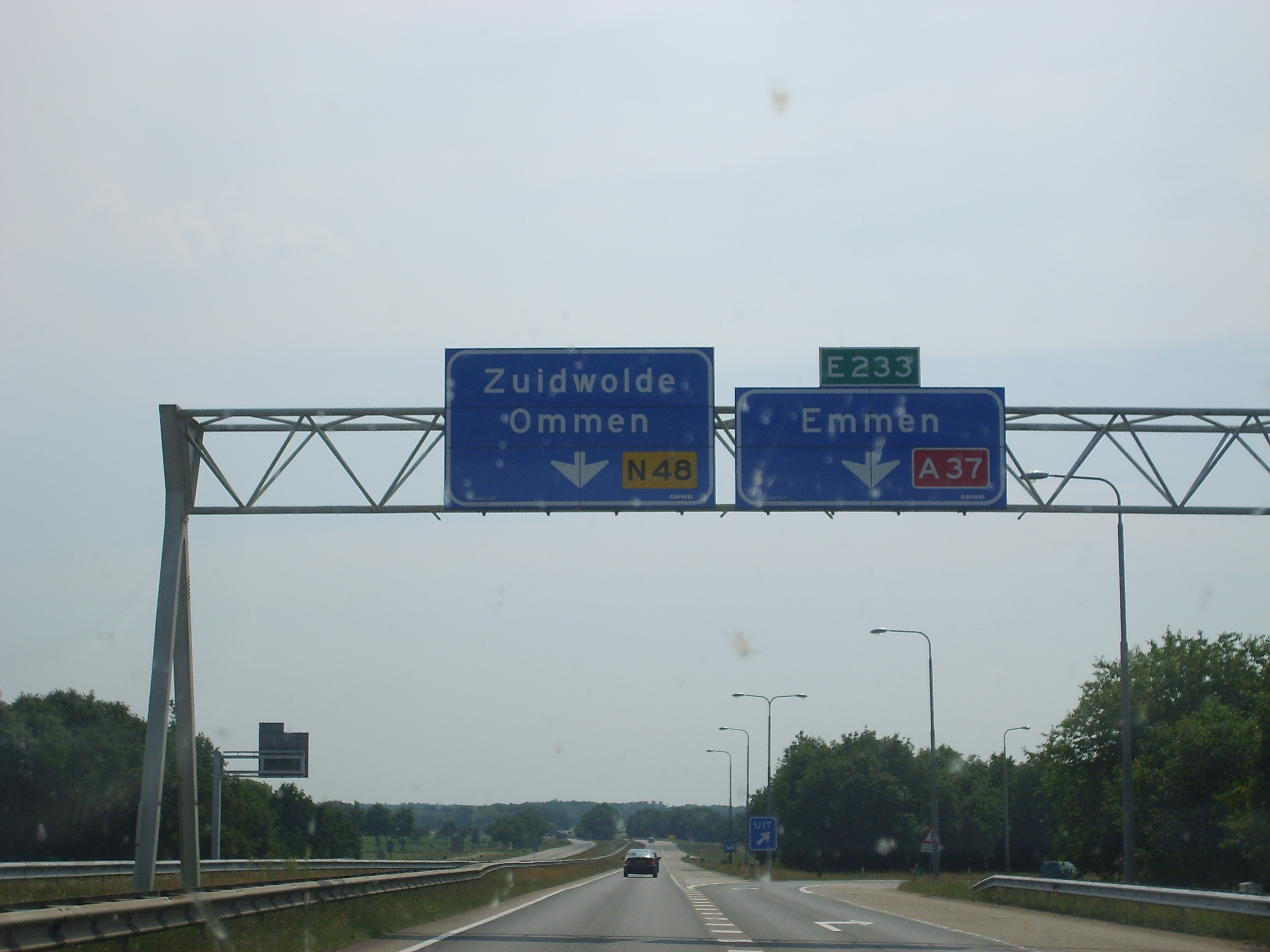
Approaching Hoogeveen interchange from the north

European route E233 starts as a motorway with two lanes in each direction and grade separated intersections at Hoogeveen Interchange in the Netherlands, where E232, concurrent with A28, arrives from the west and continues north, and N48 goes south, southwest of Hoogeveen. The road goes east, concurrent with A37, passing by a few minor villages including Nieuwlande, Dalen and Oosterhesselen. It then passes under N34 at Holsloot Interchange. After that it continues east, passing by Veenoord, where it passes over the Zwolle–Emmen railway line, and Klazienaveen. From there on it is only 6 kilometres (3.7 mi) to the German border, where A37 stops, and the road starts running concurrent with the German B402. There is no border control. The road keeps going east, where it soon passes over the German A31. From this interchange on, E233, still concurrent with B402, is laid out as expressway with one lane in each directions and mostly at grade intersections. It passes over B70, north of Meppen, and continues further to the east until it gets to Haselünne, where it functions as the northern part of the ring road around Haselünne. East of Haselünne at the intersection with B213, E233 will now continue northeast toward Cloppenburg, concurrent with B213, while B402 will continue to the south. It passes by Löningen and Lastrup, until it gets to the intersection with B68, where B68 goes south. From here on there are two lanes in each direction again with grade separated intersections, and the road functions as the northern part of the ring road around Cloppenburg. North of Cloppenburg, B72 arrives from the north, and continues east, concurrent with E233 and B213. A few kilometers to the east, B213 branches of to the northeast, meaning E233 is now only concurrent with B72. From here on there is only one lane in each direction with at grade intersections again. The road goes southeast, passing Emstek to the south until it gets to its eastern terminus at an interchange with E37, concurrent with A1 going from north to south, and B69 continuing east. This is also the terminus of B72, the road that ran concurrent over the last stretch of E233.

== History ==
In 1975 the road, then called E 232, was planned to run from Oldenzaal to Bremen, passing by Haselünne. The 1975 planned version of E 233, which is now called E 234, ran from Bremerhaven to Walsrode, passing by Bremen. These plans were put into force on 15 March 1983. E 232 was renamed to its current name, i.e. E 233, in 1987. The road that was called E 233 before that was also renamed to E 234 at the same time, and extended northward to Cuxhaven. Because the Dutch A1 motorway was being connected to the German A30 motorway in 1994, the section of E 233 from Oldenzaal to Haselünne will see a substantial drop in international traffic, which is why the alignment of E 233 was changed to its current alignment running from Hoogeveen, passing by Haselünne, to its terminus on the German A1 east of Cloppenburg.

In the Netherlands, road A37, the road that runs concurrently with E 233, used to be an expressway with at grade intersections. It was called N37 back then, N meaning "niet-autosnelweg" ("non motorway"). Already before E 233 followed this route, the decision was made to make the entirety of A37 into a motorway with only grade separated intersections and two lanes in each direction. Construction started in February 1995, and during its construction sections that became motorway were already renumbered to A37. All sections of this road were officially a motorway on 21 January 2008, meaning it was now also numbered A37 on the entire route.

The stretch of B402 from the border between the Netherlands and Germany to the intersection with the German A31 was upgraded from a two-lane road with at grade intersections to a four-lane road with grade separated intersections between 2005 and 2007.

In 1975, when E 233 was first aligned, it ran through Lastrup. On December 5, 2009, B213 was realigned to a bypass around Lastrup with grade separated intersections.

At the time E 233 was first aligned, it went straight through Cloppenburg. Construction on a bypass around Cloppenburg on which B213 / B72 and thus E 233 would be realigned began as early as 1977. The first part, from Löninger Straße up to the current intersection where B213 stops running concurrent with E 233 was opened in 1979. The second section from the end of the first section to the intersection with Alte Bundesstraße was opened in 1984.

== Future ==
The German part of the highway between A31 near the Dutch border and E233's eastern terminus at A1 will be upgraded to four lanes, two in each direction, with grade separated intersections. It currently only has one lane in each direction with at grade intersections.

== Exit list ==
=== In the Netherlands ===
Province	Municipality	km	mi	Exit	Name	Destinations	Notes
Drenthe	Hoogeveen	0.0	0.0	—	Hoogeveen interchange	E232 / A 28 / N 48 south – Zwolle, Ommen, Assen, Utrecht	West end of A37 overlap
Drenthe	Hoogeveen	3.6	2.2	1	Hoogeveen-Oost	Meester Cramerweg / Weg Om de Oost	
Drenthe	Hoogeveen	9.9	6.2	2	Nieuwlande	Johannes Poststraat	
Drenthe	Coevorden	18.3	11.4	3	Oosterhesselen	N 854 (Oosterhesselerweg) – Oosterhesselen, Wachtum, Dalen	
Drenthe	Coevorden	22.2	13.8	—	Holsloot interchange	N 34 – Coevorden, Hardenberg, Emmen, Groningen	
Drenthe	Emmen	26.0	16.2	4	Veenoord	N 376 north (Boerdijk) / Boerdijk – Veenoord, Nieuw-Amsterdam, Drenthe	
Drenthe	Emmen	28.5	17.7	5	Emmen-Zuid	N 853 south (Vierslagenweg) / Dikkewijk Oostzijde – Schoonebeek, Erica	
Drenthe	Emmen	35.3	21.9	6	Klazienaveen	N 862 – Klazienaveen, Nieuw-Dordrecht	
Drenthe	Emmen	39.8	24.7	7	Zwartemeer	N 379 north / Zuidervaart Oostzijde – Zwartemeer, Barger-Compascuum	
Drenthe	Emmen	42.1	26.2	—	—	E233 east / B 402 east – Meppen	Continuation into Germany; east end of A37 overlap
1.000 mi = 1.609 km; 1.000 km = 0.621 mi: Concurrency terminus

=== In Germany ===
State	District	Location	km	mi	Destinations	Notes
Lower Saxony	Emsland	Twist	15	9.3	E233 west / A 37 west – Emmen, Hoogeveen	Continuation into the Netherlands; west end of B402 overlap
Lower Saxony	Emsland	Twist	15	9.3	Heinrick-Krüssel-Straße	Westbound entrance and exit only
Lower Saxony	Emsland	Twist	13	8.1	K202 (Fehndorfer Straße / Franziskusstraße) – Altenberge, Twist	
Lower Saxony	Emsland	Meppen	8	5.0	A 31 – Oberhausen, Haren, Leer	
Lower Saxony	Emsland	Meppen	0	0.0	B 70 / K247 – Meppen, Lathen, Lingen	
Lower Saxony	Emsland	Haselünne	16– 22	9.9– 14	B 213 / B 402 – Haselünne, Lingen	East end of B402 overlap; west end of B213 overlap
Lower Saxony	Cloppenburg	Cloppenburg	54.239	33.703	B 68 south – Bramsche, Osnabrück	
Lower Saxony	Cloppenburg	Cloppenburg	52.314	32.506	Löninger Straße	
Lower Saxony	Cloppenburg	Cloppenburg	51.305	31.879	Molberger Straße	
Lower Saxony	Cloppenburg	Cloppenburg	49.948	31.036	B 72 north / Friesoyther Straße – Friesoythe, Cloppenburg	West end of B72 overlap
Lower Saxony	Cloppenburg	Cloppenburg	47.773	29.685	B 213 north (Ahlhorner Straße) / Bether Straße – Oldenburg (city), Bremen, Cloppenburg	East end of B213 overlap
Lower Saxony	Cloppenburg	Cloppenburg	45.768	28.439	K168 east (Cloppenburger Straße) / Industriezubringer – Cloppenburg	
Lower Saxony	Cloppenburg	Emstek	42.124	26.175	L836 (Alte Bundesstraße) – Emstek	
Lower Saxony	Cloppenburg	Emstek	36.488	22.673	L836 north (Emsteker Straße) / ecopark-Allee – Emstek	
Lower Saxony	Cloppenburg	Emstek	12.893	8.011	E37 / A 1 / B 69 east (Emsteker Straße) – Oldenburg (city), Bremen, Vechta, Osnabrück	East end of B72 overlap
1.000 mi = 1.609 km; 1.000 km = 0.621 mi: Concurrency terminus; Incomplete access
