= European route E232 =

Road in trans-European E-road network

E232

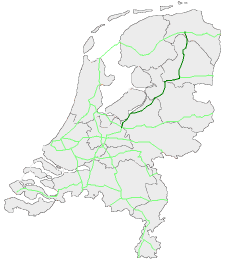
- European routes in the Netherlands with E 232 in dark green

Route information
- Maintained by Rijkswaterstaat

Major junctions
- South end: E30 / E231 / A 1 / A 28 in Amersfoort

- A 50 / N 50 in Hattem; A 32 near Meppel; E233 / A 37 / N 48 in Hoogeveen
- North end: E22 / N 7 in Groningen

Location
- Countries: Netherlands

Highway system
- International E-road network; A Class; B Class

The E 232 is a European B class road in the Netherlands, connecting the cities of Amersfoort and Groningen.

The highway is maintained by Rijkswaterstaat.

== Highway connections ==
The E 232 has a total length of 174 kilometres, and serves as the connector between the E 30 and the E 22 (hence its number). From south to north the following highways share junctions with the E 232:

- E30 (Highway 1) – Hoevelaken
- E231 (Highway 1) – Hoevelaken
- N94 (Highway 302) – Harderwijk
- N93 (Highway 50) – Hattemerbroek
- N90(Z) (Highway 35) – Zwollerkerspel
- N90(N) (Highway 32) – Lankhorst
- E233 (Highway 37) – Hoogeveen
- RW48 – Hoogeveen
- RW33 – Assen-Zuid
- RW34 – Zuidlaren
- E22 (Highway 7) – Julianaplein (Groningen)

The entire route is constructed as a motorway.

Before the renumbering of the E-roads in the 1980s, this route was part of the E 35.

== Exit list ==
Province	Municipality	km	mi	Exit	Name	Destinations	Notes
Utrecht	Amersfoort			—	Hoevelaken Interchange	E30 / E231 west / A 1 / A 28 – Amersfoort, Utrecht, Amsterdam, Apeldoorn	South end of A28 overlap
Gelderland	Nijkerk			8a	Amersfoort-Vathorst / Nijkerk-Zuid	Verbindingsweg	
Gelderland	Nijkerk			9	Nijkerk	N 301 (Berencamperweg) – Nijkerk, Putten, Zeewolde	
Gelderland	Putten			10	Strand Nulde	Hoornsdam / Strandboulevard	
Gelderland	Ermelo			11	Hardewijk-Zuid	Buitenbrinkweg / Spijkweg / Palmbosweg	
Gelderland	Harderwijk			12	Ermelo	N 303 south (Harderwijkerweg) / Oranjelaan – Ermelo, Harderwijk	
Gelderland	Harderwijk			13	Lelystad	N 302 (Ceintuurbaan) – Lelystad, Harderwijk	
Gelderland	Nunspeet			14	Elspeet	N 310 (Elspeterweg) – Elspeet, Nunspeet	
Gelderland	Nunspeet			15	Epe	N 795 east / Eperweg – Epe	
Gelderland	Elburg			16	't Harde	N 309 (Eperweg) – 't Harde, Elburg, Dronten, Oldebroek	
Gelderland	Oldebroek			17	Wezep	N 308 west / Zuiderzeestraatweg – Wezep	
Gelderland	Oldebroek			—	Hattemerbroek Interchange	A 50 south / N 50 north – Kampen, Emmeloord, Apeldoorn	
Overijssel	Zwolle			18	Zwolle-Zuid	N 331 west / N 337 east – Zwolle South, Hasselt, Almelo	
Overijssel	Zwolle			19	Zwolle-Centrum	Katerdijk / Burgemeester Roelenweg	
Overijssel	Zwolle			20	Zwolle-Noord	N 35 south / Zwartewaterallee – Zwolle North, Almelo	
Overijssel	Ommen			21	Ommen	N 340 east / Ordelseweg / Nieuwleusenerdijk – Ommen, Dalfsen, Hardenberg	
Overijssel	Dalfsen			22	Nieuwleusen	N 377 (Hasselterweg / Nieuwe Dedemsvaartweg) / Hermelenweg / Lichtmisweg / Oude Rijksweg – Nieuwleusen, Dedemsvaart, Hasselt	
Overijssel	Staphorst			23	Staphorst	Achthoevenweg / Oude Rijksweg	
Overijssel	Staphorst			—	Lankhorst Interchange	A 32 north – Leeuwarden, Heerenveen, Meppel	
Drenthe	De Wolden			24	De Wijk	N 851 west / Hessenweg – De Wijk	
Drenthe	De Wolden			25	Zuidwolde	Willem Moesweg	Eastbound exit and westbound entrance only
Drenthe	De Wolden			25	Zuidwolde	Echtenseweg	Westbound exit and eastbound entrance only
Drenthe	Hoogeveen			—	Hoogeveen Interchange	E233 east / A 37 east / N 48 south – Meppen, Emmen, Hoogeveen-Oost, Ommen	
Drenthe	Hoogeveen			26	Hoogeveen	Zuidwoldigerweg / Schutstraat	
Drenthe	Hoogeveen			27	Fluitenberg	N 374 east / Fluitenbergseweg – Fluitenberg	
Drenthe	Hoogeveen			28	Pesse	N 375 west / Dorpsstraat – Ruinen, Pesse	
Drenthe	Westerveld			29	Dwingeloo	N 855 west (spieregerweg) / Wijsterseweg – Dwingeloo, Spier, Wijster	
Drenthe	Midden-Drenthe			30	Beilen	Kanaalweg / Domoweg / Ossebroeken / Beilervaart	
Drenthe	Midden-Drenthe			31	Westerbork	N 381 – Westerbork, Hooghalen, Drachten	
Drenthe	Midden-Drenthe			31a	Assen-Zuid	Eysinkweg / Burgemeester Masmanweg	
Drenthe	Assen			32	Assen-Zuid	N 33 east / Haarweg – Assen, Eemshaven, Veendam, Gieten	
Drenthe	Assen			33	Assen	N 371 west (Balkenweg) / Balkenweg / Balkendwarsweg – Assen-West, Smilde, Norg	
Drenthe	Assen			34	Assen-Noord	Asserstraat / Engelandlaan / Peelo Oost / Peelo	
Drenthe	Tynaarlo			35	Vries	N 386 (Zuidlaarderweg / Vriezerweg) / Dorpsstraat – Vries, Tynaarlo, Zuidlaren, Roden	
Drenthe	Tynaarlo			36	Zuidlaren	N 34 east – Zuidlaren, Gieten, Emmen	Southbound exit and northbound entrance only
Drenthe	Tynaarlo			37	Eelde	Groningerstraat / Punterweg	
Groningen	Groningen			38	Haren	N 861 west (Meerweg) / Emmalaan / Vondellaan – Haren, Paterswolde	
Groningen	Groningen			39	Groningen-Zuid	Van Ketwich Verschuurlaan	
Groningen	Groningen			—	Julianaplein Interchange	E22 / N 7 / Emmaviaduct / Brailleweg / Vondellaan – Drachten, Groningen, Oldenburg (city), Delfzijl	North end of A28 overlap
1.000 mi = 1.609 km; 1.000 km = 0.621 mi: Concurrency terminus; Incomplete access
