= E233 =

E233 may refer to:

- Thiabendazole, a food additive
- E233 series, a Japanese train type
- European route E233, a European Class-B road in the Netherlands and Germany
