= European route E37 =

Road in trans-European E-road network

E37

Route information
- Length: 336 km (209 mi)

Major junctions
- North end: Bremen
- South end: Cologne

Location
- Countries: Germany

Highway system
- International E-road network; A Class; B Class

European route E37 is a series of roads in Germany, that is part of the United Nations International E-road network.

It connects Bremen and Cologne (German: Köln), both in Germany.

The route leaves Bremen, where it connects to the E22, the E233 and the E234. It then heads immediately south-west, with the first major settlement it passes through being Osnabrück in the German state of Lower Saxony (German: Niedersachsen), where it links with the European Route E30. It then heads south, entering North Rhine-Westphalia (German: Nordrhein-Westfalen) and passing through the city of Dortmund and connecting to the E34, the E41 and the E331.

It then heads south through North Rhine-Westphalia, reaching its final destination of Cologne, where it links to the E29, the E31, the E35, and the E40, enabling travel to France, Luxembourg, the Netherlands, Switzerland, Italy, Belgium, and even as far as Poland and Russia.

Its total length is 336 km (209 mi).
