= Elim, Drenthe =

Elim
- Village
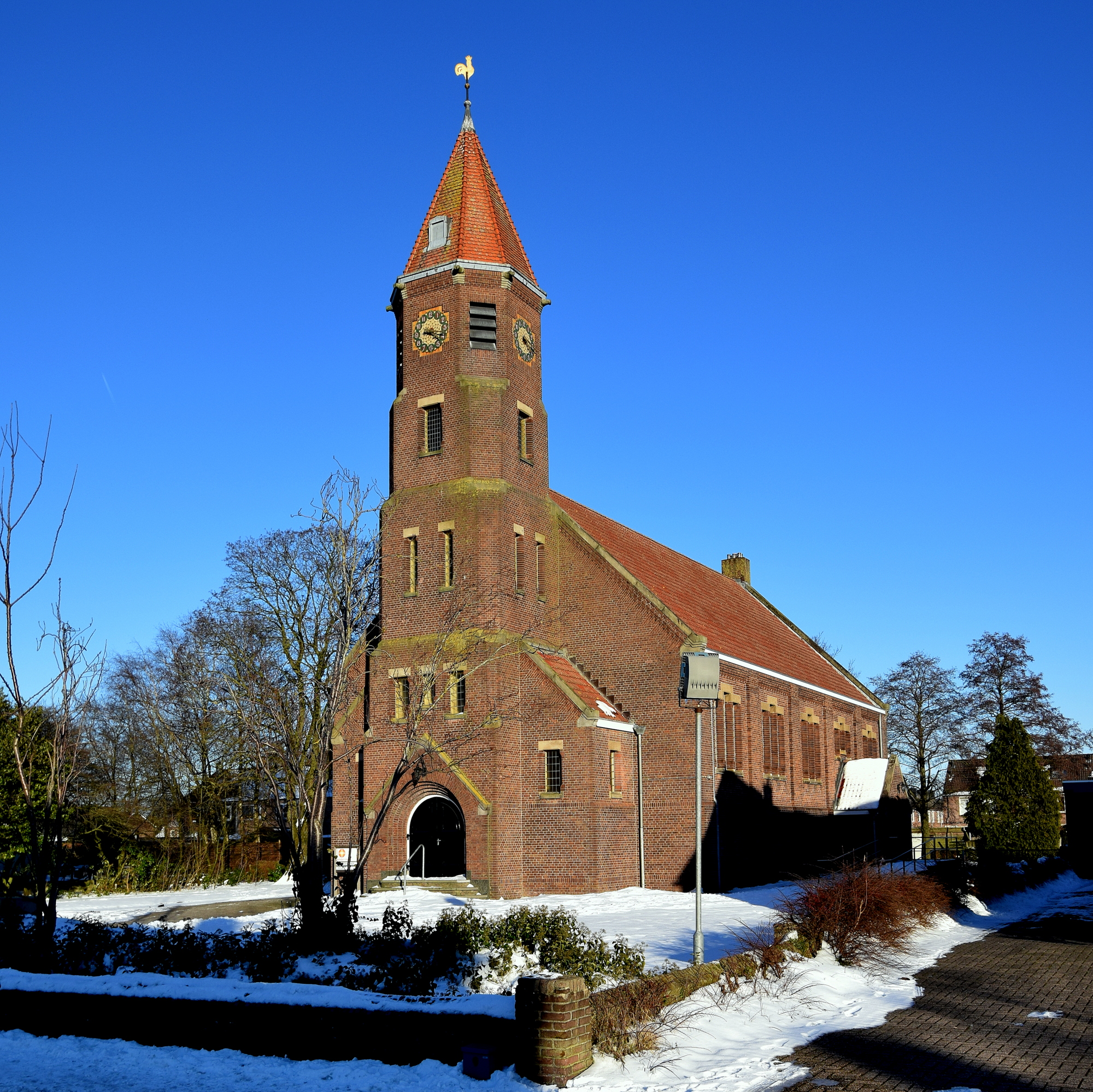
- Church in Elim

- Flag

- Location in province of Drenthe in the Netherlands Elim (Netherlands)
- Coordinates: 52.6799°N 6.5776°E
- Country: Netherlands
- Province: Drenthe
- Municipality: Hoogeveen

Area
  - Total: 13.12 km^{2} (5.07 sq mi)
- Elevation: 12 m (39 ft)

Population (2021)
  - Total: 2,335
  - Density: 178.0/km^{2} (460.9/sq mi)
- Time zone: UTC+1 (CET)
  - Summer (DST): UTC+2 (CEST)
- Postal code: 7916
- Dialing code: 0528

Elim is a village in Drenthe (province of The Netherlands) and is part of the Hoogeveen municipality.

== History ==
Before 1786, there were only swamps in this part of the Netherlands. After the drainage of the swamps, people started to harvest peat, which was transported to the west of the Netherlands. The people who harvested the peat built houses on the land and started a small community, on the present place of Elim, called "Het Dwarsgat". In 1915, the village became known as Elim. The name Elim is from the Bible, Exodus 15:27 : "there were twelve wells of water, and seventy date palms," and the Israelites "camped there near the water".
