= A37 motorway (Netherlands) =

Motorway connecting Hoogeveen with Emmen and the German border near Zwartemeer

Coordinates: 52.728392°N 6.756334°E

A37 motorway
- Rijksweg 37
- Location of the A37 motorway

Major junctions
- West end: A28/N48 in Hoogeveen
- East end: Emmen; B 402 border with Germany

Location
- Country: Kingdom of the Netherlands
- Constituent country: Netherlands

Highway system
- Roads in the Netherlands; Motorways; E-roads; Provincial; City routes

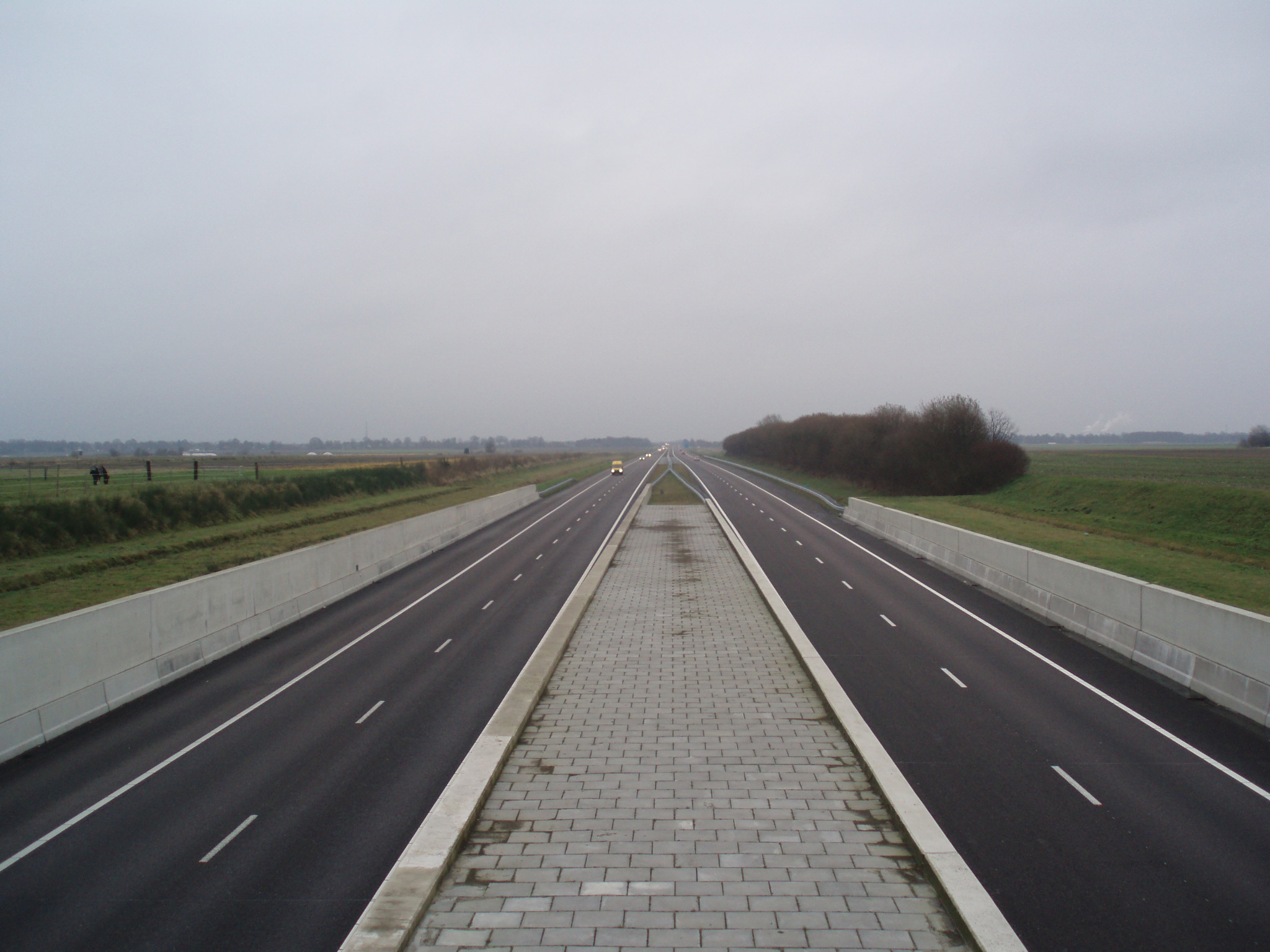
A37 seen from the viaduct "Erica".

The A37 motorway is a motorway in the Netherlands. It is approximately 42 kilometers in length. The A37 is located entirely in the Dutch province of Drenthe.

The A37 connects the city of Hoogeveen with Emmen and the German border (Twist, Germany) near Zwartemeer. At the border, the road continues as the German road B402, which connects to the German A31 a few kilometers east of the border.

Along the entire length of the motorway, the European route E233 follows the A37.

== History ==
Until 2003, the main connection between Hoogeveen and the German B402 road was the two-laned N37 highway. In that year, construction of the motorway finished on the section between interchanges Hoogeveen and Holsloot and that part of the road, now upgraded from 'N37' to 'A37', was opened to traffic. Since October 2007, the remaining stretch between Holsloot and the German border has also been upgraded from highway N37 to motorway A37.

== Exit list ==
Province	Municipality	Km.	#	Name	Roads	Notes
Drenthe	Hoogeveen	0		Interchange Hoogeveen	A28, N48	
Drenthe	Hoogeveen	4	1	Hoogeveen-Oost		Oost means east
Drenthe	Hoogeveen	10	2	Nieuwlande		
Drenthe	Coevorden	19	3	Oosterhesselen		
Drenthe	Coevorden	23		Interchange Holsloot	N34	
Drenthe	Emmen	26	4	Veenoord	N376	
Drenthe	Emmen	29	5	Schoonebeek		
Drenthe	Emmen	36	6	Klazienaveen		
Drenthe	Emmen	40	7	Zwartemeer	N379	
Border with Germany; this road continues as the German B402.
