= Provincial road N34 (Netherlands) =

Highway in the Netherlands

Provincial highway 34
- Provinciale weg 34
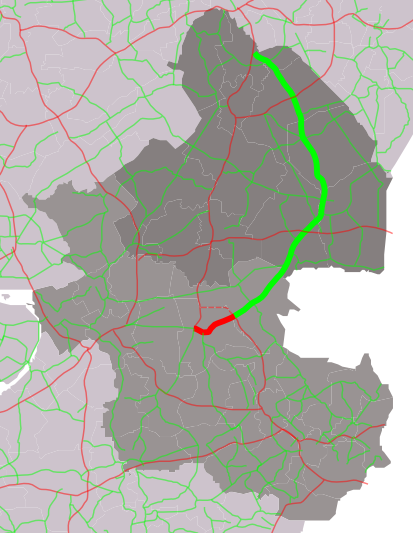
- Location of the N34 provincial road

Route information
- Length: 77 km (48 mi)
- Existed: May 29, 1951–present

Major junctions
- North end: De Punt
- A 28 / E232 – Groningen A 37 / E233 – Holsloot
- South end: Ommen

Location
- Country: Kingdom of the Netherlands
- Constituent country: Netherlands
- Provinces: Drenthe, Overijssel

Highway system
- Roads in the Netherlands; Motorways; E-roads; Provincial; City routes

Provincial road N34 is a Dutch provincial road that links the N36 near Ommen, Overijssel to Rijksweg 28 near De Punt, Drenthe. The entire road is an expressway, of which the part between Coevorden and Emmen-West (the junction with the N391) consists of two lanes in each direction.

== Route description ==
The N34 starts in the north in De Punt where it cuts off from the A28 in the province Drenthe and ends in the south in Ommen where it continues as the R105 in the province of Overijssel. At the White Pole between Ommen and Hardenberg, the N36 crosses the N34. At the grade-separated Interchange Holsloot, the A37 crosses the N34, also the N33 crosses the N34 with roads that are grade-separated. In Drenthe the N34 is also known as the Hunebed Highway, because of the many hunebeds near the N34. They even have signs suggesting an American Interstate. The most important cities alongside the N34 are Ommen, Hardenberg, Coevorden, Emmen, Borger, Gieten, Annen and Zuidlaren.

== History and future ==
The route of the N34 has a steeped history. There has been a road for centuries that connects the same locations as the N34 does. This is mainly because a large part of the road is located on the Hondsrug. This ridge crossed above the swamps that were on either side, and habitation was mainly concentrated on the Hondsrug. In 2010 the N34 was rerouted around Ommen to reduce the traffic load in the city and the hamlet of Hoogengraven; the road used to go through Ommen.

The interchange with the N33 used to be a roundabout, but because this is the provincial road with the most accidents by date and especially that crossing, Rijkswaterstaat decided to make it a grade-separated interchange; this also resulted in a better flow of traffic.

Because the N34 is known as a dangerous road (a dodenweg in Dutch) a lot of changes were made over the last few years. Crossings were adjusted so the N34 has no more same-level-junctions anymore. From Ommen to Coevorden it is prohibited to overtake for 18 kilometer as part to make the road more safe. The N34 used to run to the town center of Ommen, but now ends a couple of kilometres east of the town. The original route was downgraded into a recreational route, and traffic now has to use the new northward extension of the N36 to get around Ommen.

Because the road is an important road between bigger cities/towns in the eastern part of the Netherlands, where Enschede, Hengelo, Almelo, Vriezenveen, Ommen, Hardenberg, Coevorden, Emmen, Borger and Groningen are connected with each other, the both provinces want to double the road on four places to discourage an overtake and ease the traffic. At least the part between Coevorden-Noord and Emmen (where the N34 meets the N381) will be doubled before 2022.

== Junction and exit list ==
Province	Municipality	km	mi	Destinations	Notes
Drenthe	Tynaarlo	0	0.0	A 28 / E232 – De Punt	Joins road A28/E232 to Groningen
Drenthe	Tynaarlo	4	2.5	N 386 – Zuidlaren	
Drenthe	Aa en Hunze	10	6.2	Anloo/Annen	
Drenthe	Aa en Hunze	15	9.3	N 33 – Assen, Delfzijl	
Drenthe	Aa en Hunze	16	9.9	Gieten	
Drenthe	Aa en Hunze	19	12	N 378 – Gasselte	
Drenthe	Borger-Odoorn	25	16	N 374 – Borger	
Drenthe	Borger-Odoorn	27	17	Eeserveen	
Drenthe	Borger-Odoorn	28	17	Ees	
Drenthe	Borger-Odoorn	30	19	Exloo	
Drenthe	Borger-Odoorn	33	21	Odoorn/Valthe	
Drenthe	Borger-Odoorn	39	24	Emmen-Noord/Klijndijk	
Drenthe	Emmen	42	26	N 381 – Emmen	
Drenthe	Emmen	45	28	N 391 – Emmen-West	
Drenthe	Coevorden	47	29	N 376 – Erm	
Drenthe	Coevorden	50	31	A 37 / E233 – Interchange Holsloot	
Drenthe	Coevorden	53	33	N 854 – Dalen	
Drenthe	Coevorden	57	35	N 382 – Coevorden-Noord	
Drenthe	Coevorden	59	37	N 377 – Coevorden	
Overijssel	Hardenberg	66	41	Gramsbergen	
Overijssel	Hardenberg	70	43	Hardenberg-Noord/Hoogenweg	
Overijssel	Hardenberg	72	45	N 343 – Hardenberg	
Overijssel	Hardenberg	77	48	N 36 / R 105 – White Pole	Continues as road R105 to Ommen
Overijssel	1.000 mi = 1.609 km; 1.000 km = 0.621 mi				
