= Pesse =

- Village
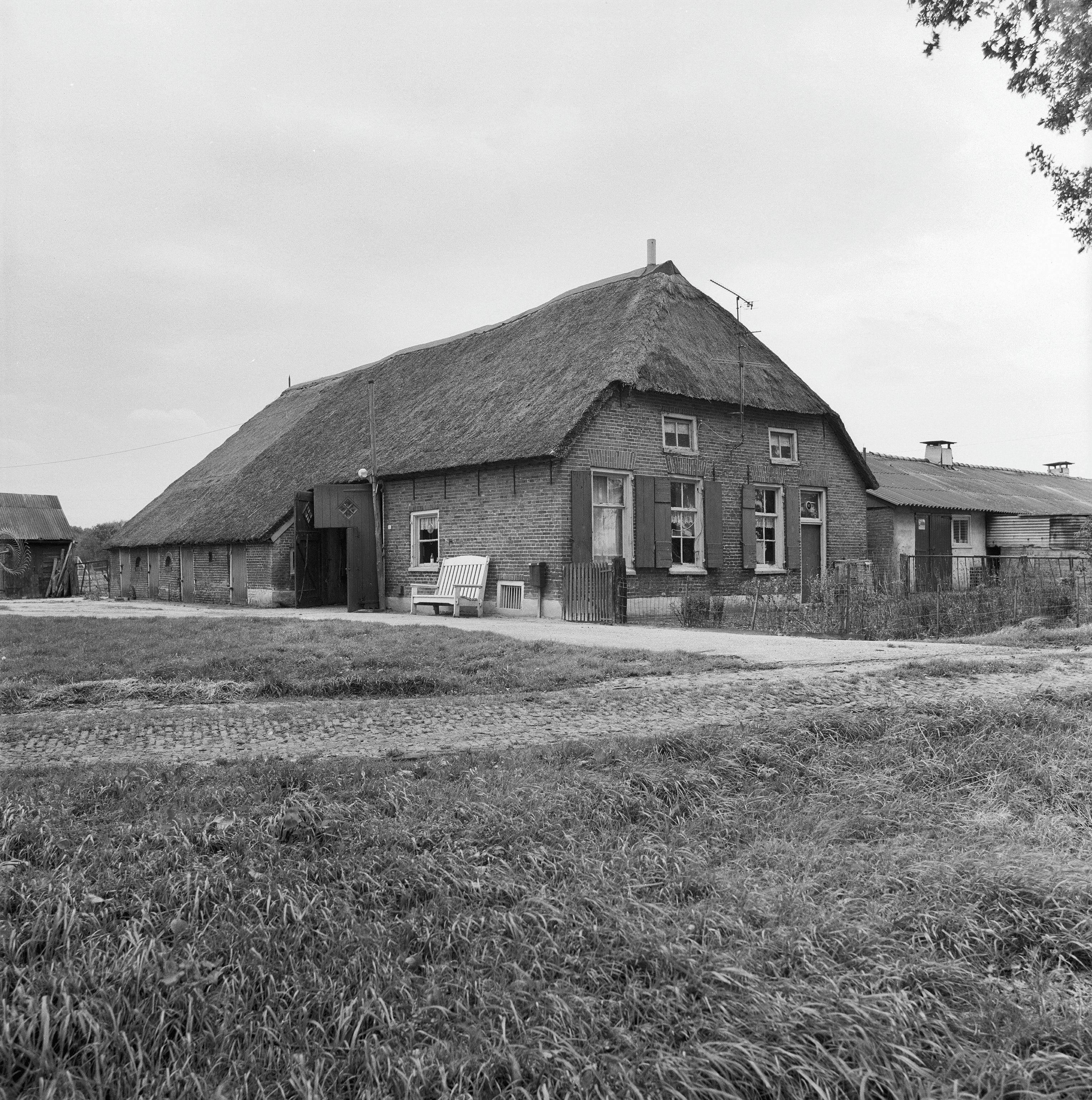
- Farm in Pesse

- Location in province of Drenthe in the Netherlands Pesse (Netherlands)
- Coordinates: 52°46′18″N 6°27′2″E
- Country: Netherlands
- Province: Drenthe
- Municipality: Hoogeveen

Area
  - Total: 21.24 km^{2} (8.20 sq mi)
- Elevation: 13 m (43 ft)

Population (2021)
  - Total: 1,840
  - Density: 86.6/km^{2} (224/sq mi)
- Time zone: UTC+1 (CET)
  - Summer (DST): UTC+2 (CEST)
- Postal code: 7933
- Dialing code: 0528

Pesse is a village in the Dutch province of Drenthe. It is located in the municipality of Hoogeveen.

== Overview ==
Pesse is an esdorp which developed in the Middle Ages. It was first mentioned in 1217, as Petthe. The etymology is unclear.

The village is mainly known for the Pesse canoe, believed to be the world's oldest known boat. Carbon dating indicates that the boat was constructed during the early Mesolithic period between 8040 BCE and 7510 BCE. It is currently housed in the Drents Museum in Assen, Netherlands. The canoe was found during the construction of the nearby A28.
