= Mark Strolenberg =

Dutch politician (born 1979)

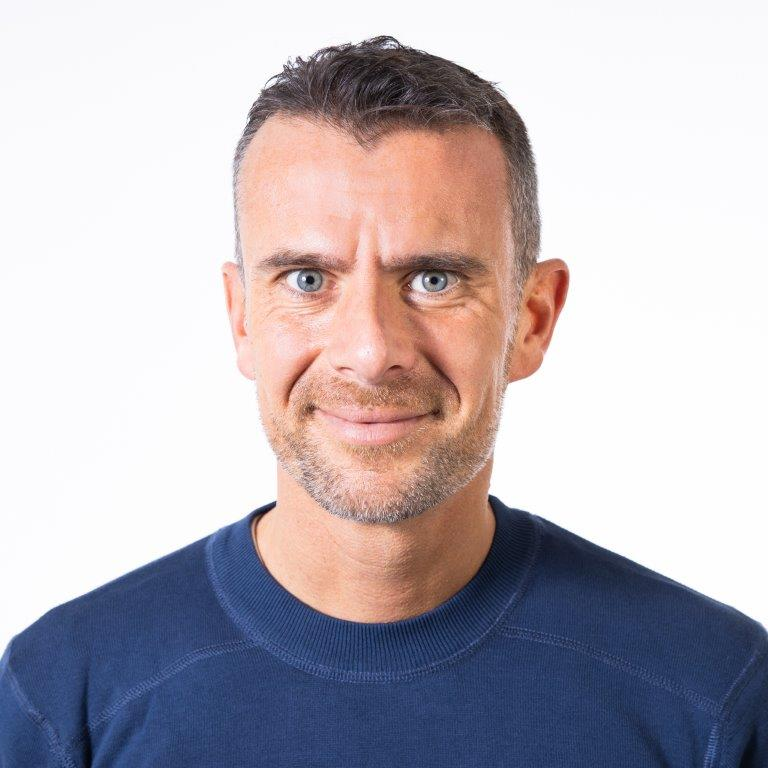
- Strolenberg in 2020

Member of the House of Representatives
- In office 7 September 2021 – 5 December 2023
- Preceded by: Tamara van Ark

Member of the municipal council of Hoogeveen
- In office 10 September 2009 – 23 September 2021
- Preceded by: Ewout Klok
- Succeeded by: Wilco Kramer

Personal details
- Born: Mark Frans Strolenberg; 5 April 1979 (age 47) Hoogeveen, Netherlands
- Party: People's Party for Freedom and Democracy
- Children: 2
- Occupation: Politician; IT professional; entrepreneur
- Website: markstrolenberg.vvd.nl

Mark Frans Strolenberg (born 5 April 1979) is a Dutch entrepreneur and former politician of the conservative-liberal People's Party for Freedom and Democracy (VVD). He founded an Internet company at the age of 18 and later worked as an IT professional for different companies.

Born and raised in Hoogeveen, he served on its municipal council next to his job between 2009 and 2021, and was a member of his local water authority in the years 2004–21 with a 2008–10 hiatus. He unsuccessfully ran for a member of the House of Representatives in the March 2021 general election, but was appointed to that body in September after the resignation of Tamara van Ark. He held his seat until 2023, when he did not run for re-election.

== Early life and career ==
Strolenberg was born and raised in Hoogeveen, and has a brother. His father was a primary school teacher and union leader, while his mother worked as a dental assistant.

After completing his junior secondary commercial education (leao), Strolenberg started vocational training at Alfa-college to become a bookkeeper. In 1997, he and fellow student Sander Drooglever founded the Hoogeveen Internet company DiM Media, when they were both 18 years old. The company registered domain names and designed and maintained websites for small and medium-sized enterprises and for the municipality of Hoogeveen. They dropped out of school in September 1999 to pursue their company, and Strolenberg became its commercial director, while Drooglever served as its technical director. Newspaper Dagblad van het Noorden described DiM Media as the largest service provider in the northern part of the Netherlands in 2001, when it had six full-time employees and several hundred customers. It was taken over by soft- and hardware supplier Rovecom in January 2003, when it still employed six people, and Strolenberg continued to work at the company. He later worked for several other companies while a municipal councilor. He was an online manager for utility company Engie until his appointment to the House in 2021.

Strolenberg has also served on the board of his local water authority next to his job. He was first elected to the 25-member board of the Reest en Wieden water authority in the 2004 election, when candidates were still unaffiliated with political parties. Strolenberg unsuccessfully ran for re-election in 2008 as a member of the VVD, but re-joined the board in 2010 during the new term. As a board member, he supported a merger with the Groot Salland water authority, saying it could lead to over €3 million in savings. Strolenberg was re-elected to the water board in 2015 as the VVD's lead candidate and kept his seat on the board after the merger of the Reest en Wieden and Groot Salland water authorities into Drents Overijsselse Delta in 2016. He was re-elected once more in 2019 as lead candidate. He gave up his position as leader of the VVD on the board upon his appointment to the House of Representatives in 2021.

== Local politics ==
He became a member of the municipal council of Hoogeveen on 10 September 2009, when VVD group leader Ewout Klok vacated his seat due to his moving out of the municipality. He was placed third on the VVD's Hoogeveen party list in the 2010 municipal election and was re-elected. He pled for the town to be connected to the Internet with fiber-optic cables, and he sent a letter to national VVD parliamentary leader Halbe Zijlstra opposing plans to close a prison and a mental institution in the area, citing a high unemployment rate. Strolenberg was named Hoogeveen councilor of the year in 2013, and he received a new term after his participation in the 2014 municipal election as the VVD's third candidate. In the council, he proposed to extend retailers' possibilities to open on Sundays beyond eight designated days per year. However, all of Strolenberg's alternatives failed to gain enough support except for one that still retained the eight days. He also wanted to experiment with free parking on Saturdays to draw more visitors to the town center.

Strolenberg became the VVD group leader in the council in July 2016, when his predecessor Arjan van der Haar stepped down for health reasons. He was his party's lead candidate in Hoogeveen in the March 2018 municipal election and won his bid for re-election. The VVD, meanwhile, had become the largest opposition party in the council. Strolenberg left his post of group leader at the start of May to spend more time with his family and on his other positions, and he said that he wanted to be more focused on employment and economic affairs in the council. Following a government report, he also addressed nuisances by inhabitants of a local asylum seekers' center with a ward for people requiring additional supervision, and he unsuccessfully called on the municipality to step out of the local waste collection cooperative Area in favor of a larger and cheaper one. Strolenberg left the Hoogeveen municipal on 23 September 2021 due to his appointment to the House of Representatives.

== House of Representatives ==
Strolenberg was the VVD's 38th candidate in the March 2021 general election. He campaigned in his home province with the slogan "Stem een liberale Drent in het parlement" (Vote a liberal from Drenthe into parliament), and he tried to promote the technology industry in his province by, for example, calling for tests with self-driving cars. He received 4,743 preference votes, three quarters of which were cast in Drenthe, but he was not elected due to the VVD winning 34 seats. Strolenberg was sworn into the House of Representatives on 7 September 2021 following the resignation of Tamara van Ark for health reasons. He became the VVD's spokesperson for fisheries, animal welfare, countryside, relations with and financing of lower governments, municipal mergers, government transparency, working conditions in the public sector, legal position of political office holders, and nobility. Four months later, his specialties of fisheries, animal welfare, and countryside were replaced by constitutional affairs (including privacy), elections, political finance, the Electoral Council, High Councils of State, and the Dutch Whistleblowers Authority before being changed again by social affairs. Strolenberg is on the Committees for the Interior; for Agriculture, Nature and Food Quality; and for Social Affairs and Employment. When the collapse of the fourth Rutte cabinet triggered a snap election in November 2023, Strolenberg announced he would not run for re-election, saying he believed he could not provide the most added value in the House. He also cited a bleak political climate in the body.

== Personal life ==
Strolenberg has two daughters. He divorced his wife, Miranda, whom he had met at the age of 17, in the late 2010s and came out around that same time. He lives in the town center of Hoogeveen, and during his time as a member of the House of Representatives he also had an apartment in The Hague's center.

== Decorations ==
Honours
Ribbon bar	Honour	Country	Date	Ref.
	Knight of the Order of Orange-Nassau	Netherlands	5 December 2023	

== Electoral history ==
Electoral history of Mark Strolenberg
Year	Body	Party	Pos.	Votes	Result		Ref.
Year	Body	Party	Pos.	Votes	Party seats	Individual	Ref.
2021	House of Representatives	People's Party for Freedom and Democracy	38	4,743	34	Lost (Note: Strolenberg was appointed to the body later during the term due to a vacancy.)	
