= N48 motorway (Netherlands) =

Road in Drenthe and Overijssel, Netherlands

Provincial highway 48
- Provinciale weg 48
- Location of the N48 motorway

Route information
- Length: 19 km (12 mi)

Major junctions
- North end: Hoogeveen
- A 28 / E232 / A 37 / E233 – Hoogeveen
- South end: Ommen

Location
- Country: Kingdom of the Netherlands
- Constituent country: Netherlands
- Provinces: Drenthe, Overijssel

Highway system
- Roads in the Netherlands; Motorways; E-roads; Provincial; City routes

The rijksweg N48 is a Dutch expressway, managed by Rijkswaterstaat between the A28 and A37 motorways near Hoogeveen and the N340 and N36 just north of Ommen, and is an important north–south route in the provinces of Overijssel and Drenthe. All junctions on the route are grade-separated crossings, except for the roundabout at its terminus in Ommen. The total length of the N48 is approximately 19 kilometers (12 miles).

== Junction and exit list ==
| Province | Municipality | km | mi | Destinations | Notes |
|---|---|---|---|---|---|
| Drenthe | Hoogeveen | 0 | 0.0 | A 28 / E232 / A 37 / E233 – Hoogeveen | Continues as road A28/E232 to Groningen |
| Drenthe | De Wolden | 4.5 | 2.8 | Zuidwolde | |
| Overijssel | Hardenberg | 13 | 8.1 | N 377 – Balkbrug, Dedemsvaart | |
| Overijssel | Ommen | 19 | 12 | N 36 / N 340 – Ommen, Arriërveld | Continues as road N340 to Zwolle |
1.000 mi = 1.609 km; 1.000 km = 0.621 mi
