= A28 motorway (Netherlands) =

Road connecting Utrecht and Groningen

A28 motorway
- Rijksweg 28
- Location of the A28 motorway

Major junctions
- North end: N7 in Groningen
- South end: Waterlinieweg in Utrecht

Location
- Country: Kingdom of the Netherlands
- Constituent country: Netherlands
- Provinces: Utrecht, Gelderland, Overijssel, Drenthe, Groningen

Highway system
- Roads in the Netherlands; Motorways; E-roads; Provincial; City routes

The A28 motorway is a motorway in the Netherlands. It is approximately 188 kilometers in length.

The A28 traverses the Dutch provinces of Utrecht, Gelderland, Overijssel, Drenthe and Groningen. The road connects the cities of Utrecht, Amersfoort, Zwolle, Assen, and Groningen.

== Overview ==
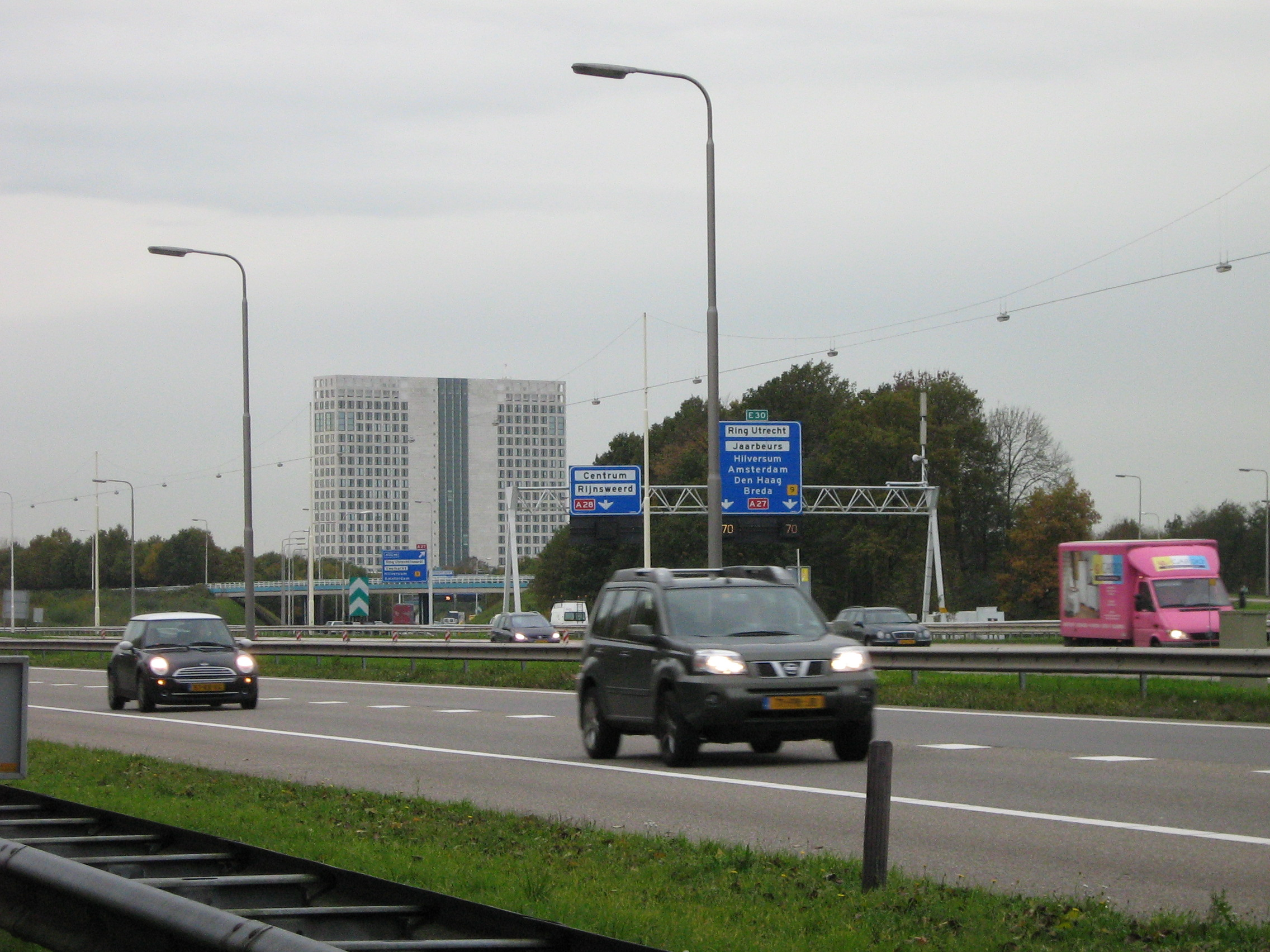
The A28 near interchange Rijnsweerd.

The A28 motorway's southern terminus is in the city of Utrecht, at an intersection with the Waterlinieweg, an important arterial road through the eastern part of the city. Major motorway junctions can be found at the interchanges Rijnsweerd near Utrecht (A27), Hoevelaken near Amersfoort (A1), Hattemerbroek near Zwolle (motorway A50 / highway N50), Lankhorst near Meppel (A32) and Hoogeveen near Hoogeveen (A37). The northern terminus is at the traffic light controlled intersection of Julianaplein near Groningen (motorway A7 / highway N7).

The A28, however, is not the most direct connection between Utrecht and Groningen. The route via Lelystad and Heerenveen, following the A27, A6 and the A7, is some 10 kilometers shorter. Groningen is not signed at the southern terminus of the motorway to avoid confusion. Groningen first appears on the signs near exit Soesterberg.

The A28 motorway generally has 2x2 lanes, except for a short section just east of Utrecht where shoulder running is allowed during rushhour, and the section between the junctions Hattemerbroek (A50/N50) and Lankhorst (A32). In the city of Zwolle, narrow additional lanes are added in the median that can be opened depending on traffic flow, whereas three permanent lanes are available between exit 21 and junction Lankhorst.

== European route ==
Between the interchange Hoevelaken near Amersfoort and the terminus at Julianaplein in Groningen, the A28 is also a European route: the E232. This section of the A28 is the complete E232 route; the E232 does not consist of any other road or section.

== Exit list ==
Province	Municipality	km	mi	Exit	Name	Destinations	Notes
Utrecht	Utrecht	0	0.0	—	Centrum / Interchange Rijnsweerd	Waterlinieweg	
Utrecht	Utrecht	1	0.62	—	Interchange Rijnsweerd	E30 / A 27	West end of E 30 overlap
Utrecht	Utrecht	2	1.2	2	De Bilt	N 412 north / Universiteitsweg	
Utrecht	Zeist	9	5.6	3	Den Dolder	N 238 north / Krakelingweg / Boulevard	
Utrecht	Soest	11	6.8	4	Soesterberg	N 413 north	
Utrecht	Utrechtse Heuvelrug	16	9.9	5	Maarn	N 221 northwest / N 227 south / Leusderweg	
Utrecht	Leusden	17	11	6	Leusden-Zuid	N 226 south / Arnhemseweg	
Utrecht	Leusden	19	12	7	Leusden	Randweg	
Utrecht	Amersfoort	22	14	8	Amersfoort	Hogeweg / Energieweg	
Utrecht	Amersfoort	27	17	—	Interchange Hoevelaken	E30 / E232 / A 1	East end of E 30 overlap; south end of E 232 overlap
Gelderland	Nijkerk	30	19	8a	Amersfoort-Vathorst / Nijkerk-Zuid	Verbindingsweg	
Gelderland	Nijkerk	36	22	9	Nijkerk	N 301 (Berencamperweg)	
Gelderland	Putten	41	25	10	Strand Nulde	Hoornsdam / Strandboulevard	
Gelderland	Ermelo, Netherlands	46	29	11	Hardewijk-Zuid	Buitenbrinkweg / Spijkweg / Palmbosweg	
Gelderland	Harderwijk	51	32	12	Ermelo, Netherlands	N 303 south / Oranjelaan	
Gelderland	Harderwijk	53	33	13	Lelystad	N 302 (Ceintuurbaan)	
Gelderland	Nunspeet	63	39	14	Elspeet	N 310 (Elspeterweg)	
Gelderland	Nunspeet	66	41	15	Epe	N 795 southeast / Eperweg	
Gelderland	Elburg	72	45	16	't Harde	N 309 (Eperweg)	
Gelderland	Oldebroek	82	51	17	Wezep	N 308 west / Zuiderzeestraatweg	
Gelderland	Oldebroek	86	53	—	Interchange Hattemerbroek	A 50 south / N 50 northwest	
Overijssel	Zwolle	92	57	18	Zwolle-Zuid	N 331 northwest / N 337 southeast	
Overijssel	Zwolle	94	58	19	Zwolle-Centrum	Katerdijk / Burgemeester Roelenweg	
Overijssel	Zwolle	96	60	20	Zwolle-Noord	N 35 south / Zwartewaterallee	
Overijssel	Ommen	99	62	21	Ommen	N 340 east / Ordelseweg / Nieuwleusenerdijk	
Overijssel	Dalfsen	105	65	22	Nieuwleusen	N 377 (Hasselterweg / Nieuwe Dedemsvaartweg) / Harmelenweg / Lichtmisweg / Oude Rijksweg	
Overijssel	Staphorst	112	70	23	Staphorst	Achthoevenweg / Oude Rijksweg	
Overijssel	Staphorst	114	71	—	Interchange Lankhorst	A 32 north	
Drenthe	De Wolden	121	75	24	De Wijk	N 851 west / Hessenweg	
Drenthe	De Wolden	128	80	25	Zuidwolde	Willem Moesweg	Eastbound exit and westbound entrance only
Drenthe	De Wolden	132	82	25	Zuidwolde	Echtenseweg	Westbound exit and eastbound entrance only
Drenthe	Hoogeveen	134– 140	83– 87	—	Interchange Hoogeveen	E233 east / A 37 east / N 48 south	Gap in km
Drenthe	Hoogeveen	142	88	26	Hoogeveen	Zuidwoldigerweg / Schutstraat	
Drenthe	Hoogeveen	144	89	27	Fluitenberg	N 374 east / Fluitenbergseweg	
Drenthe	Hoogeveen	148	92	28	Pesse	N 375 southwest / Dorpsstraat	
Drenthe	Westerveld	152	94	29	Dwingeloo	N 855 northwest (spieregerweg) / Wijsterseweg	
Drenthe	Midden-Drenthe	157	98	30	Beilen	Kanaalweg / Domoweg / Ossebroeken / Beilervaart	
Drenthe	Midden-Drenthe	160	99	31	Westerbork	N 381	
Drenthe	Assen	171	106	32	Assen-Zuid	N 33 east / Haarweg	
Drenthe	Assen	174	108	33	Assen	N 371 west (Balkenweg) / Balkenweg / Balkendwarsweg / Transportweg	
Drenthe	Assen	179	111	34	Assen-Noord	Asserstraat / Engelandlaan / Peelo Oost / Peelo	
Drenthe	Tynaarlo	186	116	35	Vries	N 386 (Zuidlaarderweg / Vriezerweg) / Dorpsstraat	
Drenthe	Tynaarlo	189	117	36	Zuidlaren	N 34 southeast	Southbound exit and northbound entrance
Drenthe	Tynaarlo	190	120	37	Eelde / Groningen Airport	Groningerstraat / Punterweg	
Groningen	Haren	196	122	38	Haren	N 861 southwest (Meerweg) / Emmalaan / Vondellaan	
Groningen	Groningen	199	124	39	Groningen-Zuid	Van Ketwich Verschuurlaan	
Groningen	Groningen	200	120	—	Interchange Julianaplein	E22 / E232 south / A 7 / N 7 / Emmaviaduct / Hoornsediep	North end of E 232 overlap
1.000 mi = 1.609 km; 1.000 km = 0.621 mi: Concurrency terminus; Incomplete access
