= Klazienaveen =

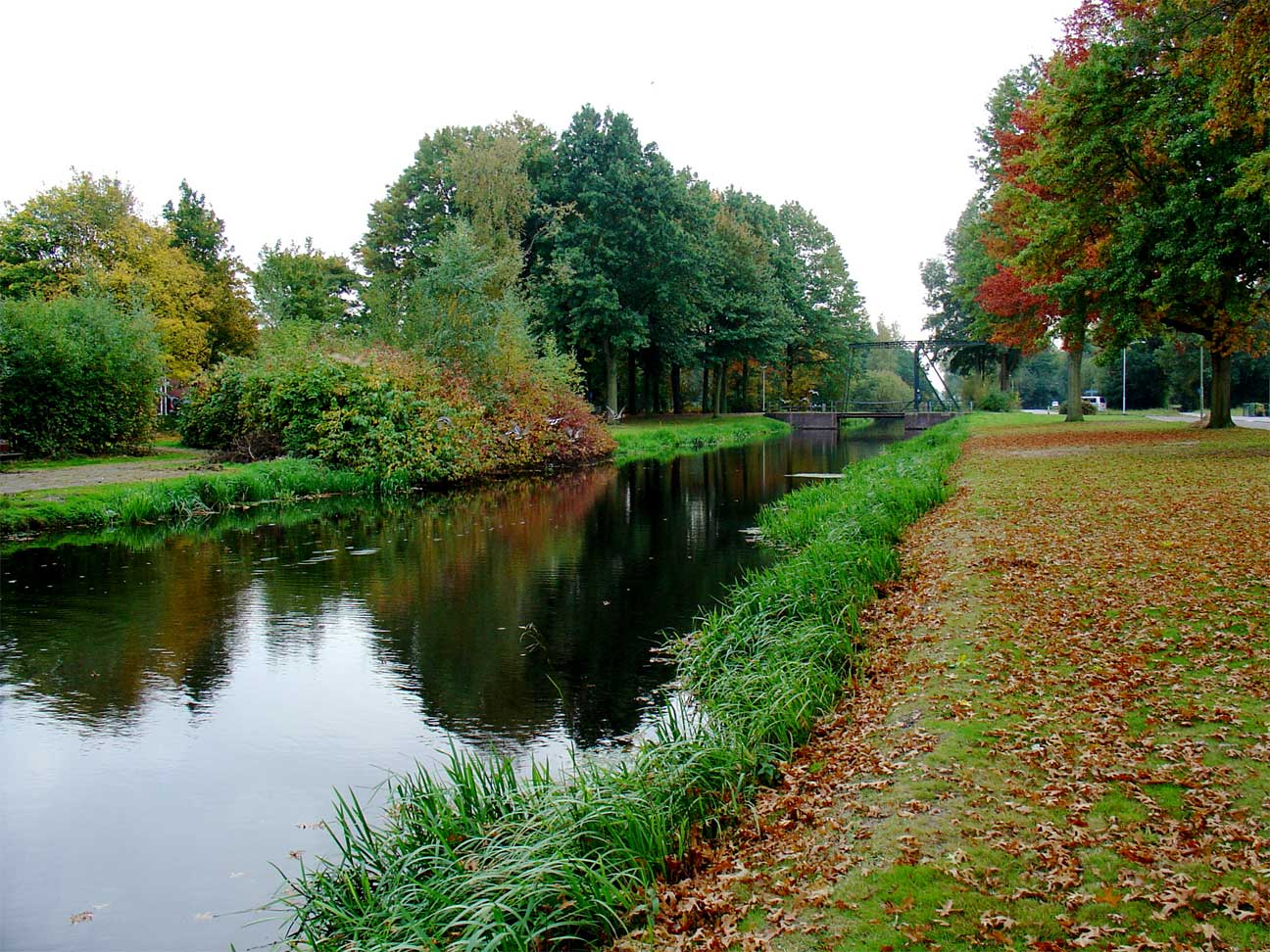
- Klazienaveen (Molenwijk)

- Location in province of Drenthe in the Netherlands Klazienaveen (Netherlands)
- Coordinates: 52°44′N 6°59′E
- Country: Netherlands
- Province: Drenthe
- Municipality: Emmen
- Established: 1899

Area
  - Total: 30.05 km^{2} (11.60 sq mi)
- Elevation: 21 m (69 ft)

Population (2021)
  - Total: 11,980
  - Density: 398.7/km^{2} (1,033/sq mi)
- Demonym: Klazienaveener
- Postal code: 7891
- Dialing code: 0591
- Major roads: A37

Klazienaveen is a town to the southeast of Emmen in the Dutch province of Drenthe. It is located approx 5 km (3.1 mi) from the German border. Klazienaveen started as a peat colony owned by Willem Albert Scholten. It has been named after Klaassien Sluis, the wife of Scholten.

== History ==
In 1874, Willem Albert Scholten bought the 974 hectares (2,410 acres) Smeulveen to exploit the peat. In 1890, Scholten offered the skipper Jan Adde Hazewinkel a flag as the first person to transport the peat. In 1899, a village appeared along the canal. In 1903, Scholten's son Jan Evert renamed Smeulveen and the village Klazienaveen after his mother Klaassien Sluis. It is one of the two villages in the Netherlands named after a non-royal woman. In 1932, it was home to 2,327 people.

In 1921, the Purit factory opened and produces Norit (activated carbon). On 23 March 1945, the factory was bombed by the Royal Air Force causing eight deaths among the factory workers. The clock in the engine room stopped and has remained as a reminder. Since 2012, it is owned by Cabot Corporation. After World War II, Klazienaveen started expanding rapidly. In the 1960s, greenhouse cultivation started in Klazienaveen. The town can be reached via the A37 motorway.

== Notable people ==
- Tess de Vries (born 2001), volleyball player
- Ruben Roosken (born 2000), footballer
- Sip Bloemenberg (born 1952), footballer, (FC Groningen, FC Twente, VV Klazienaveen)
- Evert ten Napel (born 1944), sports commentator (NOS,ESPN,Talpa)
- Hanja Maij-Weggen (born 1943), politician and former Queen's Commissioner of North Brabant

== Gallery ==
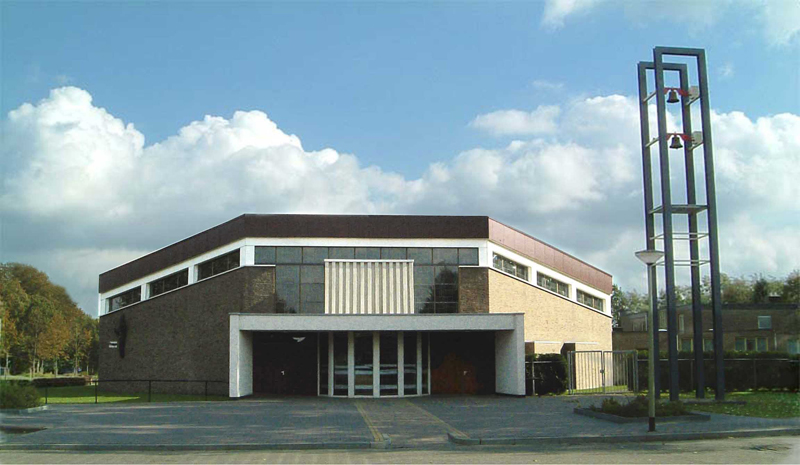
Church in Klazienaveen

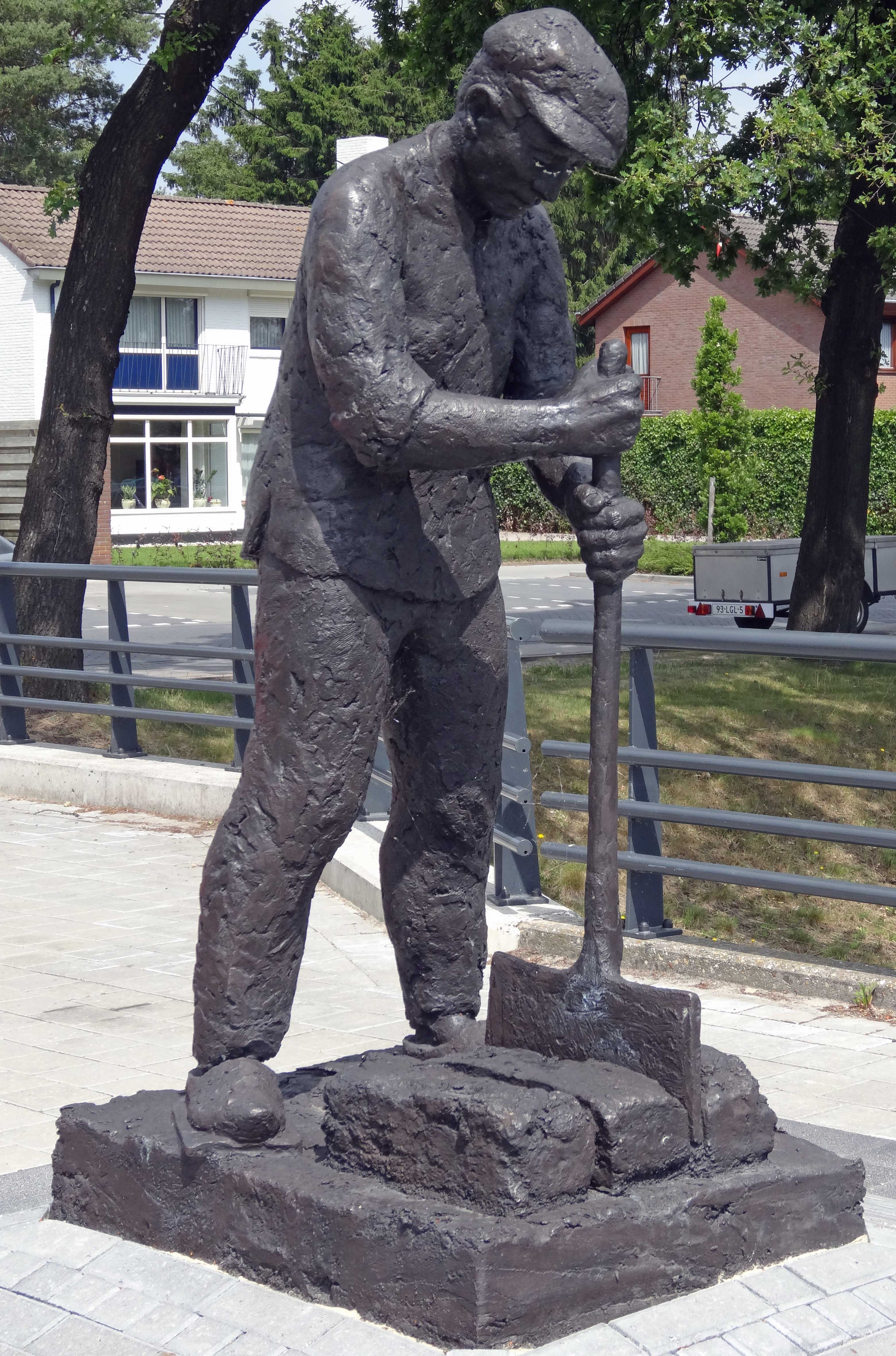
Peat worker by Bert Kiewit

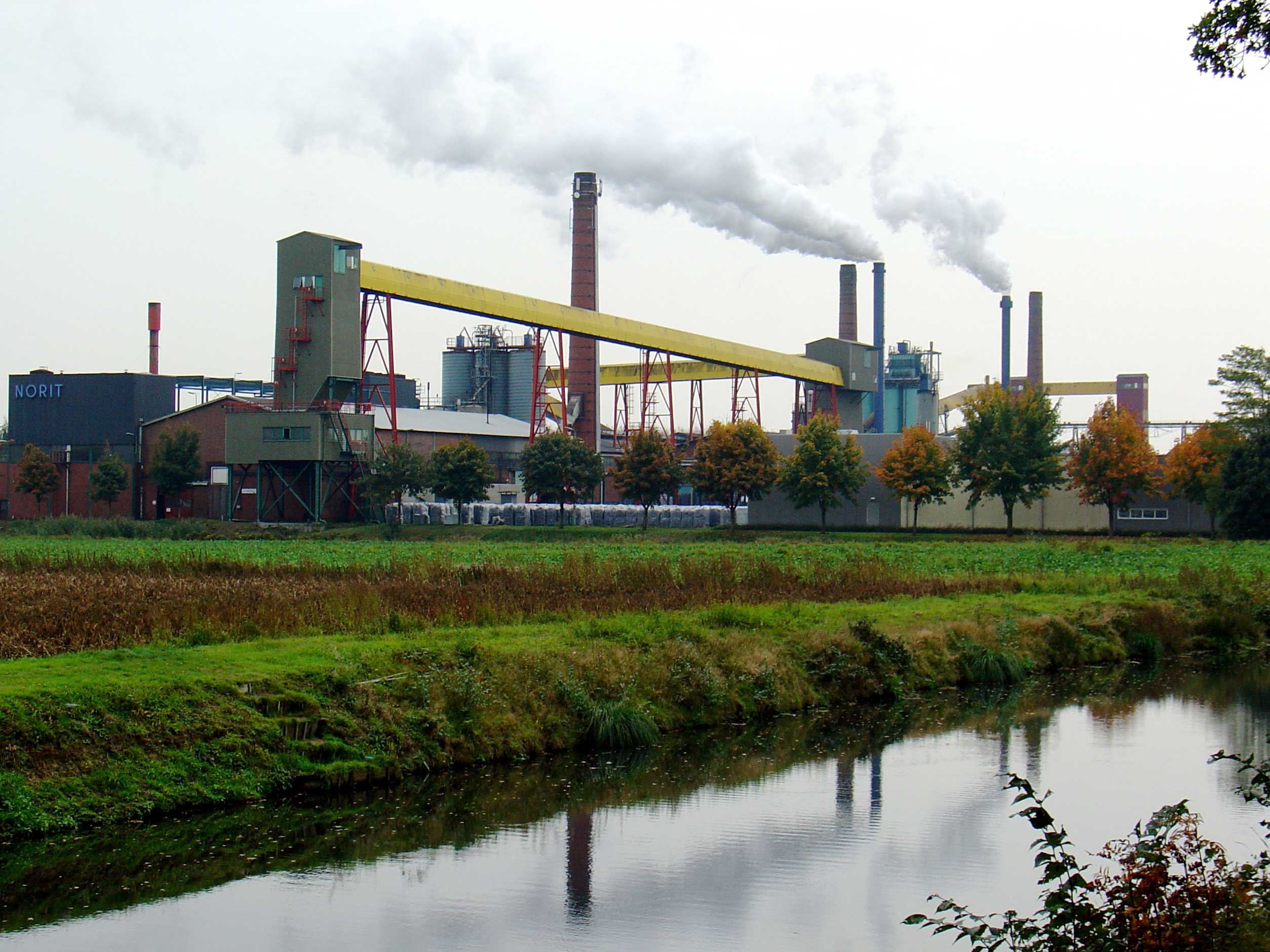
Norit factory

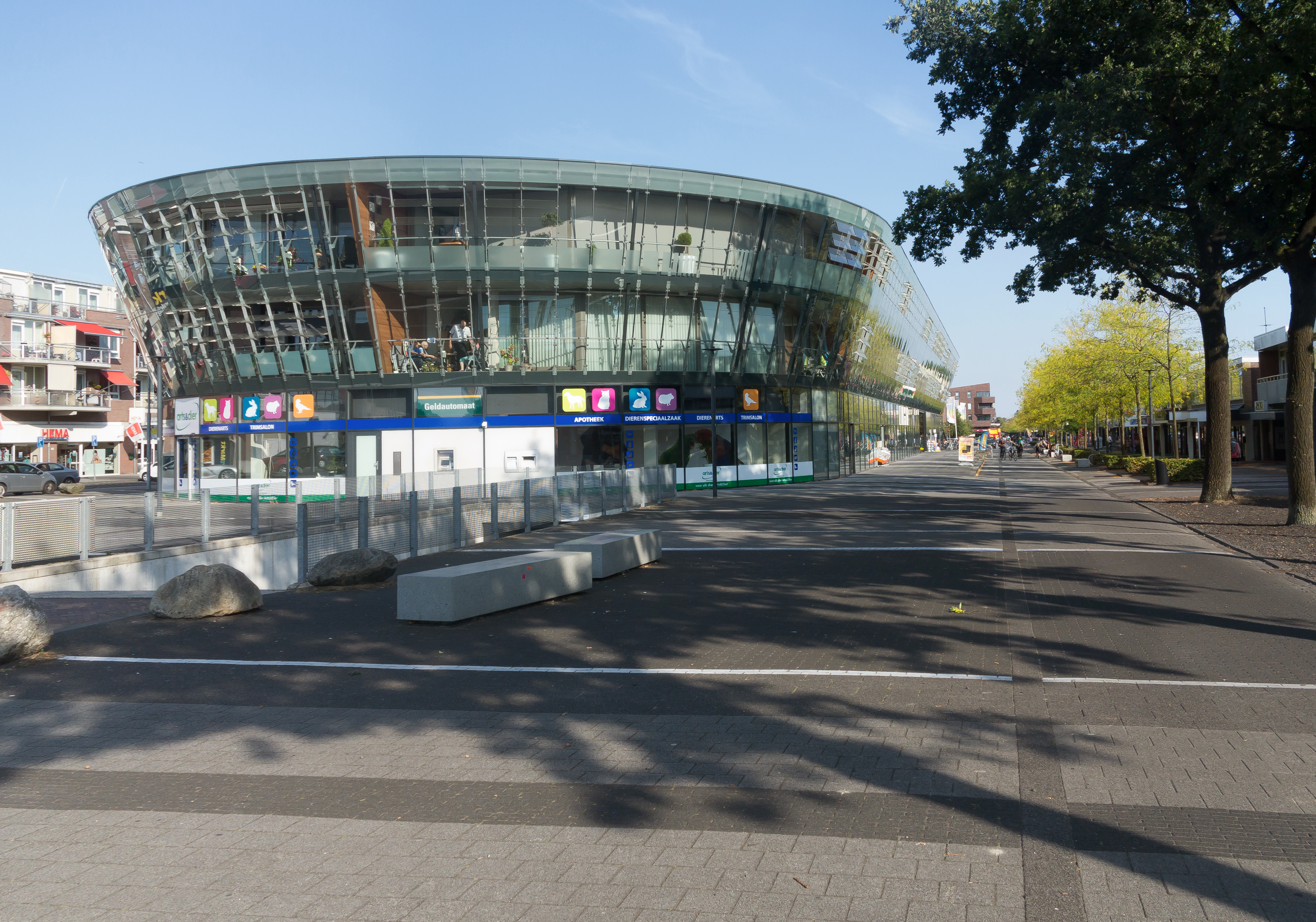
Shopping mall
