= Nieuwlande =

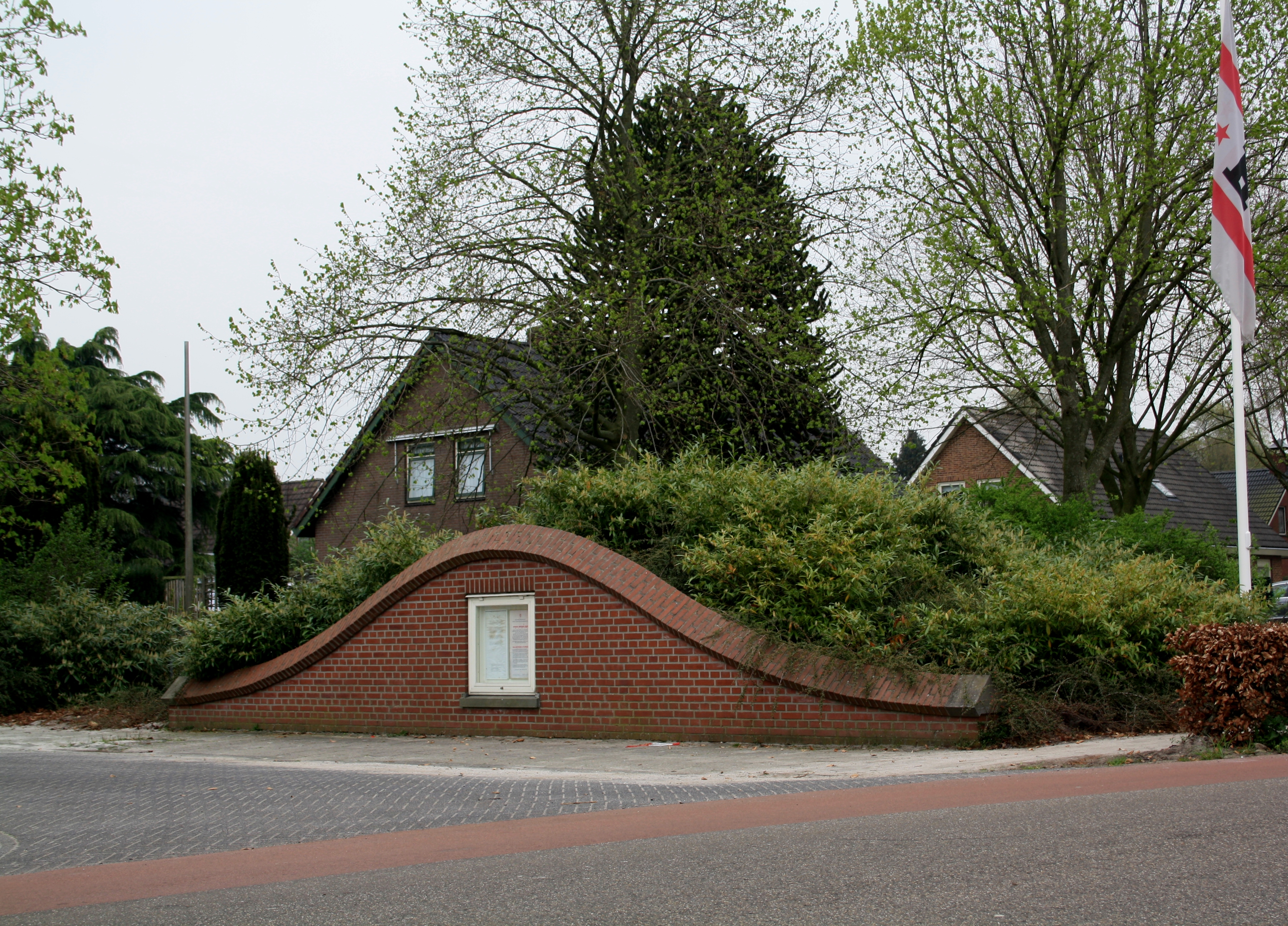
- Street in Nieuwlande

- Location within Drenthe Location within Netherlands
- Coordinates: 52°41′45″N 6°36′43″E
- Country: Netherlands
- Province: Drenthe
- Municipality: Coevorden, Hoogeveen, some houses in Hardenberg

Population (1 January 2023)
  - Total: 1,419
- Major roads: A37

Nieuwlande (Dutch Low Saxon: Neilaande) is a Dutch village located in the north-eastern province of Drenthe situated in the municipality of Hoogeveen. The population, as of 2023 is 1419. Nieuwlande is one of only two villages in the world that collectively received the Righteous Among the Nations award for its Holocaust Rescue story where nearly all of the town's residents hid and saved the lives of hundreds of Jews as well as resistance fighters and German deserters during World War II.

Nieuwlande is on peatland in the south of Drenthe. It arose where five municipalities meet: Oosterhesselen (by far the largest part), Dalen, Coevorden, Hardenberg, and Hoogeveen. For this reason, a book about Nieuwlande's history had the catching title "Nieuwlande, village with five burgomasters". This situation obstructed to a great extent the extension possibilities and an efficient governing board: for many municipalities it was but an unimportant peripheral area. Therefore, at the municipal division of Drenthe on 1 January 1998 it was decided for the village to be in one municipality, by moving over to the municipality border of Hoogeveen about 1.5 kilometres to the east. The small part of the municipality of Hardenberg (province Overijssel) was, however, not affected by this; and also beyond the new municipality border some inhabitants of Nieuwlande still lived in the new fusion municipality Coevorden. The border now, however, no longer goes straight through the village.

Nieuwlande has a new Dutch Reformed church, a Reformed church from 1913, and a church of the meeting of the believers. It also has sports fields; a public and Protestant primary school; a hypermarket with a mail agency; children's playgrounds under its jurisdiction, other companies, and public places. Rural areas are characterised by agriculture (peat diggings) and some nature reserves - scrub and heathland or peat.

== History ==
The legal beginning of Nieuwlande was on 30 March 1816. On this date, the shareholders of Zwinderen market sold a parcel of 337.5 acres of fenland to Rudolph Otto van Echten and to Warner de Jonge and Hugo Christiaan Carsten in Hoogeveen.

== Nieuwlande in World War II ==
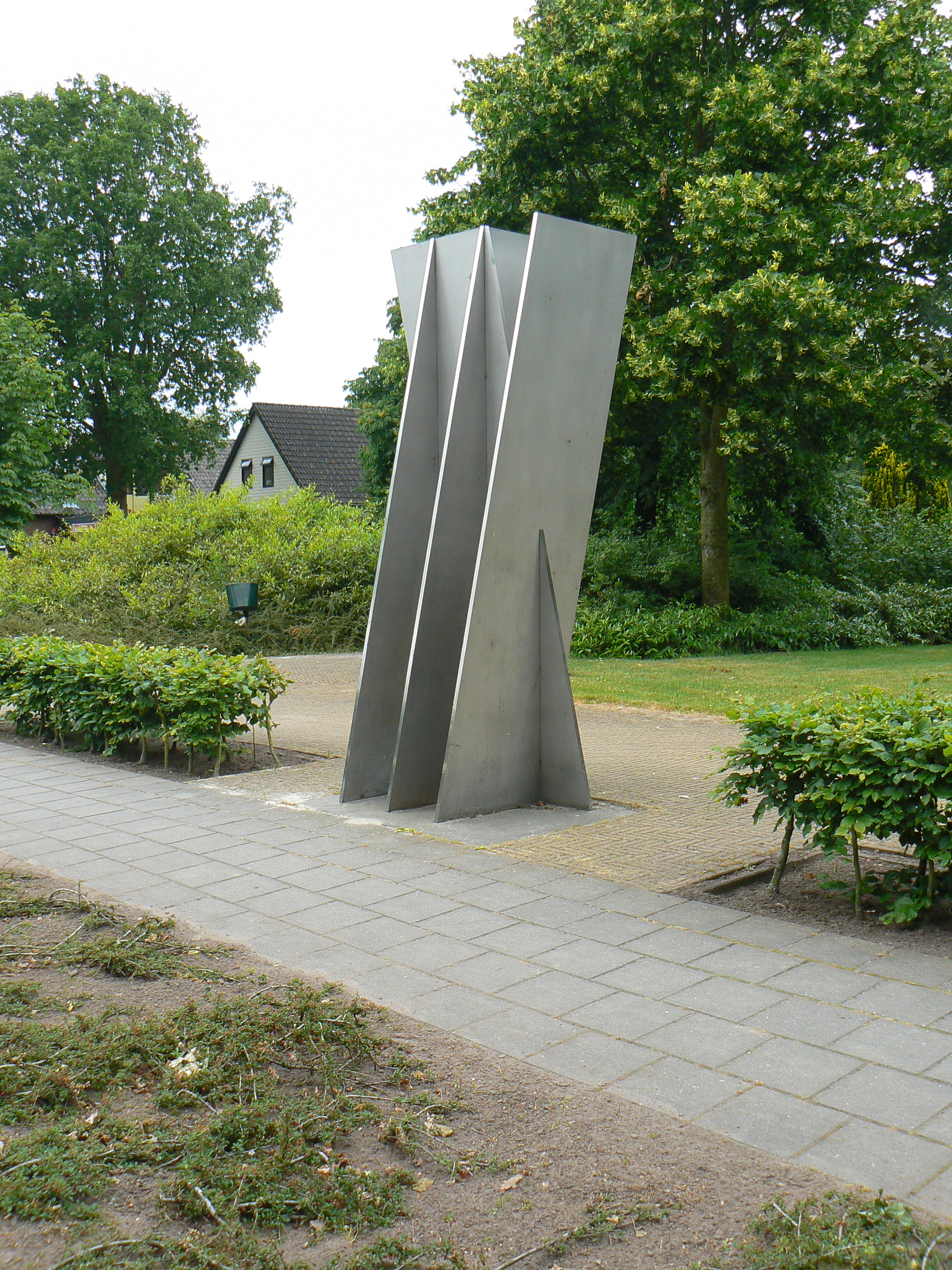
Sculpture/memorial Verzetsmonument (1985) by Paul Hulskamp in Nieuwlande

Nieuwlande is famous for its collective sheltering of Jews in 1942 and 1943, during the Holocaust.

The villagers resolved that every household would hide one Jewish family or at least one Jew.

Arnold Douwes, the son of the local pastor, had never had very much to do with Jews or Judaism, but when antisemitic measures were introduced, he threw himself body and soul into the effort to help Jews on the run by convincing the local inhabitants to give shelter to fugitive families. In addition, the villagers provided the fugitives with food, new identification papers, and financial support. Two teens, hidden under the floorboards of a Nieuwlande church building, published a handwritten newspaper for the Jews in hiding. Two copies remain.

In 1988 a monument to honor the village of Nieuwlande was built in Yad Vashem, Jerusalem. In 1990 the village was one of two communities collectively honored as the Righteous Among the Nations by Yad Vashem in Israel for saving Jews in Nazi-occupied Europe. The other awardee was the French community of Le Chambon-sur-Lignon.

Nieuwlande had nearly no recognition for its heroism and had no entry in the Holocaust Encyclopedia of the United States Holocaust Memorial Museum. The first museum indicating Nieuwlande's rescue opened in 2018.
