= Hoogeveen =

Hoogeveen 't O(ge)veine (Dutch Low Saxon)
- Municipality and town
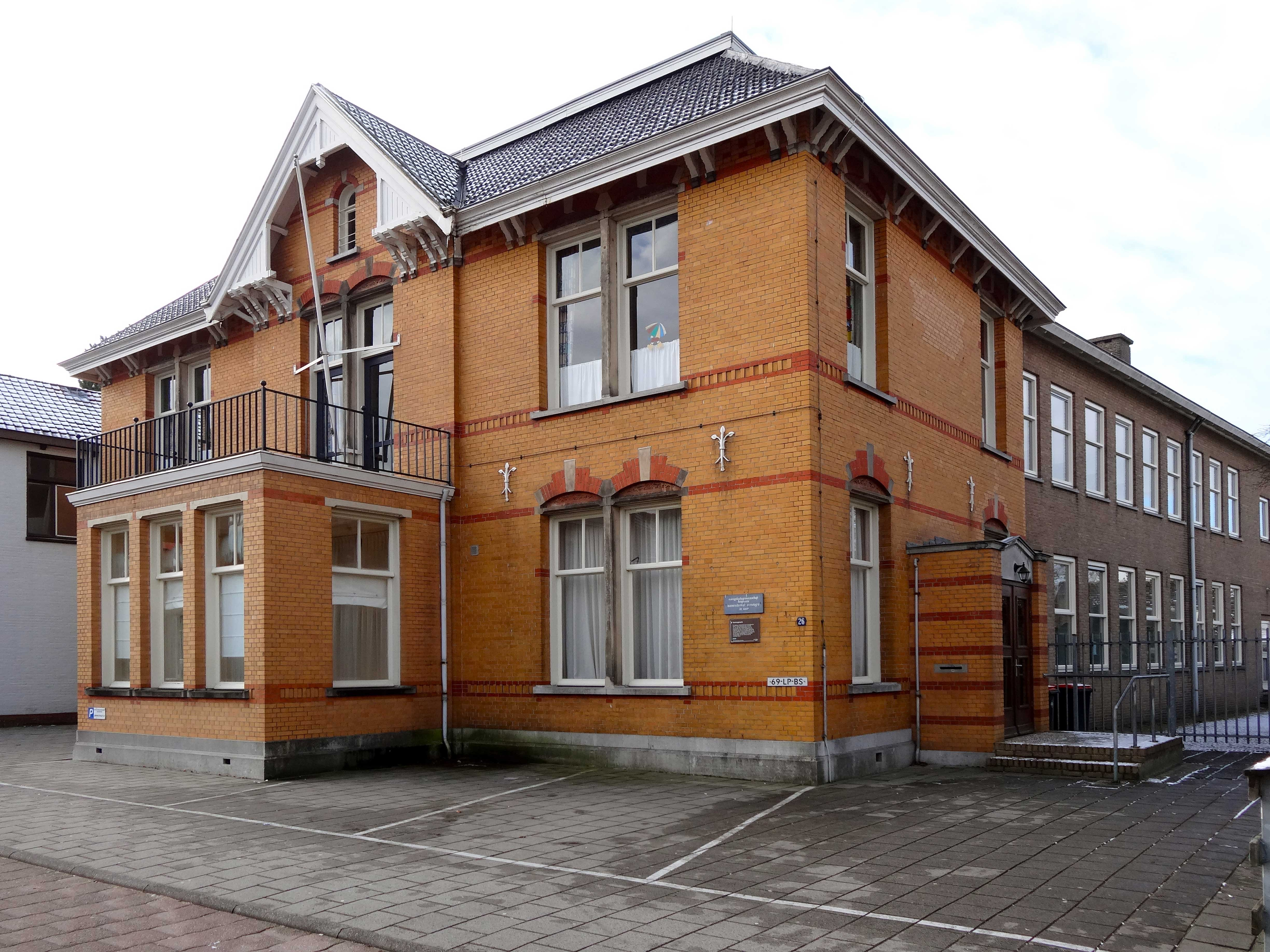
- Former court house in Hoogeveen

- Flag Coat of arms

- Location in Drenthe
- Coordinates: 52°44′N 6°29′E
- Country: Netherlands
- Province: Drenthe

Government
  - Body: Municipal council
  - Mayor: Martijn Breukelman (CDA)

Area
  - Total: 129.25 km^{2} (49.90 sq mi)
  - Land: 127.54 km^{2} (49.24 sq mi)
  - Water: 1.71 km^{2} (0.66 sq mi)
- Elevation: 12 m (39 ft)

Population (January 2021)
  - Total: 55,603
  - Density: 436/km^{2} (1,130/sq mi)
- Demonym: Hoogevener
- Time zone: UTC+1 (CET)
  - Summer (DST): UTC+2 (CEST)
- Postcode: Town: 7901-7909 Municipality: 7901-7909, 7911-7916, 7918, 7931, 7933-7934, 7936
- Area code: 0524, 0528
- Website: www.hoogeveen.nl

Hoogeveen (Dutch: [ˌɦoːɣəˈveːn]; Dutch Low Saxon: 't Ogeveine or 't Oveine) is a municipality and town in the Dutch province of Drenthe. It is located in the south of the province and shares a provincial border with Overijssel. The municipality has a population of 56,897 (2025), of which 40,560 reside in the town of Hoogeveen itself. The second largest population center in the municipality is Hollandscheveld.

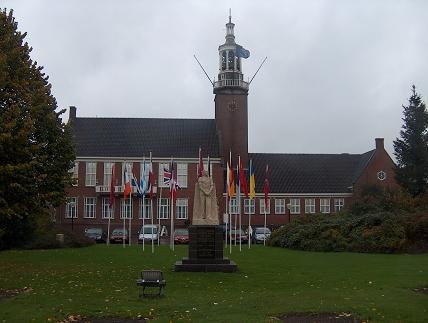
Hoogeveen town hall

Hoogeveen was developed in the 17th century as a peat colony. Today it is a central town with many urban amenities. There is a wide range of shops and substantial employment in industry. Religiously, the town is highly fragmented.

== History ==
=== Peat colony ===
The history of the raised bog area (Dutch: hoogveen) of what would later become the municipality of Hoogeveen has been documented since 1551. In that year, Reinold van Burmania and his wife purchased the so-called Meppense Venen, the southeastern half of the future municipality.

Hoogeveen dates its history to 20 December 1625, when Roelof van Echten bought a large tract of peat land from farmers of the district with the plan to harvest its peat. One old map of the area called it Locus Deserta Atque ob Multos Paludes Invia, a deserted and impenetrable place of many swamps. Hoogeveen was founded in 1636 by Pieter Joostens Warmont and Johan van der Meer, investors from Leiden in the Hollandsche Compagnie (Hollandic Company) who, after fierce conflicts with Baron Roelof van Echten tot Echten, had decided that their workers should be able to settle permanently on the peat bogs.

The excavated peat was transported by water to Meppel and beyond via a canal (the 'Nieuwe Grift', later called the 'Hoogeveense Vaart'). Smaller canals, called wijken, were dug perpendicular to this canal at intervals of 160 meters. This distance was still easily covered by a laborer with a wheelbarrow full of peat. This created a grid of intersecting canals. New canals, the "opgaanden," also connected systems of neighborhoods further on in the peat bogs to the Hoogeveense Vaart canal. Shopkeepers, peat cutters, land agents, and craftsmen soon settled at the main intersection, called the Kruis. Hoogeveen remained a peat colony for centuries.

=== 19th century ===
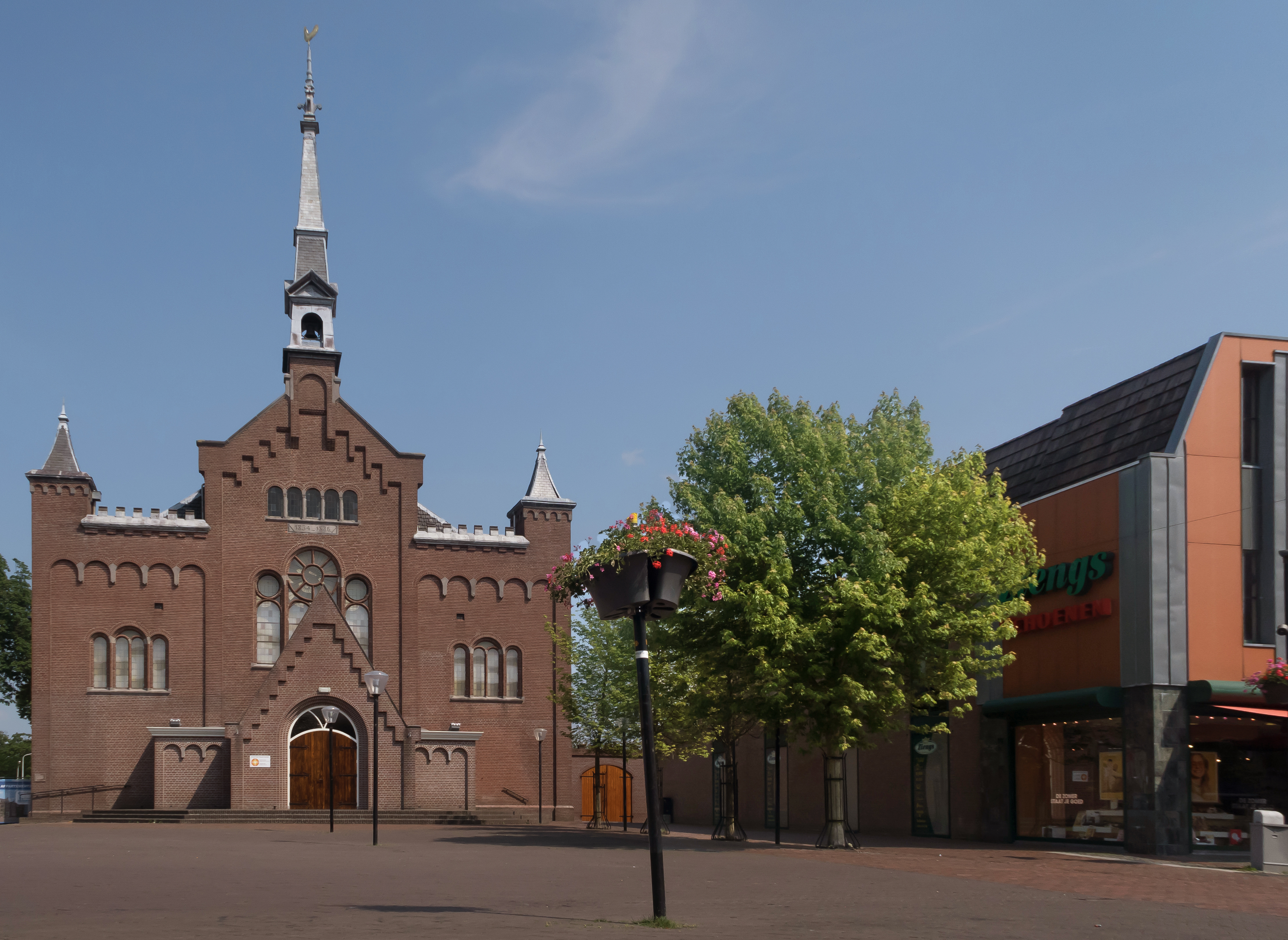
Hoofdstraatkerk church

In 1811, the municipality had 4,794 inhabitants, in 1840 there were 7,339, and in 1874, 10,763. Only at the end of the 19th century did peat become less important and people switched to agriculture, livestock farming, and industry. This was particularly noticeable after the opening of the Meppel-Groningen railway line on 1 May 1870. Well-known factories in that period produced products like dairy, cheese and frozen food.

The coat of arms of Hoogeveen, granted 10 November 1819, is white, with a pile of peat covered in straw in the center and beehives on each side, representing the town's first two major industries.

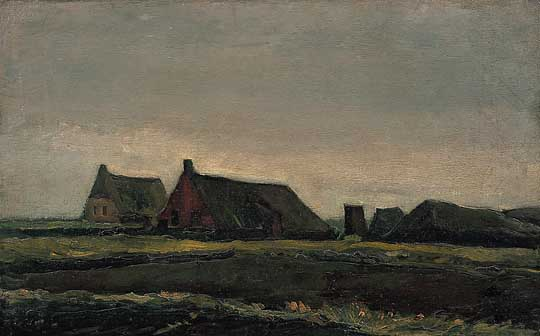
Huts in Zwartschaap, on the way between Hoogeveen and Pesse, painted by Van Gogh in 1883

Vincent van Gogh visited the area in the fall of 1883.

=== World War II ===
Soon after the German occupation in 1940, Hoogeveen became a center of resistance. Encouraged by Reverend Frits Slomp, persecuted people began finding their way to Hoogeveen and the surrounding area. The illegal newspapers Trouw and Vrij Nederland were also distributed from Hoogeveen. The notorious resistance group Nico (Jan Naber) and Victor (Albert Rozeman) came from Hoogeveen.

On 29 July 1943, the NSB (National Socialist Movement (Netherlands)) mayor of Oud Schoonebeek was assassinated by members of the resistance group De Krim. This incident had far-reaching consequences for the Hoogeveen resistance. The day after the assassination, a raid was conducted in Hoogeveen by the Grüne Polizei. Between 25 and 30 detainees were transferred to the holiday camp "Noorderhuis," located north of Hoogeveen. Three of them were executed there. On 17 February 1944, the post office in Hoogeveen was robbed. With the cooperation of the counter clerk Henk Raak, who was later executed, 13,000 ration cards were stolen.

=== Recent history ===
The first important transportation connection was provided by the railway line, with Hoogeveen railway station opening in 1870. Since the early 1970s, access to the town has been provided by the A28 (Utrecht - Groningen) highway, and in the early 2000s, the A37 (Hoogeveen - Germany) highway was expanded from a provincial road to improve the region's connection to Emmen and further to Germany.

In the second half of the 1960s, Hoogeveen was the fastest growing town in the Netherlands. Until that period, the town contained a number of canals, which had been dug in the area's early days when it was a prime source of peat and maritime transportation was a necessity for efficient transportation of cargo. By the 1960s the rise of the automobile and truck-based transportation meant the canals had lost much of their economic function, and the canals were filled in.

Philips and Fokker, among others, established themselves in the town. To meet the enormous population growth, large new housing estates were built. However, in the 1980s the growth stopped. Instead of the previously expected 100,000 inhabitants around 1990, the number of inhabitants stabilized at around 45,000.

Since 1997 the Hoogeveen Chess Tournament has been organized here.

== Geography ==
=== Population centres ===
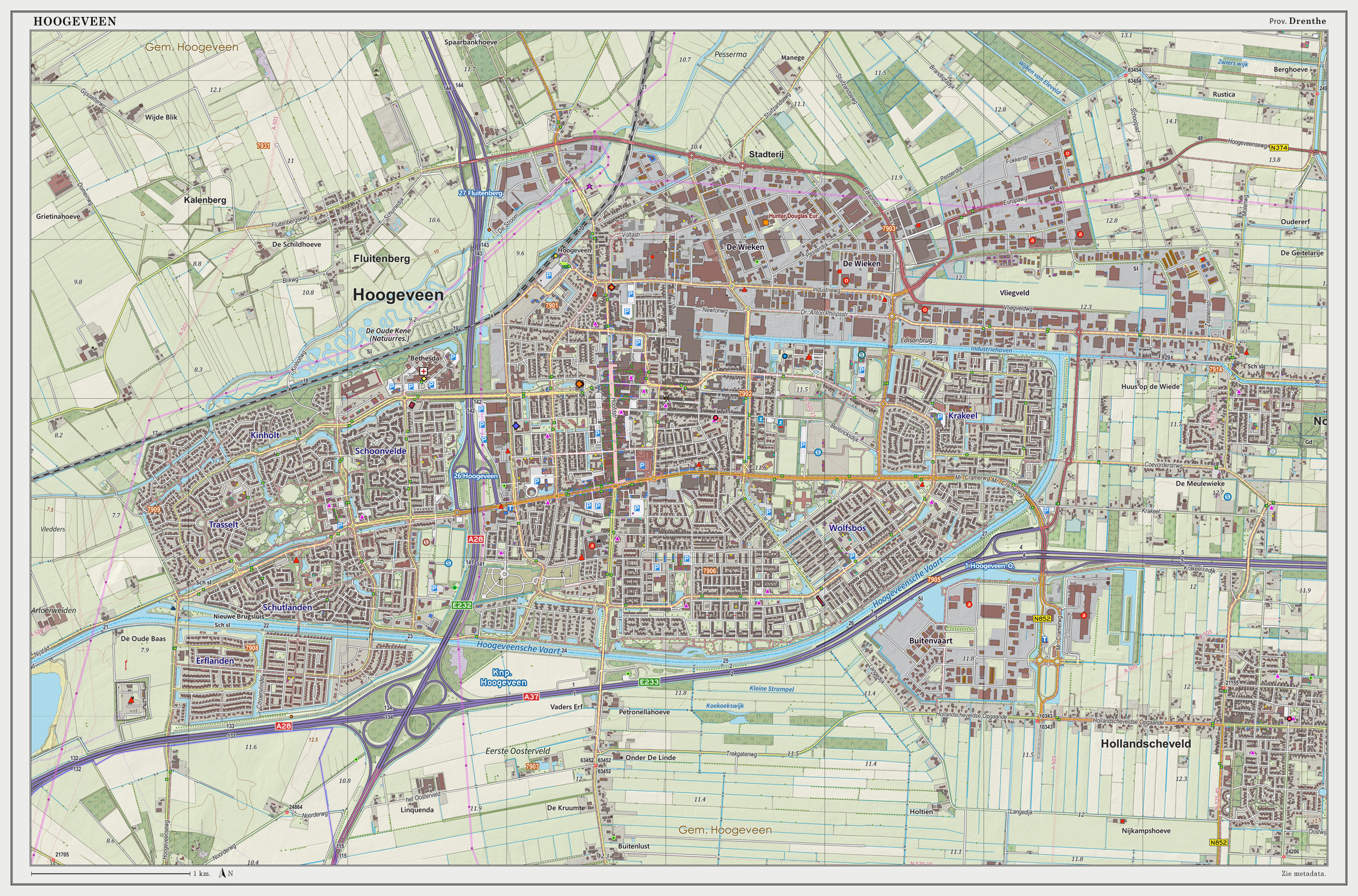
Map of Hoogeveen (town), March 2014

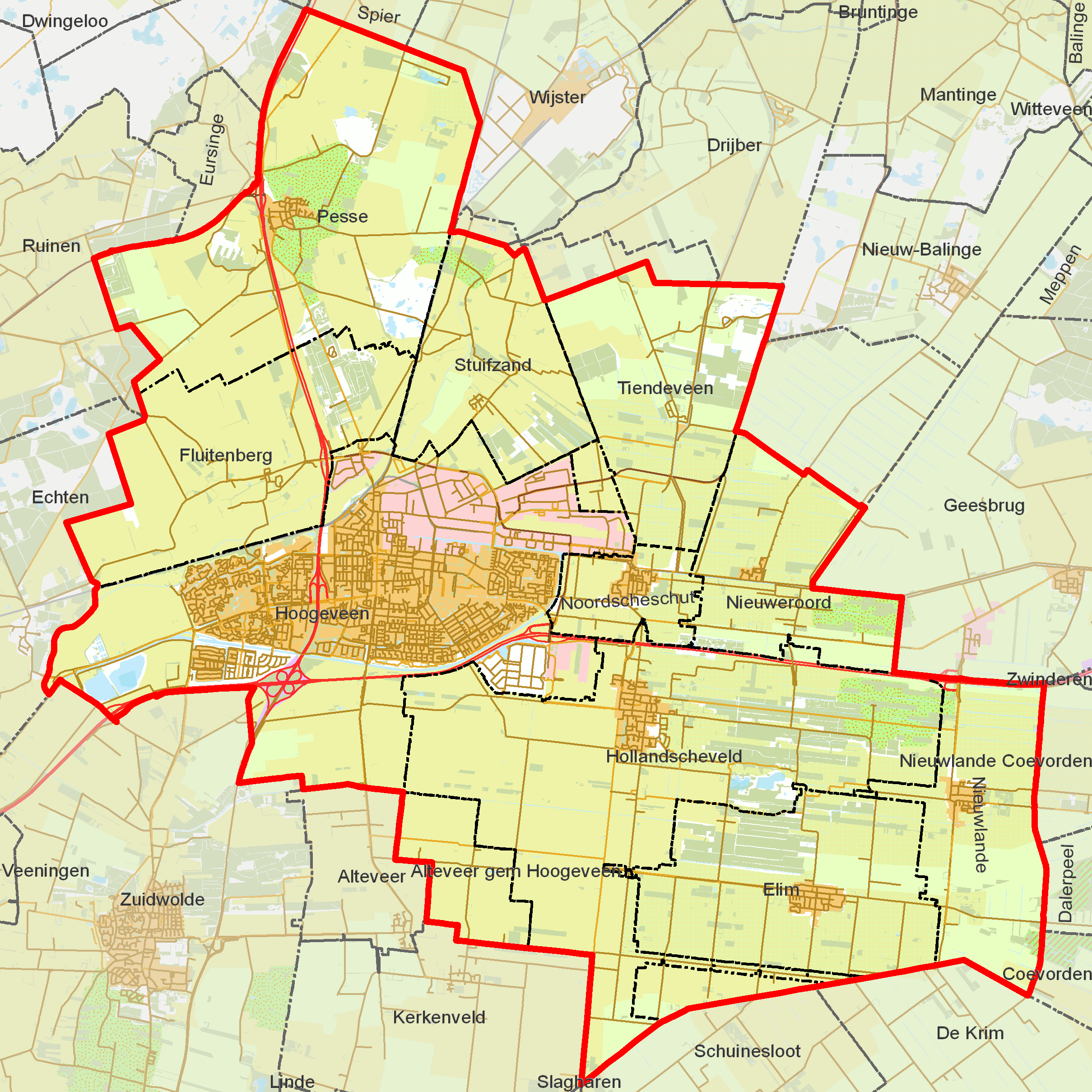
Map of Hoogeveen municipality

Elim, Fluitenberg, Hoogeveen and Noordscheschut, which still have the canals which used to be throughout the town. Other villages of the town are Hollandscheveld, Nieuw Moscou, Nieuweroord, Nieuwlande, Pesse, Stuifzand and Tiendeveen.

== Infrastructure and transportation ==
Hoogeveen is located at the eponymous Hoogeveen interchange of the A28 (west and north) and A37 (east) motorways, and the N48 (south) provincial road. Hoogeveen has a strategic position with a direct connection to the south with Overijssel (Ommen, Dedemsvaart, Zwolle) and northeast (Assen, Groningen, Emmen, Leeuwarden) that makes Hoogeveen a hub for regional amenities.

Hoogeveen is located on the Meppel-Groningen railway line. Hoogeveen station opened on this line in 1870. The current station building dates from 1984, designed by architect Cees Douma.

Steam tram connections were established in the 1900s. These connections were operated by the Eerste Drentsche Stoomtramweg-Maatschappij (EDS) and Dedemsvaartsche Stoomtramweg-Maatschappij (DSM) companies. EDS itself was based in Hoogeveen and operated lines from to Nieuw-Amsterdam, from Coevorden to Assen, and a branch to Emmen and Ter Apel. DSM opened and operated a line to Slagharen. Shortly after the Second World War, steam tram services were discontinued, and passenger transport was taken over by buses.

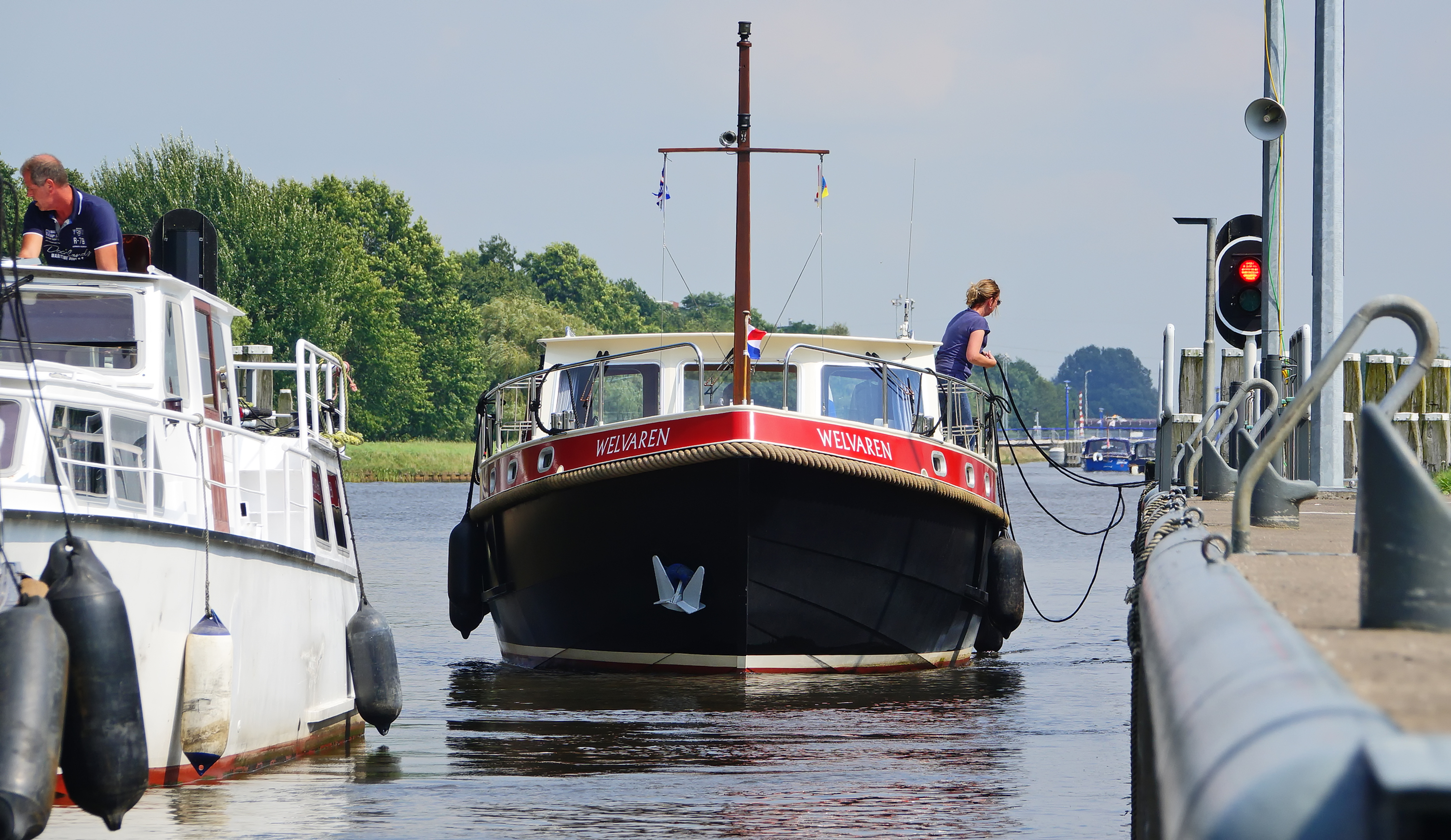
Nieuwebrugsluis in Hoogeveen

Hoogeveen also has a small airport that attracts some tourism. The airfield has one grass runway: runway 09-27, approximately 1200 m long. This makes it the longest grass runway in the Netherlands.

== International relations ==
=== Twin towns — Sister cities ===
Hoogeveen is twinned with:

- Martin, Slovakia

== Notable people ==
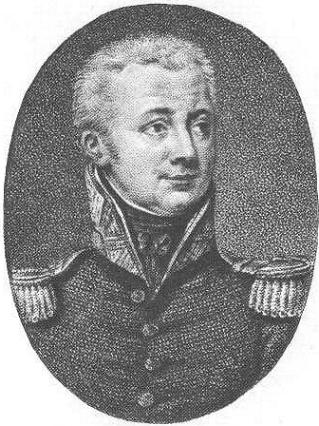
Leopold van Limburg Stirum

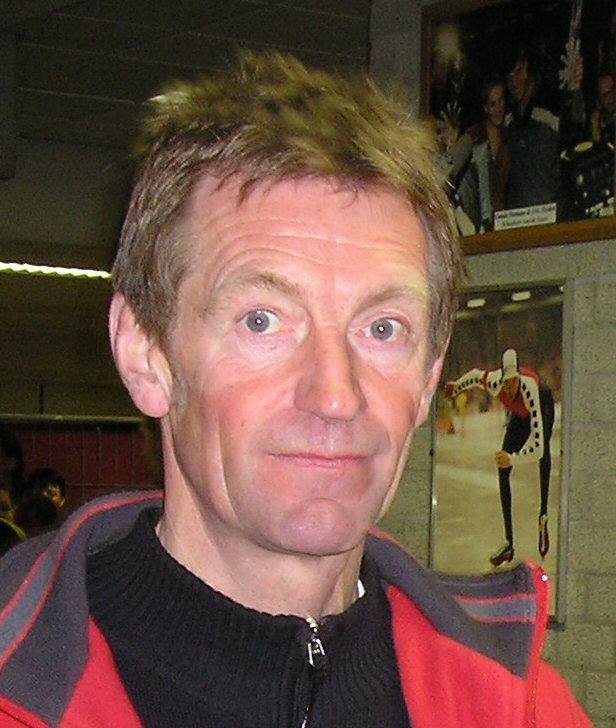
Piet Kleine, 2006

=== Academics ===
- Geert Booij (born 1947 in Hoogeveen) linguist and academic, created construction morphology
- Derk Pereboom (born 1957 in Pesse) Professor in Philosophy and Ethics

=== Religion ===
- Herman Bavinck (1854 in Hoogeveen – 1921) Dutch Reformed theologian and churchman

=== Politics ===
- Leopold Karel, Count of Limburg Stirum (1758 in Hoogeveen – 1840) politician, helped take power in 1813 to re-establish the monarchy
- Hendrik Koekoek (1912 in Hollandscheveld – 1987), farmer, politician, and founder of the defunct Farmers' Party
- Joop Bakker (1921 in Hoogeveen – 2003) politician
- Jetta Klijnsma (born 1957 in Hoogeveen) politician
- Anne Mulder (born 1969 in Hoogeveen) politician
- Mark Strolenberg (born 1979) politician
- Lea Bouwmeester (born 1979 in Hoogeveen) politician

=== Sport ===
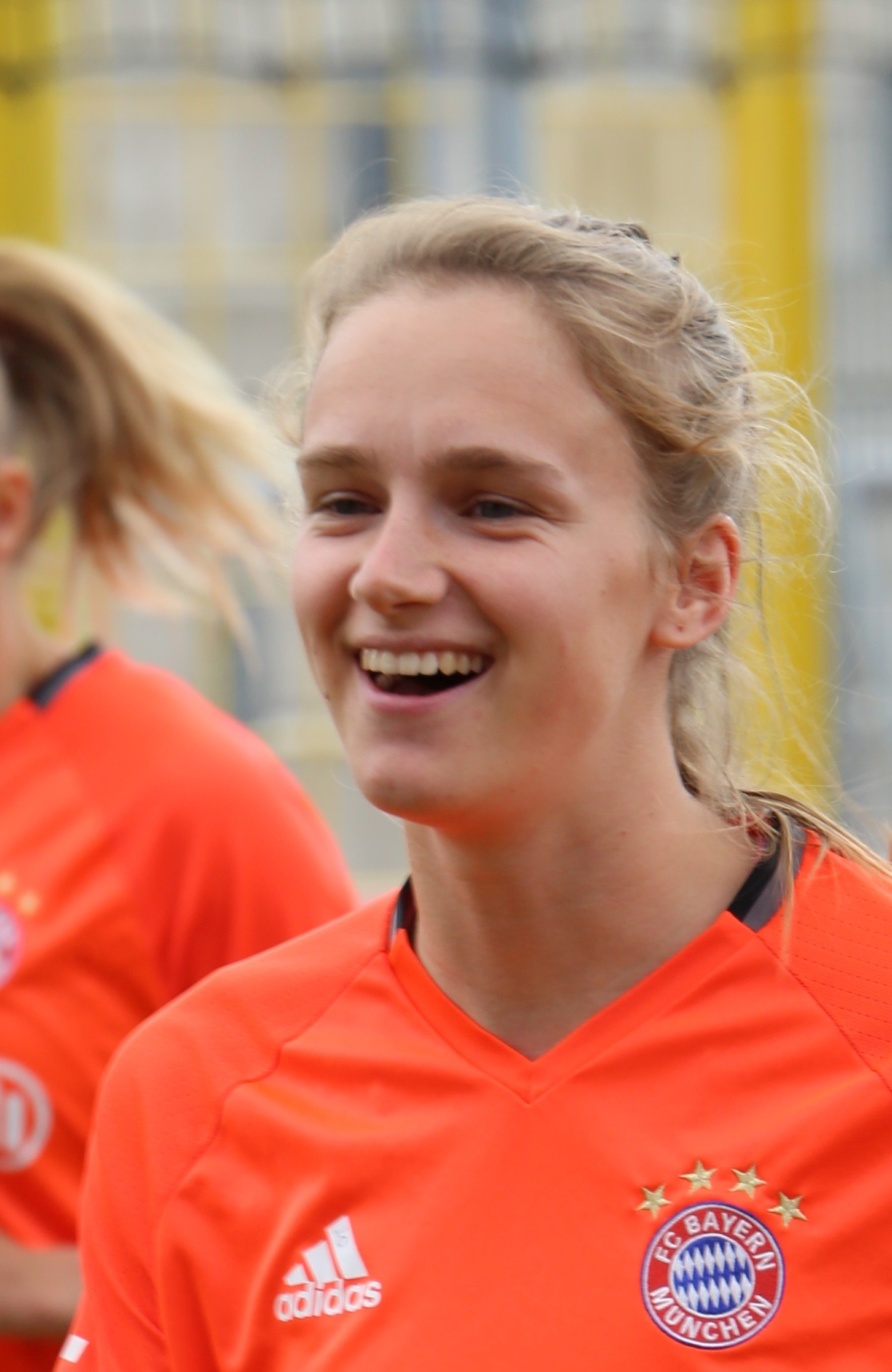
Vivianne Miedema, 2017

- Jan Bols (born 1944 in Hoogeveen) former Dutch long track speed skater, participated in the 1968 and 1972 Summer Olympics
- Piet Kleine (born 1951 in Hollandscheveld) former speed skater, gold medallist at the 1976 Winter Olympics and silver medallist at the 1980 Winter Olympics
- Theo ten Caat (born 1964 in Hollandscheveld) former professional footballer with 412 club caps
- Tonnie Heijnen (born 1967 in Hoogeveen), Dutch para table tennis player, winner at the 2004 Summer Paralympics
- Erik Dekker (born 1970) retired Dutch professional road racing cyclist, medallist at the 1992 Summer Olympics
- Sandra Wiegers (born 1974 in Hoogeveen), former volleyball player
- Ingmar Berga (born 1984 in Hoogeveen), marathon speed skater and inline speed skater.
- Erik Bakker (born 1990 in Hoogeveen) professional footballer with 340 club caps
- Jens Jurn Streutker (born 1993 in Hoogeveen) footballer
- Vivianne Miedema (born 1996 in Hoogeveen) professional footballer and the Netherlands all-time top scorer, across both the women's and men's teams. She is also the all-time top scorer in the English FA Women's Super League.
- Jens Dekker (born 1998 in Hoogeveen) professional road racing cyclist

=== Culture ===
- Anne van Amstel (born 1974 in Hoogeveen) writer, psychologist and poet
- Jill de Jong (born 1982 in Hoogeveen) model and actress

=== Varia ===
- Hendrikje van Andel-Schipper (1890 – 2005 in Hoogeveen) the oldest person ever from the Netherlands

== Climate ==
Climate data for Hoogeveen (1991−2020 normals, extremes 1989−present)
Month	Jan	Feb	Mar	Apr	May	Jun	Jul	Aug	Sep	Oct	Nov	Dec	Year
Record high °C (°F)	14.2 (57.6)	18.2 (64.8)	23.4 (74.1)	28.7 (83.7)	31.2 (88.2)	34.9 (94.8)	39.0 (102.2)	35.7 (96.3)	31.3 (88.3)	25.9 (78.6)	19.4 (66.9)	14.8 (58.6)	39.0 (102.2)
Mean daily maximum °C (°F)	5.2 (41.4)	6.1 (43.0)	9.7 (49.5)	14.5 (58.1)	18.1 (64.6)	20.7 (69.3)	22.9 (73.2)	22.6 (72.7)	19.1 (66.4)	14.2 (57.6)	9.0 (48.2)	5.8 (42.4)	14.0 (57.2)
Daily mean °C (°F)	2.8 (37.0)	3.1 (37.6)	5.7 (42.3)	9.2 (48.6)	12.9 (55.2)	15.6 (60.1)	17.7 (63.9)	17.3 (63.1)	14.1 (57.4)	10.2 (50.4)	6.3 (43.3)	3.5 (38.3)	9.9 (49.8)
Mean daily minimum °C (°F)	0.3 (32.5)	0.2 (32.4)	1.8 (35.2)	3.9 (39.0)	7.5 (45.5)	10.1 (50.2)	12.2 (54.0)	11.9 (53.4)	9.4 (48.9)	6.4 (43.5)	3.4 (38.1)	1.0 (33.8)	5.7 (42.3)
Record low °C (°F)	−18.2 (−0.8)	−16.5 (2.3)	−19.7 (−3.5)	−6.7 (19.9)	−2.7 (27.1)	0.9 (33.6)	3.5 (38.3)	4.1 (39.4)	0.9 (33.6)	−7.1 (19.2)	−9.6 (14.7)	−14.1 (6.6)	−19.7 (−3.5)
Average precipitation mm (inches)	73.3 (2.89)	62.9 (2.48)	60.2 (2.37)	44.1 (1.74)	62.6 (2.46)	68.9 (2.71)	89.6 (3.53)	79.7 (3.14)	71.4 (2.81)	73.4 (2.89)	66.8 (2.63)	81.3 (3.20)	834.2 (32.84)
Average precipitation days (≥ 1.0 mm)	12.9	11.2	10.3	8.4	9.6	10.1	11.5	11.5	10.0	11.5	12.3	13.6	132.9
Average relative humidity (%)	89.9	86.9	82.6	76.5	75.4	78.1	79.4	81.4	85.6	88.4	91.7	91.6	84.0
Mean monthly sunshine hours	62.8	88.8	141.6	190.1	217.8	205.1	215.1	195.3	153.1	118.3	66.8	58.3	1,713.1
Percentage possible sunshine	24.6	31.7	38.2	45.4	44.6	40.8	42.5	42.7	40.1	35.8	25.3	24.4	36.3
Source: Royal Netherlands Meteorological Institute
