= Oosterhesselen =

- Village
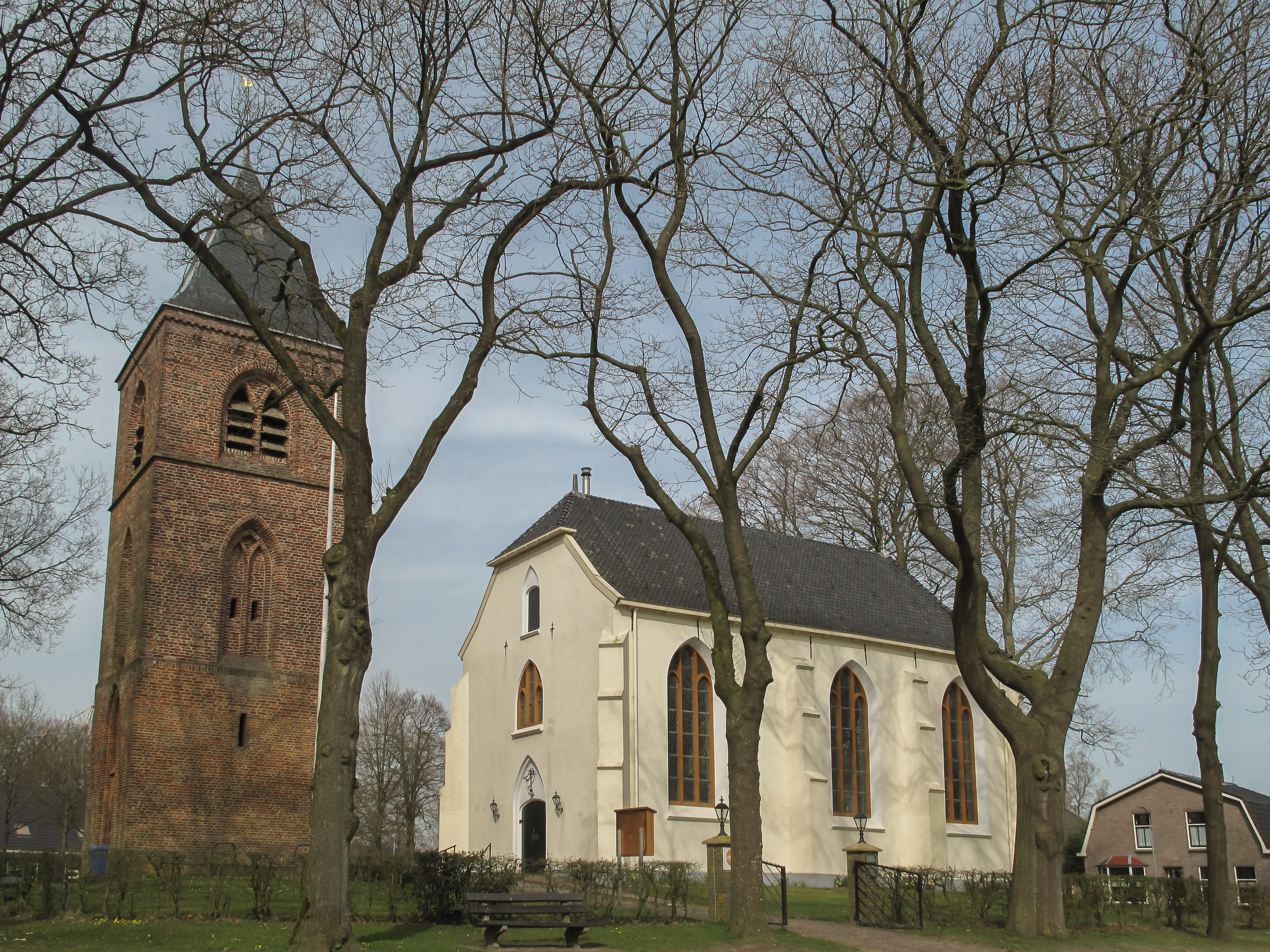
- Church of Oosterhesselen

- Location within Drenthe Location within Netherlands
- Coordinates: 52°45′26″N 6°43′10″E
- Country: Netherlands
- Province: Drenthe
- Municipality: Coevorden

Area
  - Total: 64.78 km^{2} (25.01 sq mi)
- Elevation: 17 m (56 ft)

Population (2023)
  - Total: 1,865
  - Density: 28.79/km^{2} (74.57/sq mi)
- Time zone: UTC+1 (CET)
  - Summer (DST): UTC+2 (CEST)
- Postal code: 7861
- Dialing code: 0524
- Major roads: A37

Oosterhesselen is a village in the Dutch province of Drenthe. It is located in the municipality of Coevorden, about 9 km north of the city. Oosterhesselen was a separate municipality between 1819 and 1998, when it was merged with Coevorden.

== History ==
Oosterhesselen is an esdorp which developed in the early Middle Ages. It has a large village green with the church in the middle. It was first mentioned in 1207 as Oesterhelsel, and refers to the common hazel tree. Oost (East) has been added to distinguish it from Westerhesselen. Westerhesselen was renamed Darp in the 19th century.

The church tower dates from the 15th century. The matching church was destroyed during the 1592 Siege of Coevorden, and in 1628 a new church was constructed detached from the tower.

The havezate De Klencke dates from the Middle Ages. A havezate was a requirement to be admitted to the Knights of Drenthe. It was first mentioned in 1482, and was extensively modified in 1670. It is surrounded by a moat. The 450 hectares (1,100 acres) forest around the estate has become a nature area.

In 1819, Oosterhesselen became an independent municipality. 1840, Oosterhesselen was home to 889 people. The town hall dates from 1912, and forms a single building with the mayor's residence.

== Gallery ==
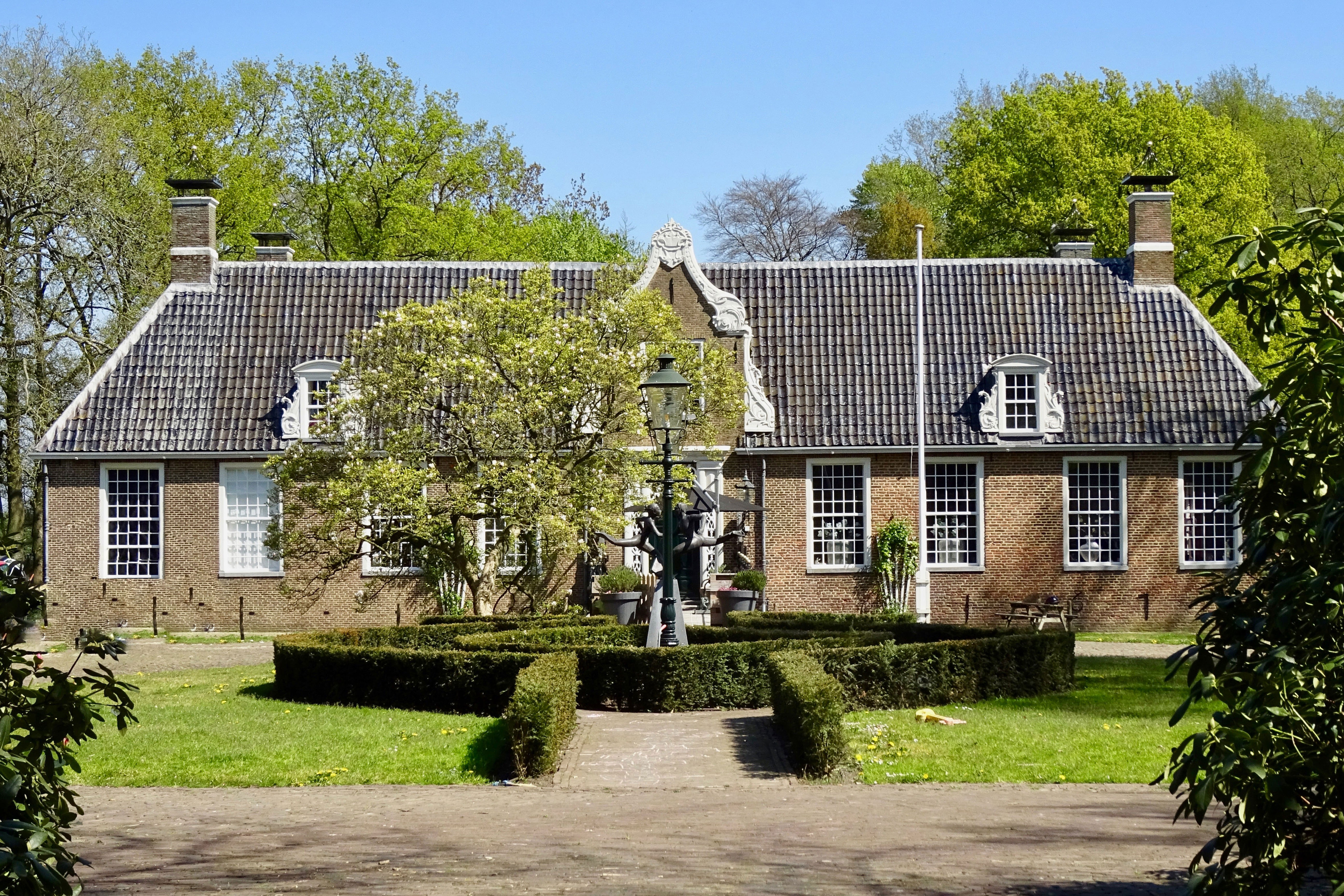
Estate De Klenche

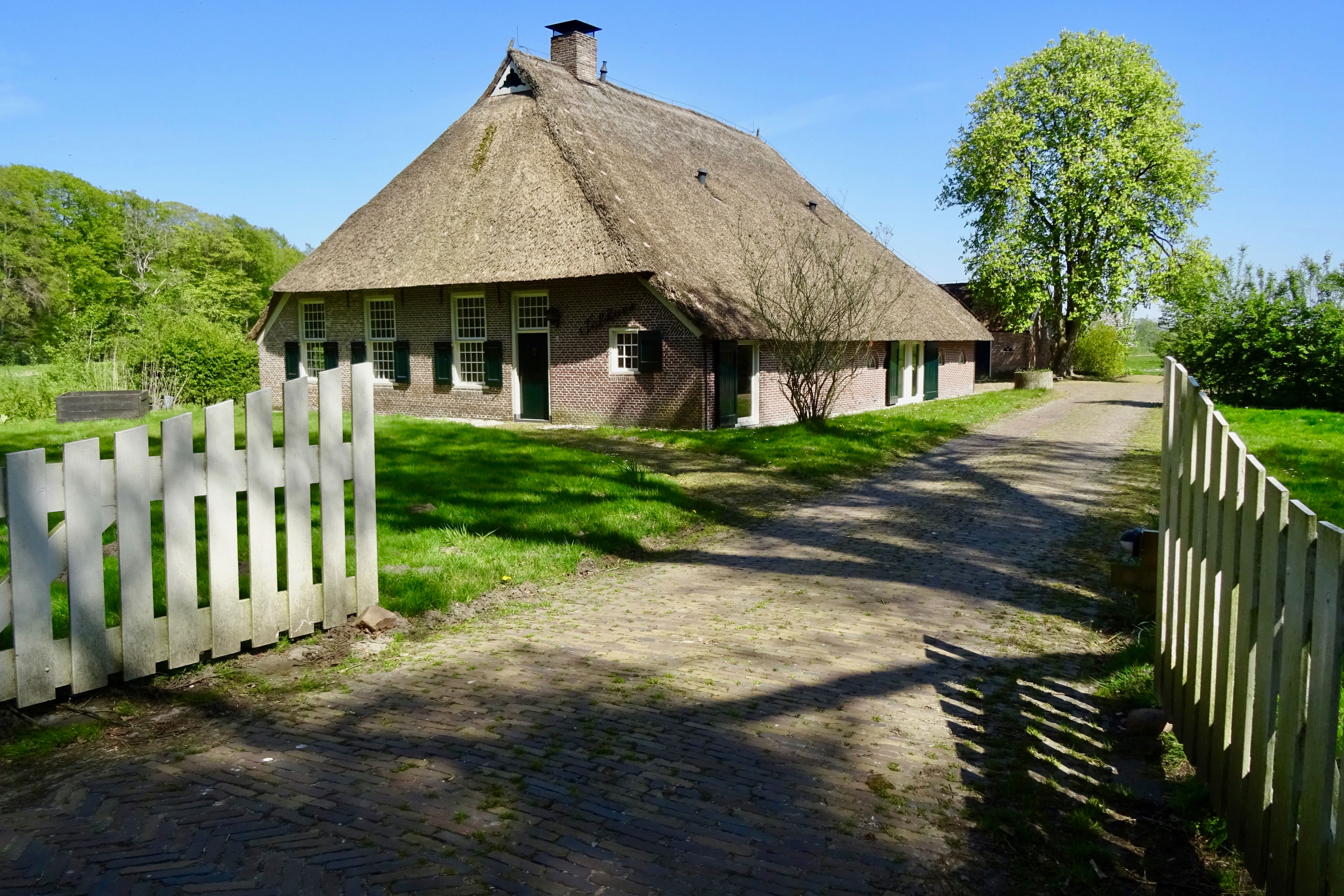
Farm t Tolhoes

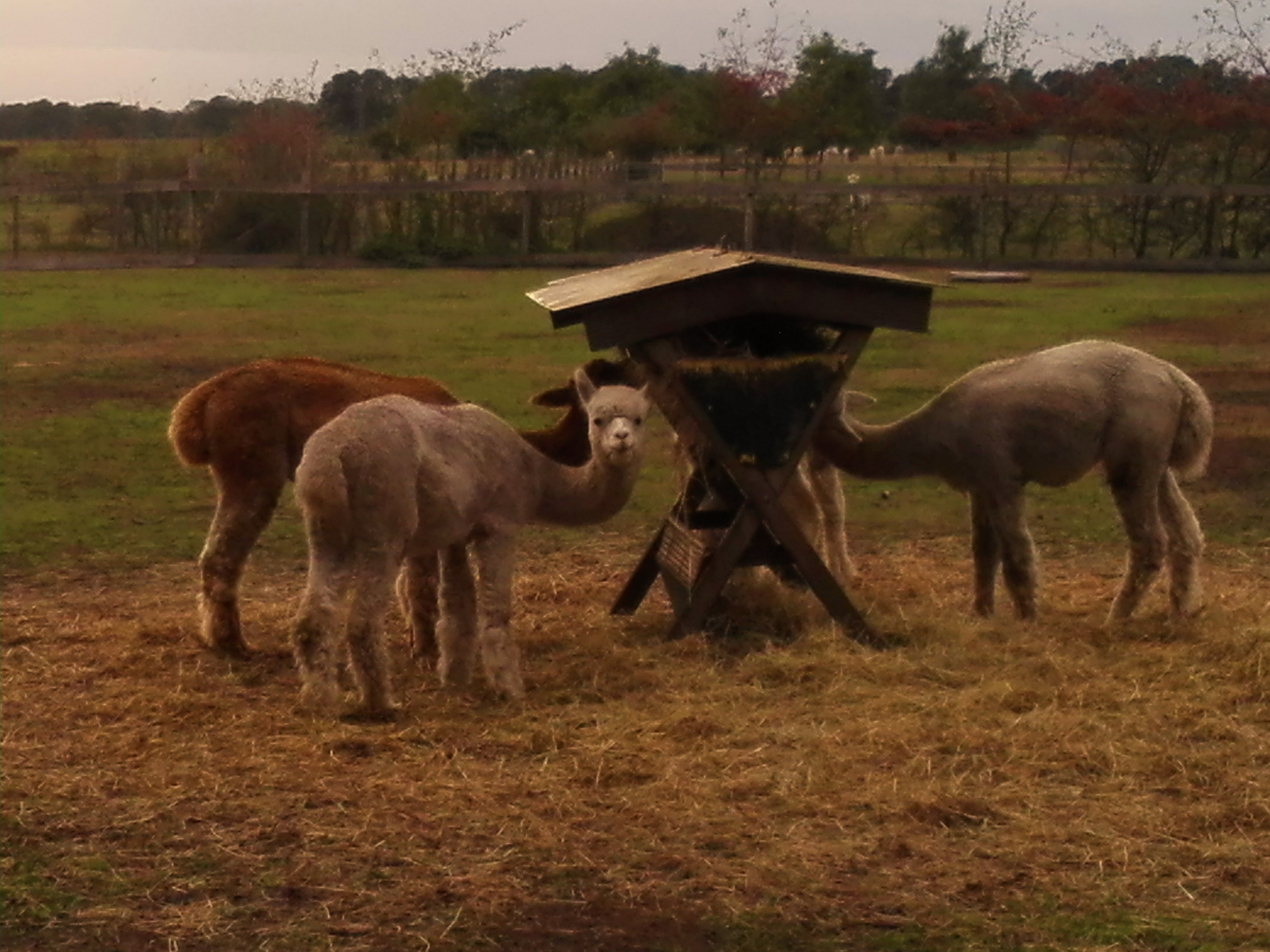
Alpacas in Oosterhesselen

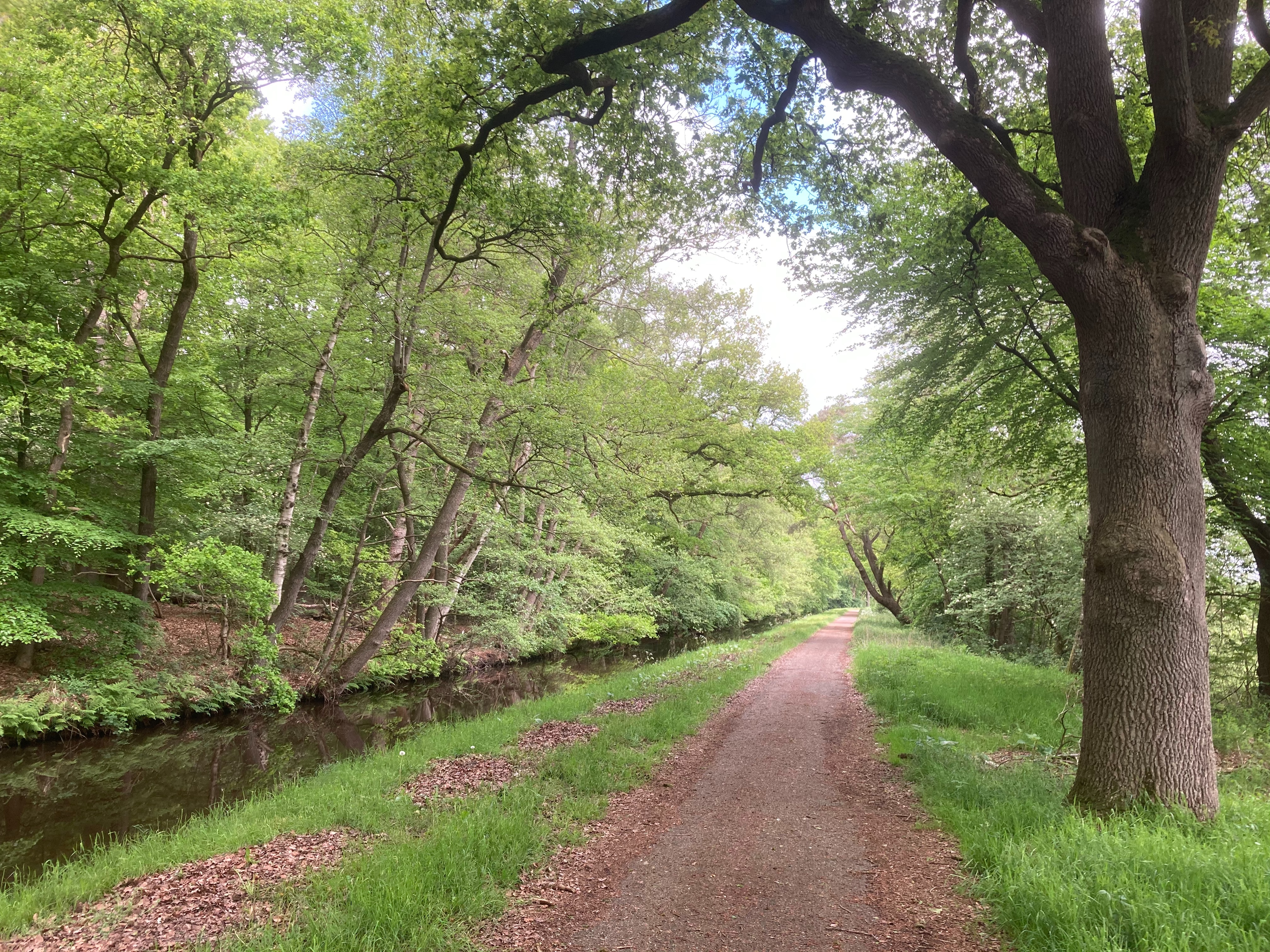
Nature area De Klencke
