= Glanerbeek =

River in Germany

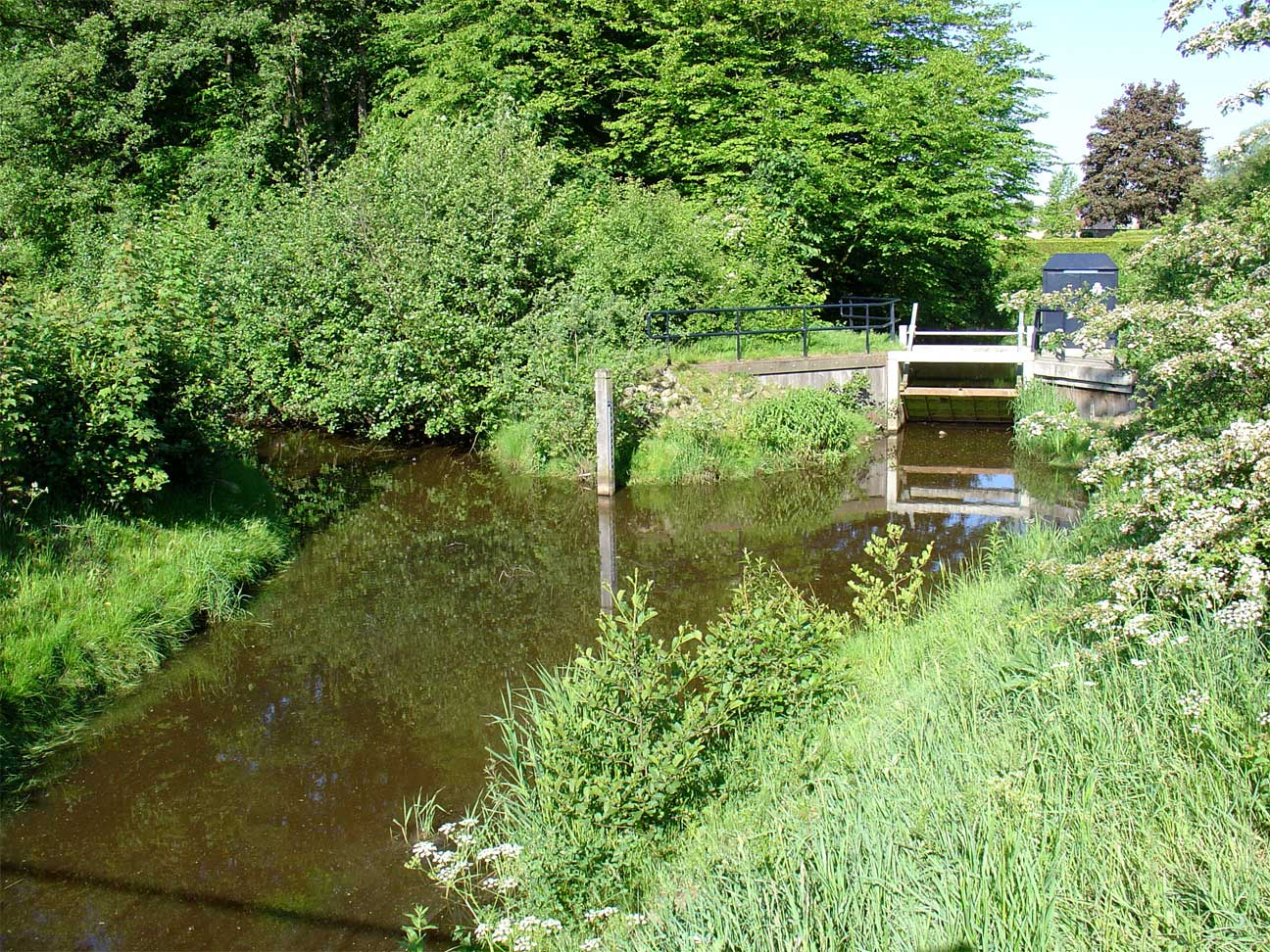

Location
- Countries: Netherlands and Germany
- Province: Overijssel
- State: North Rhine-Westphalia

Physical characteristics
- Mouth
  - location: Dinkel
  - coordinates: 52°14′16″N 7°00′26″E

Basin features
- Progression: Dinkel→ Vechte→ Zwarte Water→ IJsselmeer

Glanerbeek is a river of North Rhine-Westphalia, Germany and Overijssel, Netherlands. It flows into the Dinkel near Losser. As part of the Rhine basin, specifically the Deltarhine region it is managed under the Deltarhine regime; it has been found to be the only river that the regime has contributed to problem solving for, in regards to the issue of river restoration.

== See also ==
- List of rivers of North Rhine-Westphalia
