= Grenzaa =

River in Germany and the Netherlands

Grenzaa (German) Schoonebeker Diep (Dutch)
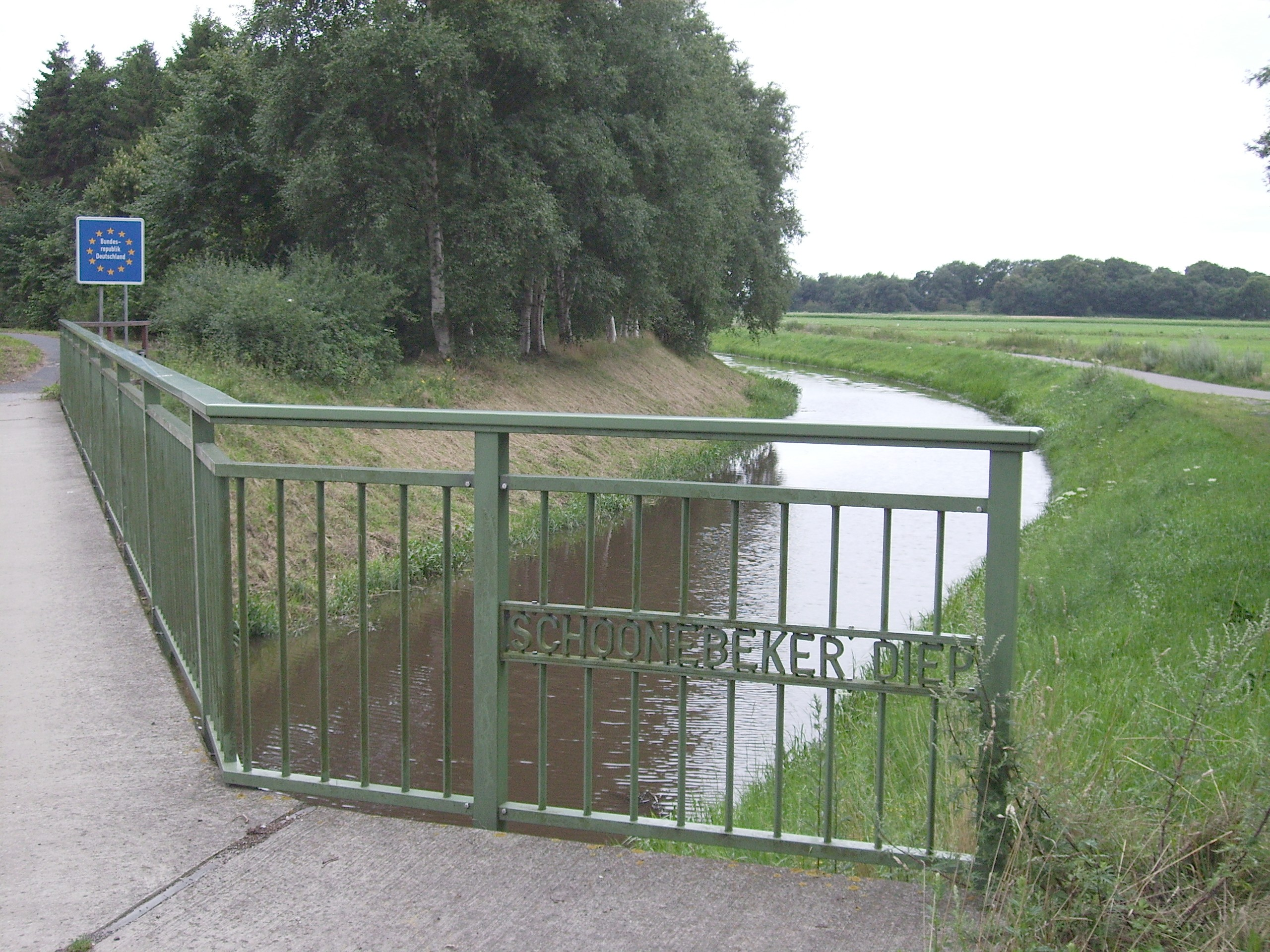

Location
- Countries: Germany and Netherlands
- State: Lower Saxony
- Province: Drenthe

Physical characteristics
- Source
  - coordinates: 52°35′25″N 7°07′05″E
  - elevation: 20 m (66 ft)
- Mouth
  - coordinates: 52.6501°N 6.7725°E
  - elevation: 9 m (30 ft)

Basin features
- Progression: Vechte→ Zwarte Water→ IJsselmeer

Grenzaa or Schoonebeker Diep is a river on the border of Lower Saxony, Germany and Drenthe, Netherlands, near the town Twist. It forms some of the border between the Netherlands and Germany. Through the Coevorden-Piccardie-Kanal and the Coevorden-Vechtkanaal it discharges into the Vechte near Coevorden.

== Gallery ==
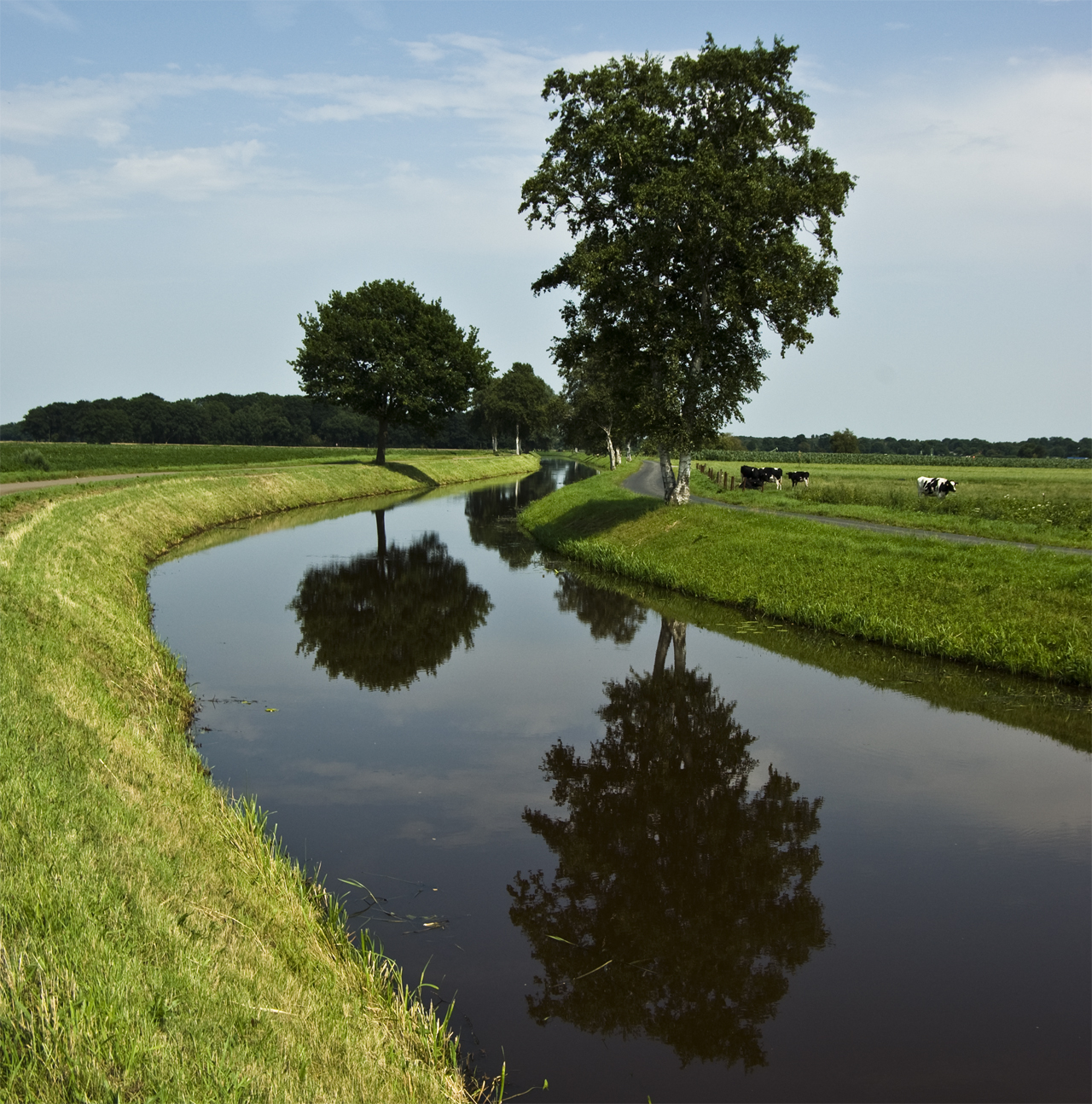

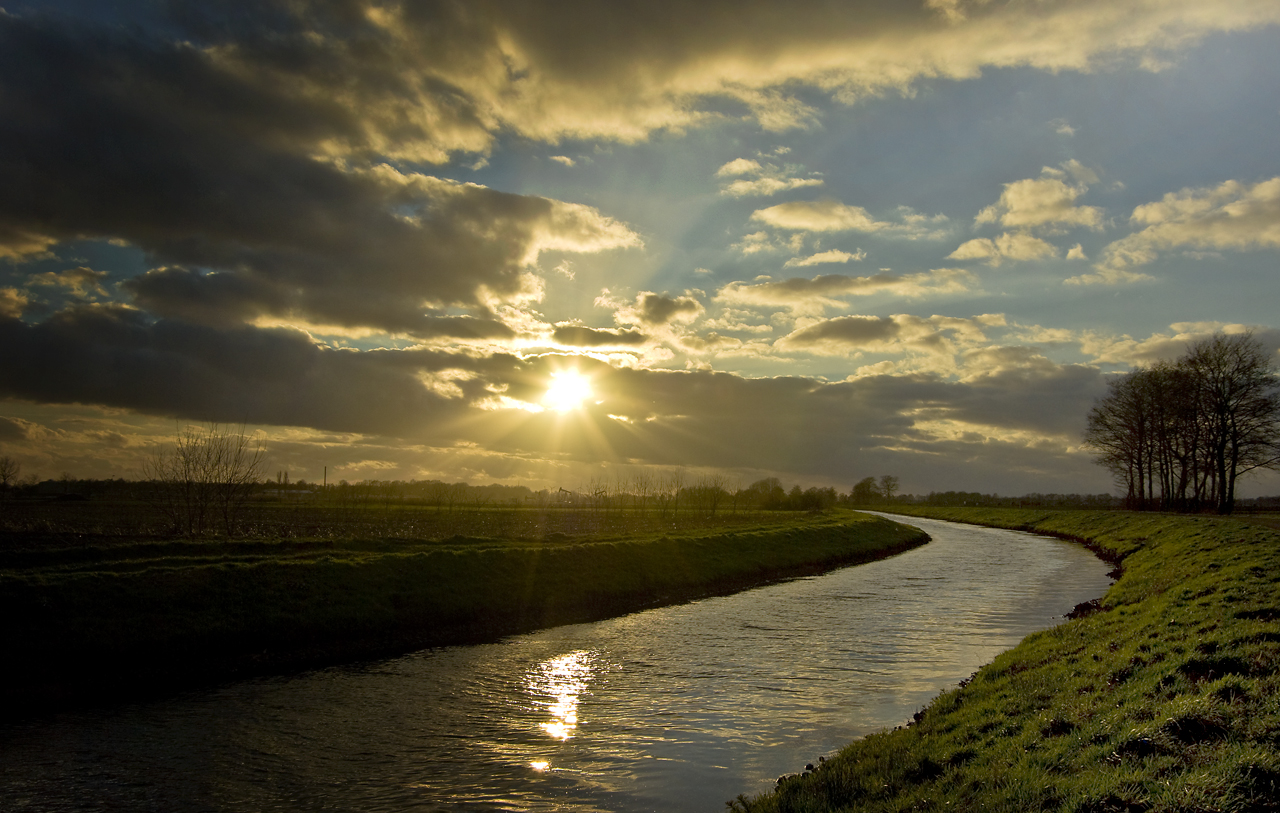

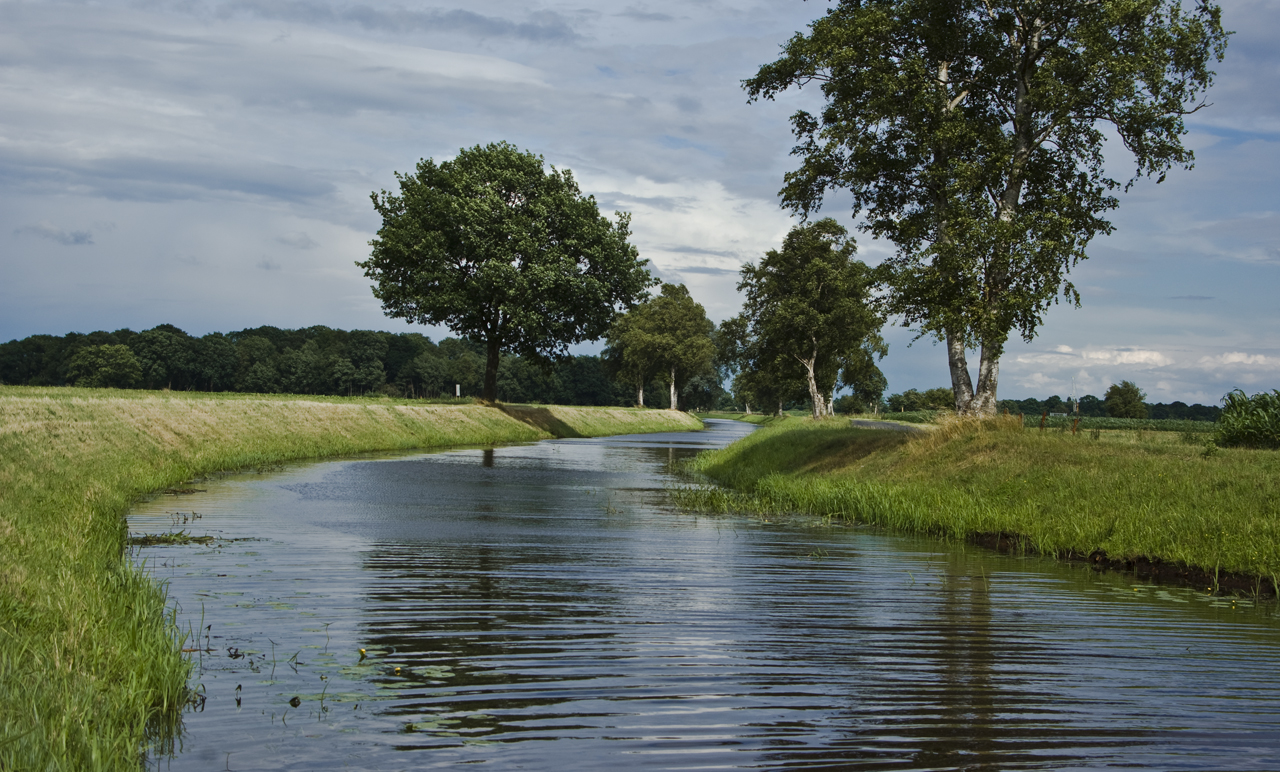

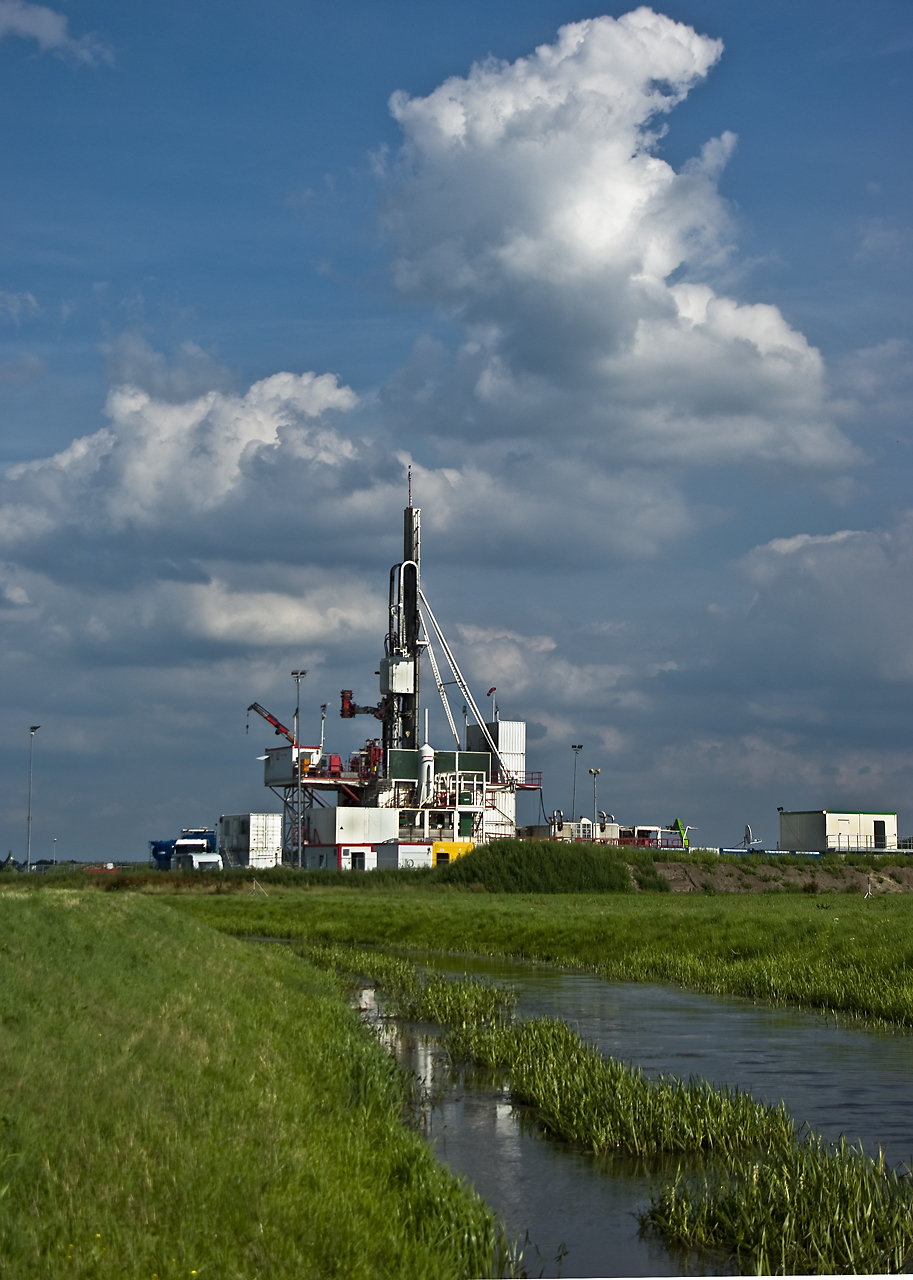

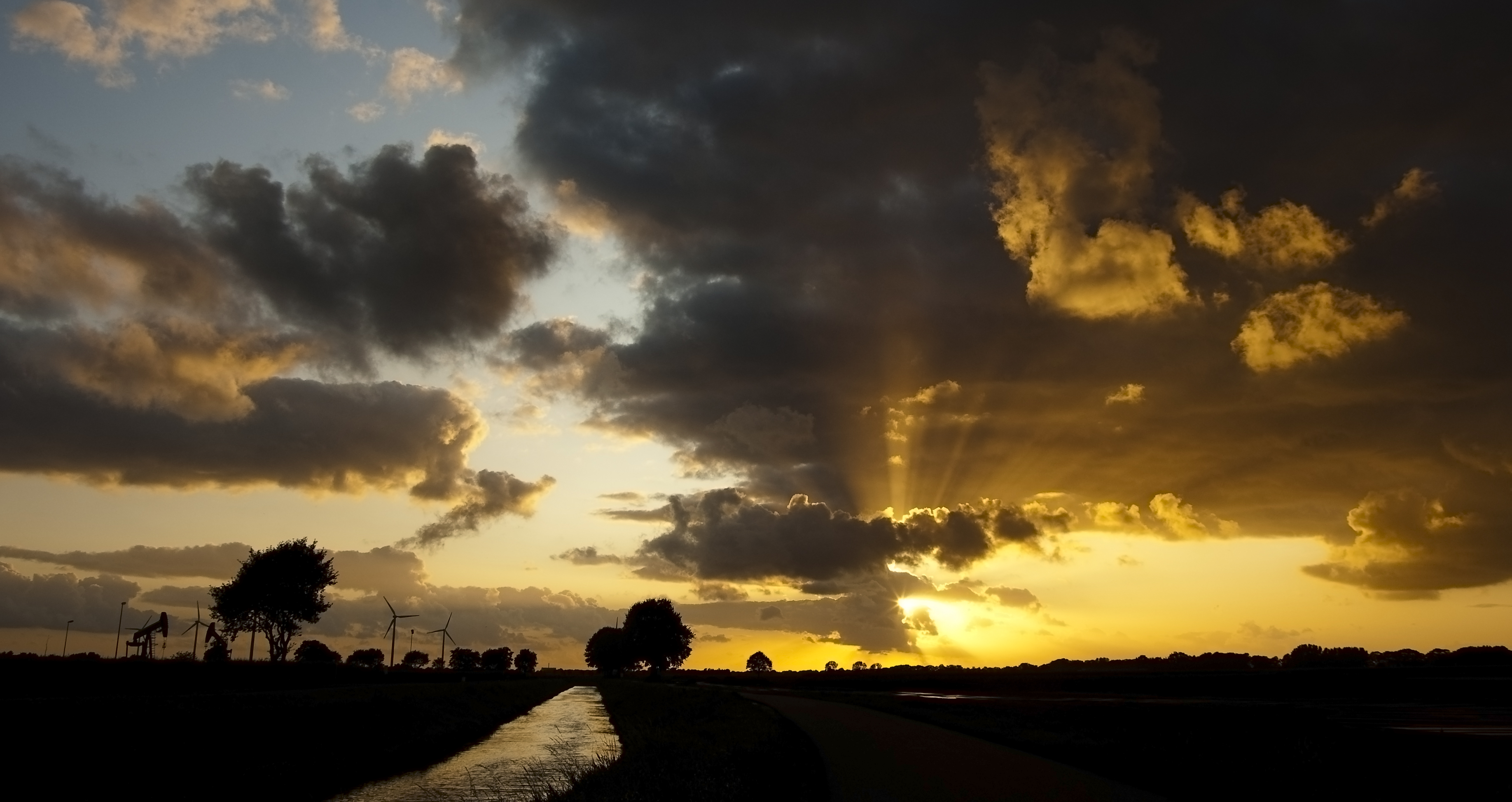

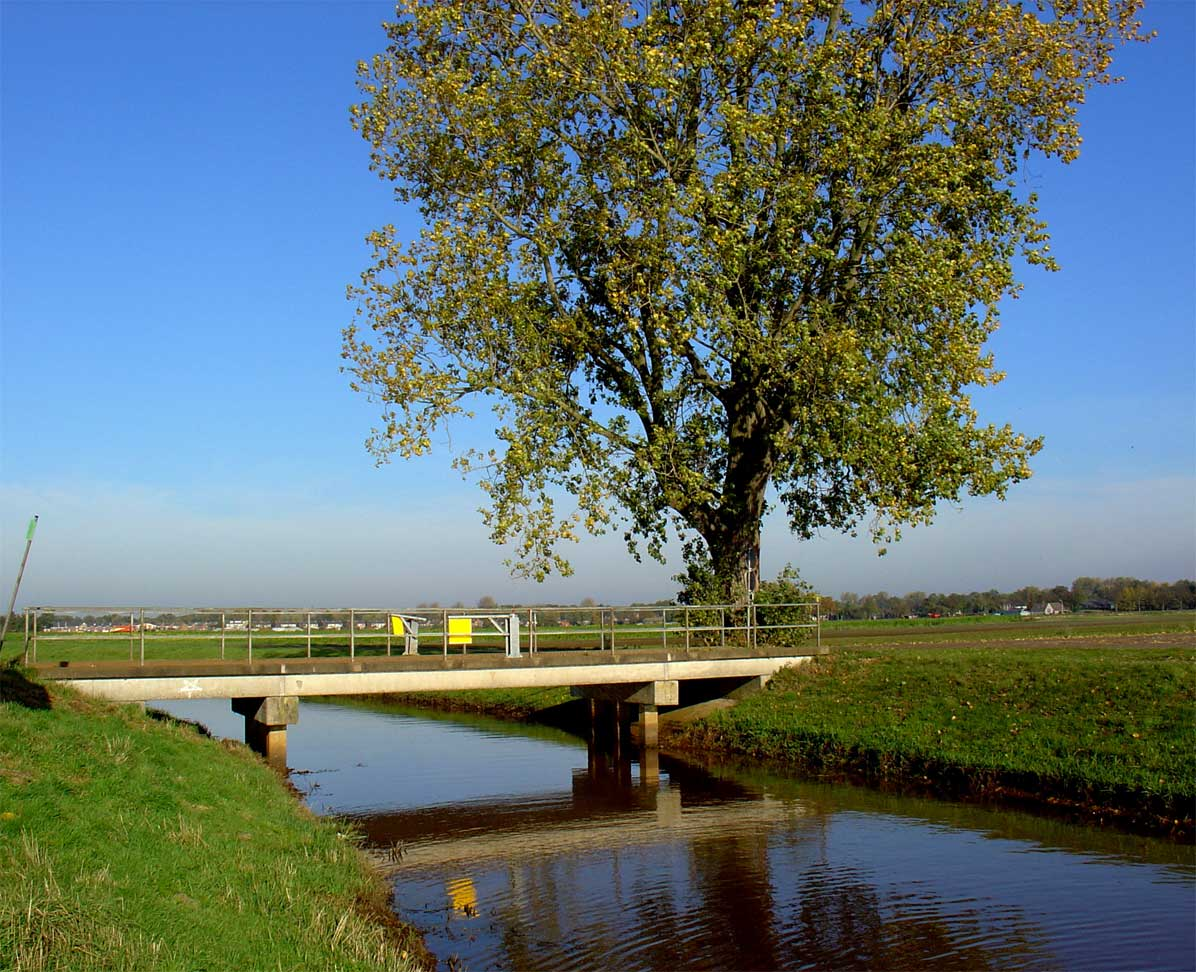

== See also ==
- List of rivers of Lower Saxony
