= Vidrus =

River in Germany

The Vidrus fluvius, Greek Ouidros potamos, is a river of Ptolemy's Geographia (2.11) located in Germania. Its exact location is not known for certain, but it must be in the Low Countries.

Ptolemy places the mouth of the Vidrus next to the mouth of the Rhine. Next in order follows a port, Marnamanis, and then the mouth of the Amisius, or Ems, now in Germany. The next river in that direction is the Visurgis, which is the Weser River.

Ptolemy said that the Rhine had three mouths, one of which was in the "west". It has been proposed that this might have meant the mouth of the IJssel, which today flows from the Rhine near Arnhem. But it did not originally connect to the Rhine: the Romans themselves, under the command of Drusus, joined the two with a canal.

Both the Vechte and the IJssel flowed to the IJsselmeer, formerly the Zuiderzee, which one Roman source (Pomponius Mela) called Flevus Lacus. The Romans were able to send fleets of ships into the Lakes and from there to access the Ems.

Another older connection from the Rhine to the lakes was the Vecht. Although the Romans apparently did not consider it navigable for large ships, it possibly gave access to the Oer-IJ, and from there to Velsen where there was a Roman fortification on the coast, apparently the same one which Tacitus referred to as Flevus. Many scholars (including Smith, Van der Aa, Bruijnesteijn and Anthon) equate the Vecht and the Vidrus. The Vidrus would thus have its sea outlet at IJmuiden.

The 16th-century writer Ortelius says that the Vidrus was the old name for the Regge, a tributary of the Vecht.

Etymologically Vidrus is close to Indo-European *wod-or, which becomes Germanic *watar by Grimm's Law. The d stays on for Germanic *wed-, becoming wet, and there is an –sk- form as well, *wat-skan, "to wash", which might account for the Vecht form. A derivation from "water" is consistent with Ortelius' statement that parts of Holland were called "Waterland."
