= Two Mills (Ruisdael) =

Painting by Jacob van Ruisdael

- Les deux moulins (French)
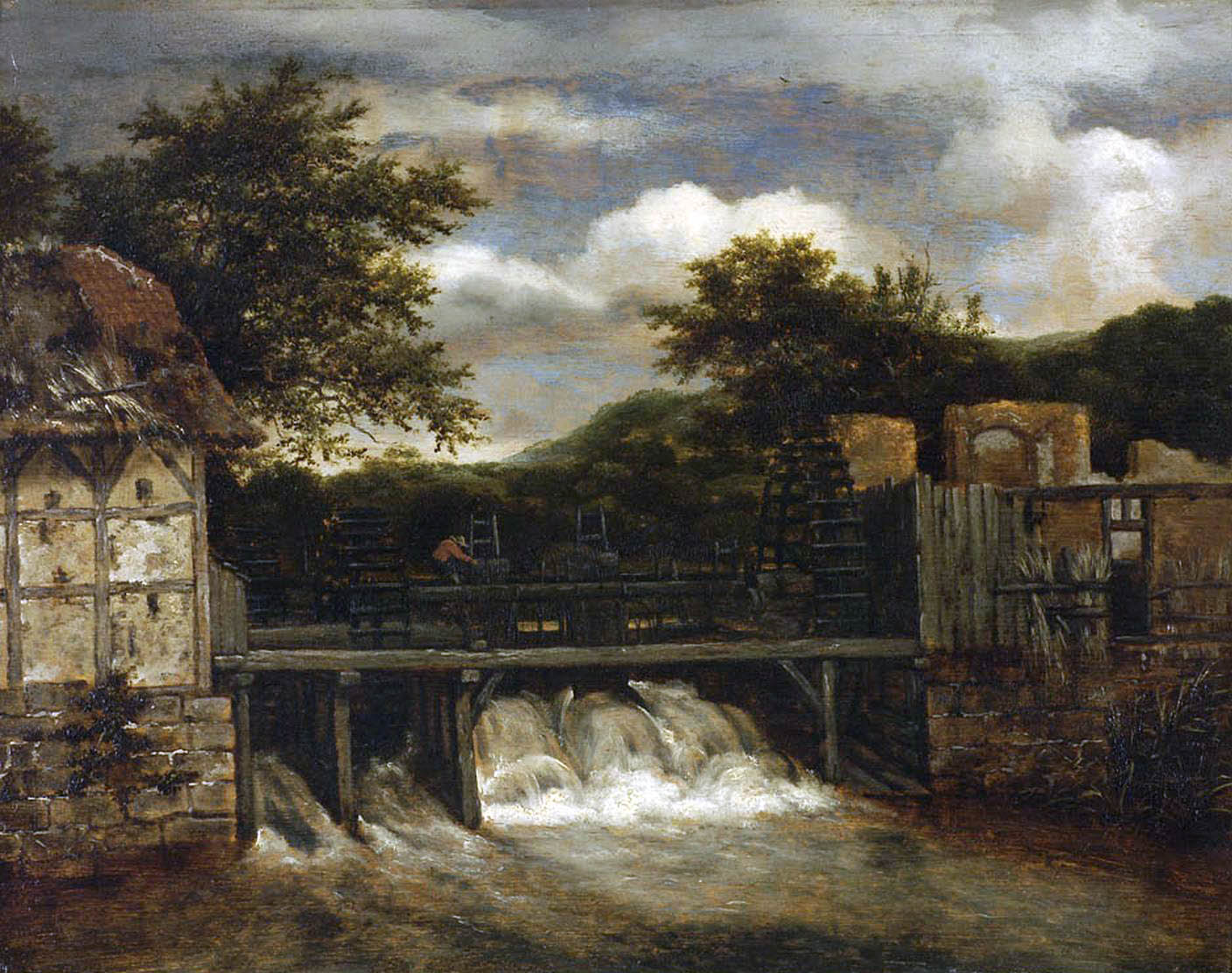
- Artist: Jacob van Ruisdael
- Completion date: 1650s
- Medium: oil painting on panel (oak)
- Movement: Dutch Golden Age painting Landscape painting
- Subject: a watermill a sluice
- Dimensions: 35 cm × 44 cm (14 in × 17 in)
- Location: Musée des Beaux-Arts, Strasbourg
- Accession: circa 1892

Two Mills is a 1650s painting by the Dutch painter Jacob van Ruisdael. It is now in the Musée des Beaux-Arts of Strasbourg, France. Its inventory number is 625.

The painting belongs to a series of depictions of a watermill either at Singraven near Denekamp, or at Haaksbergen near Enschede. It was bought from Martin Henry Colnaghi for the Strasbourg museum by Wilhelm von Bode around 1892; the painting had previously belonged to the collector Albert Levy of London and Colnaghi had bought it at the sale of Levy's collection on 16 June 1876, item number 360, for 126 British pounds (equivalent to £12,570 in 2025).

== See also ==
- List of paintings by Jacob van Ruisdael
