= Dinkel (river) =

River in Germany and the Netherlands

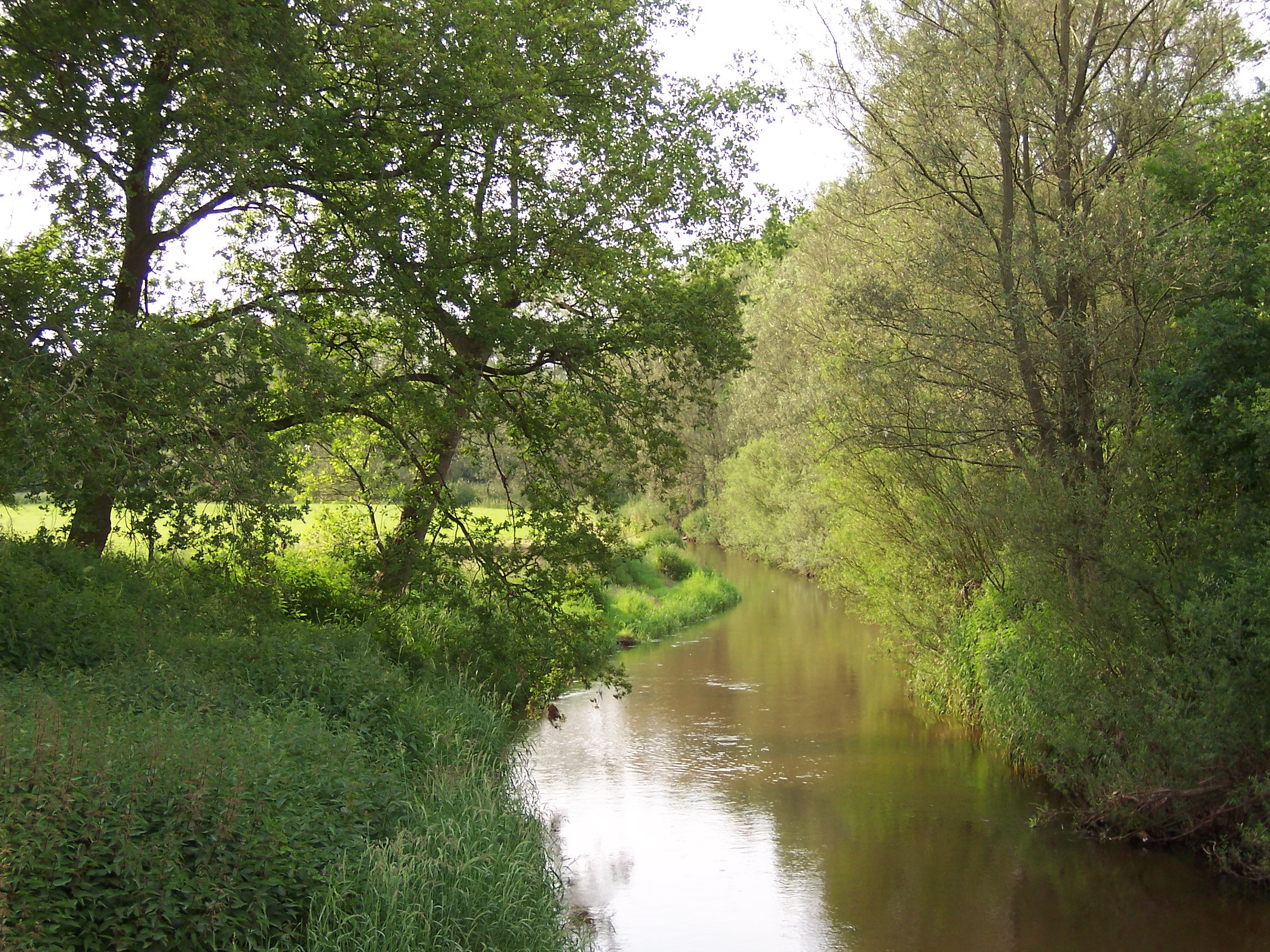
- The Dinkel near Losser

Location
- Countries: Germany and Netherlands

Physical characteristics
- Source
  - location: North Rhine-Westphalia
  - coordinates: 51°59′12″N 7°07′44″E
  - elevation: 80 m (260 ft)
- Mouth
  - location: Vechte
  - coordinates: 52°30′26″N 6°57′47″E
- Length: 89.0 km (55.3 mi)
- Basin size: 641 km^{2} (247 sq mi)

Basin features
- Progression: Vechte→ Zwarte Water→ IJsselmeer

The Dinkel is a river in Germany and the Netherlands, left tributary of the Vecht. Its total length is 89 km (55 mi), of which 47 km (29 mi) in Germany. The Dinkel originates in North Rhine-Westphalia, Germany, between Ahaus and Coesfeld. It flows north to Gronau, crosses the border with the Netherlands (Overijssel), flows through Losser, Denekamp, and recrosses the border to Germany (Lower Saxony). The Dinkel joins the Vechte in Neuenhaus.

Jacob van Ruisdael depicted the landscape of the Dinkel and its watermills near Denekamp in his work Two Watermills and an Open Sluice near Singraven. These watermills still exist.

In the Netherlands the river gave name to the village of Overdinkel and to the municipality of Dinkelland.

Near Denekamp some of the waters of the Dinkel are used to regulate the levels of the Almelo-Nordhorn canal.

== Gallery ==
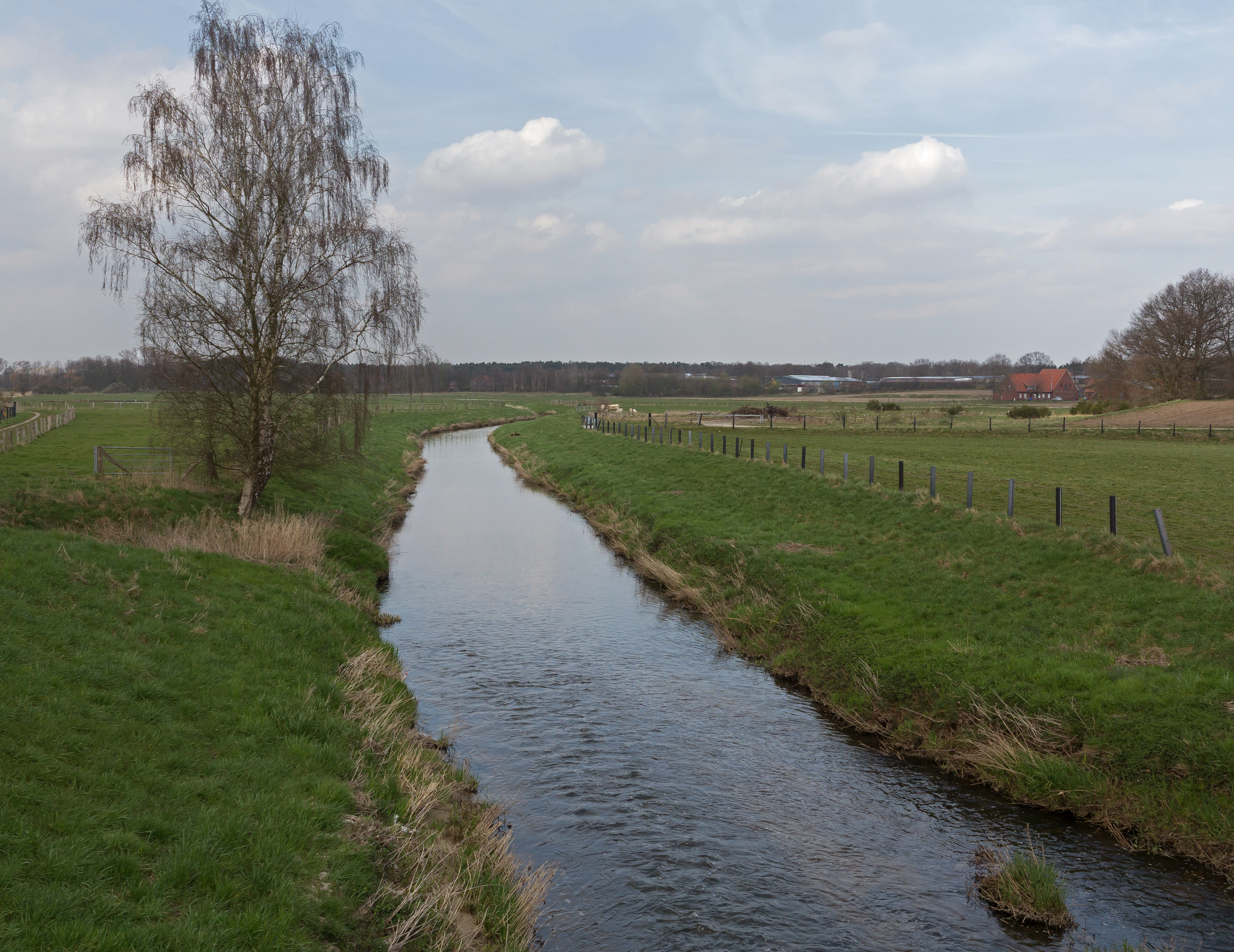
The Dinkel near Heek

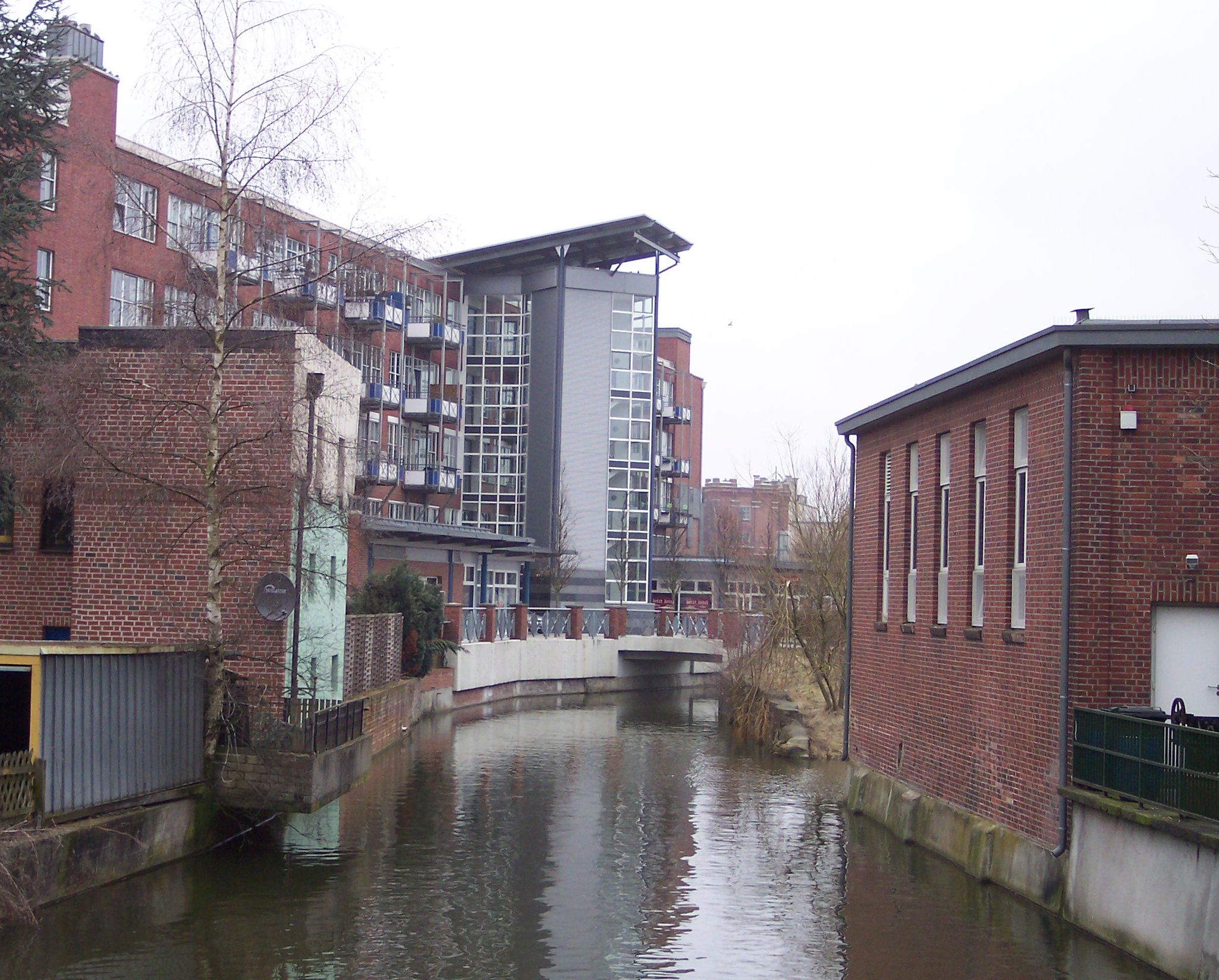
The Dinkel in Gronau

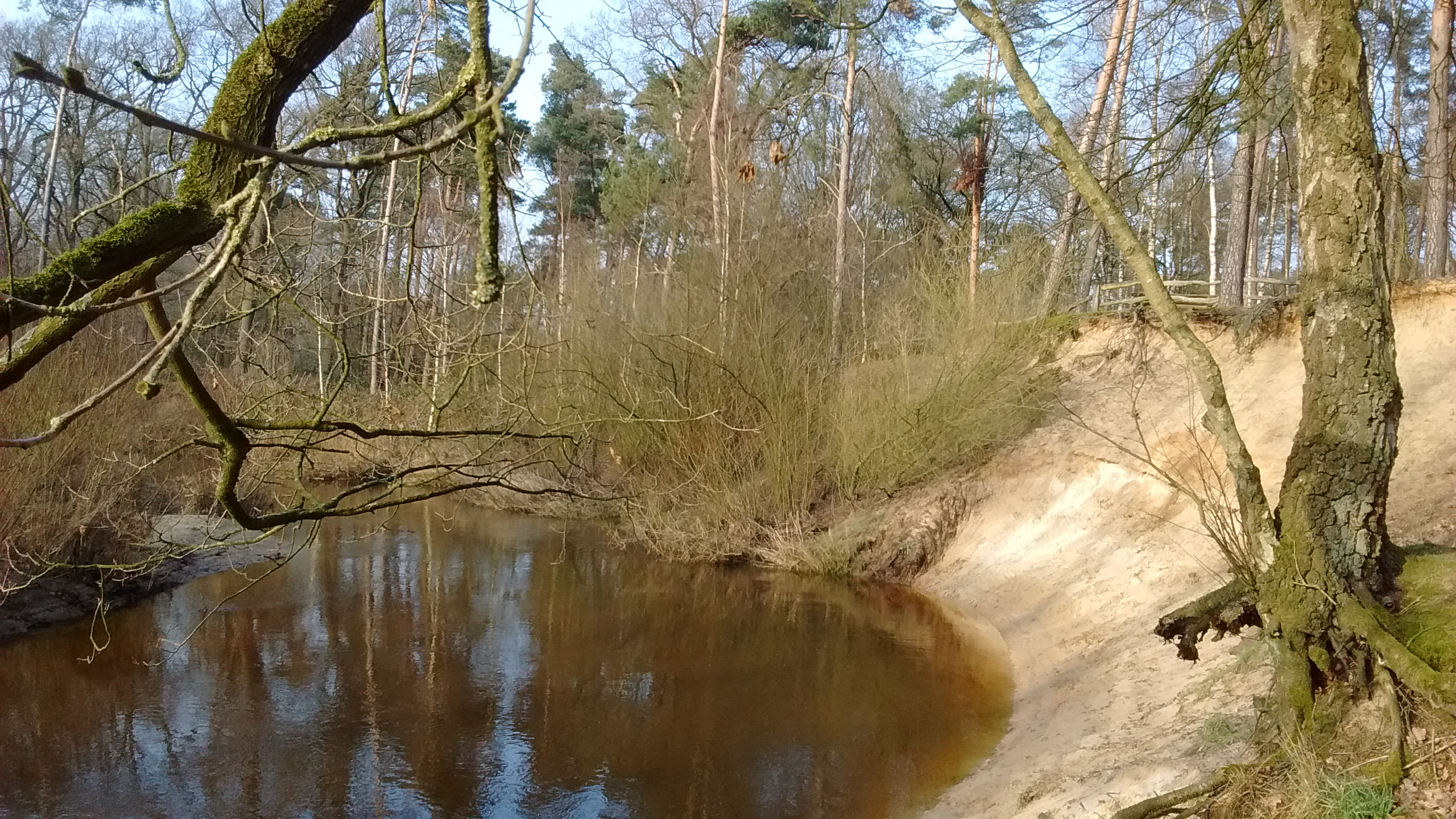
near De Lutte

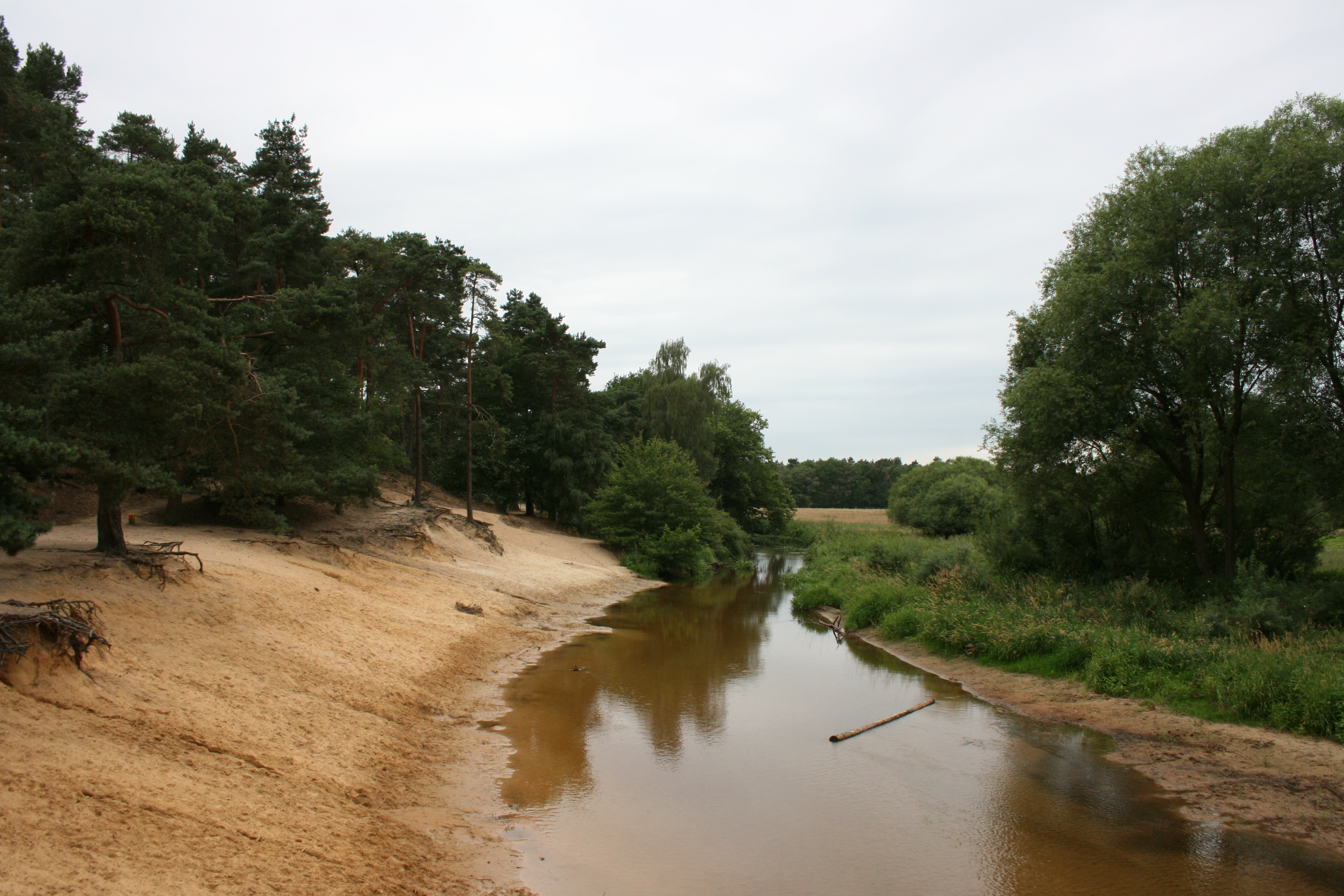
The Dinkel in Lutterzand

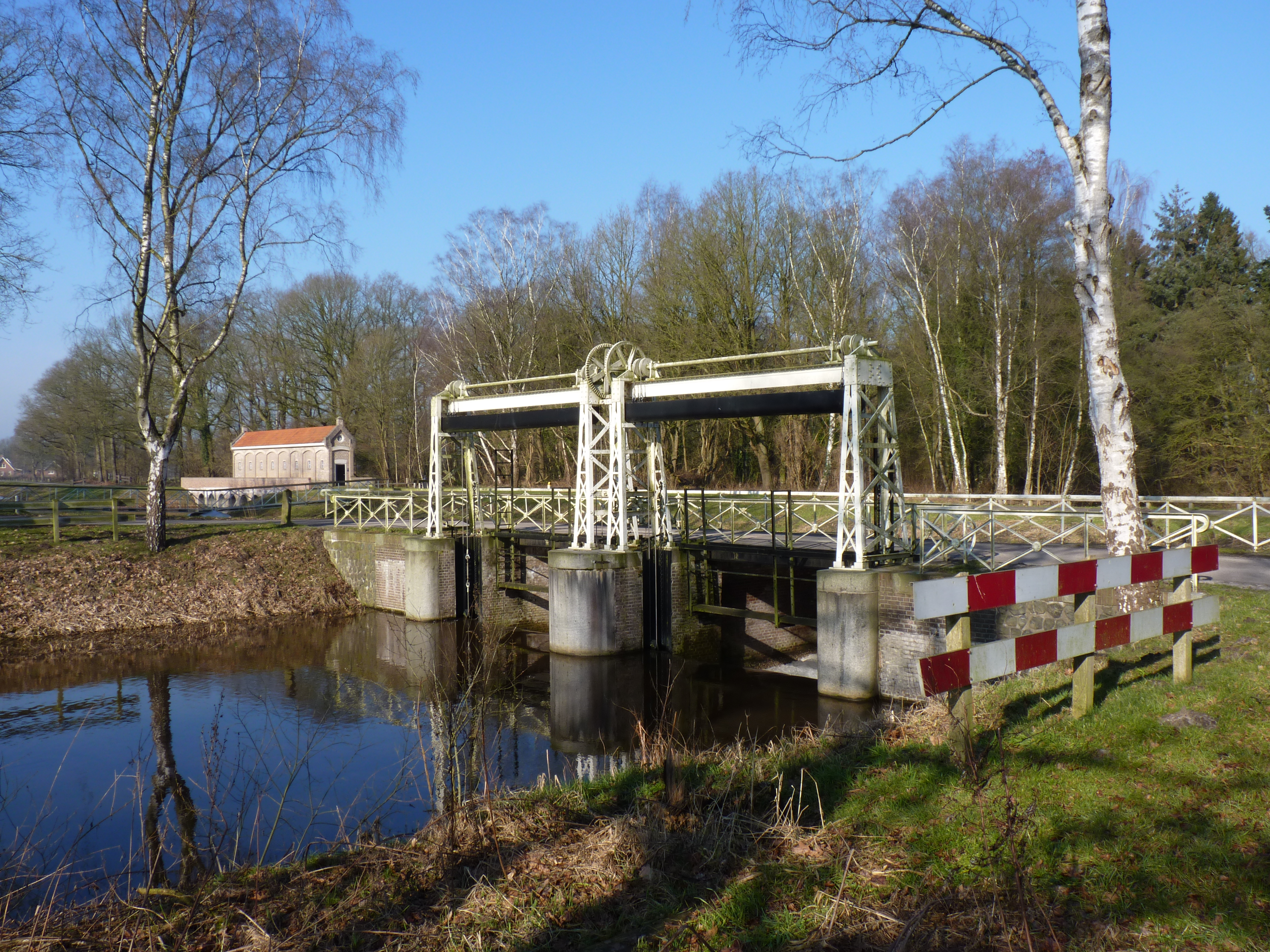
near Denekamp

== See also ==
- List of rivers of the Netherlands
- List of rivers of North Rhine-Westphalia
- List of rivers of Lower Saxony
