= Deltarhine region =

River basin district along German-Dutch border

The Deltarhine region is a river basin district of the Rhine basin, consisting of the Dinkel, the Berkel, and the Oude IJssel regional river basins. It covers 11,000 square kilometres and straddles the German-Dutch border, with 65% in the Netherlands and 35% in Germany.

It is covered by an international water management regime between the two countries, the Deltarhine regime.

== Designation ==
The Water Framework Directive, or Directive 2000/60/EC is a European Union directive intended to enable the sustainable management of inland water resources. Under the directive, member states are instructed to determine individual river basins, along with their aquifers, transitional waters, and coastal waters, and assign them to one or more river basin districts. Small river basins, such as those in Cornwall, might be grouped together in a single district, while large basins might be split into multiple.

The Rhine basin is one of the later; in order to properly manage its 185,000 square kilometres covering ten countries, it has been split into nine river basin districts, of which the Deltarhine is the furthest downstream.

== Deltarhine Regime ==
The region is managed by an international water management regime between the Netherlands and Germany, the Detlarhine regime. While the regime has only formally existed since 2000, cooperation started decades prior, in the 1960s, primarily at a regional level. This cooperation has seen minimal results; a 2014 study found that almost all respondents agreed that the effect of the regime, in terms of water management practice and domestic policies, was marginal, although there were benefits in terms of communication and knowledge transfer.

== Sources ==
- Renner, T.; Meijerink, S.; van der Zaag, P. (24 August 2018). "The evolution of regional cross-border water regimes, the case of Deltarhine". Journal of Environmental Planning and Management. 61 (10): 1701–1721. doi:10.1080/09640568.2017.1371005. hdl:2066/196886. S2CID 158294731.
- Renner, Tobias; Meijerink, Sander; van der Zaag, Pieter; Smits, Toine (June 2021). "Assessment framework of actor strategies in international river basin management, the case of Deltarhine". International Environmental Agreements: Politics, Law and Economics. 21 (2): 255–283. doi:10.1007/s10784-020-09512-5. hdl:2066/225035. S2CID 222279396.
- Koundouri, P.; Papandreou, N.; Remoundou, K.; Kountouris, Y. (2014). "A Bird's Eye View of the Greek Water Situation: The Potential for the Implementation of the EU WFD" (PDF). Water Resources Management Sustaining Socio-Economic Welfare. Global Issues in Water Policy. Vol. 7. pp. 1–24. doi:10.1007/978-94-007-7636-4_1. ISBN 978-94-007-7635-7.
- Chave, Peter A. (2001). The EU water framework directive : an introduction. London: IWA Publishing. ISBN 9781900222129.
