= Two Watermills and an Open Sluice near Singraven =

Painting by Jacob van Ruisdael

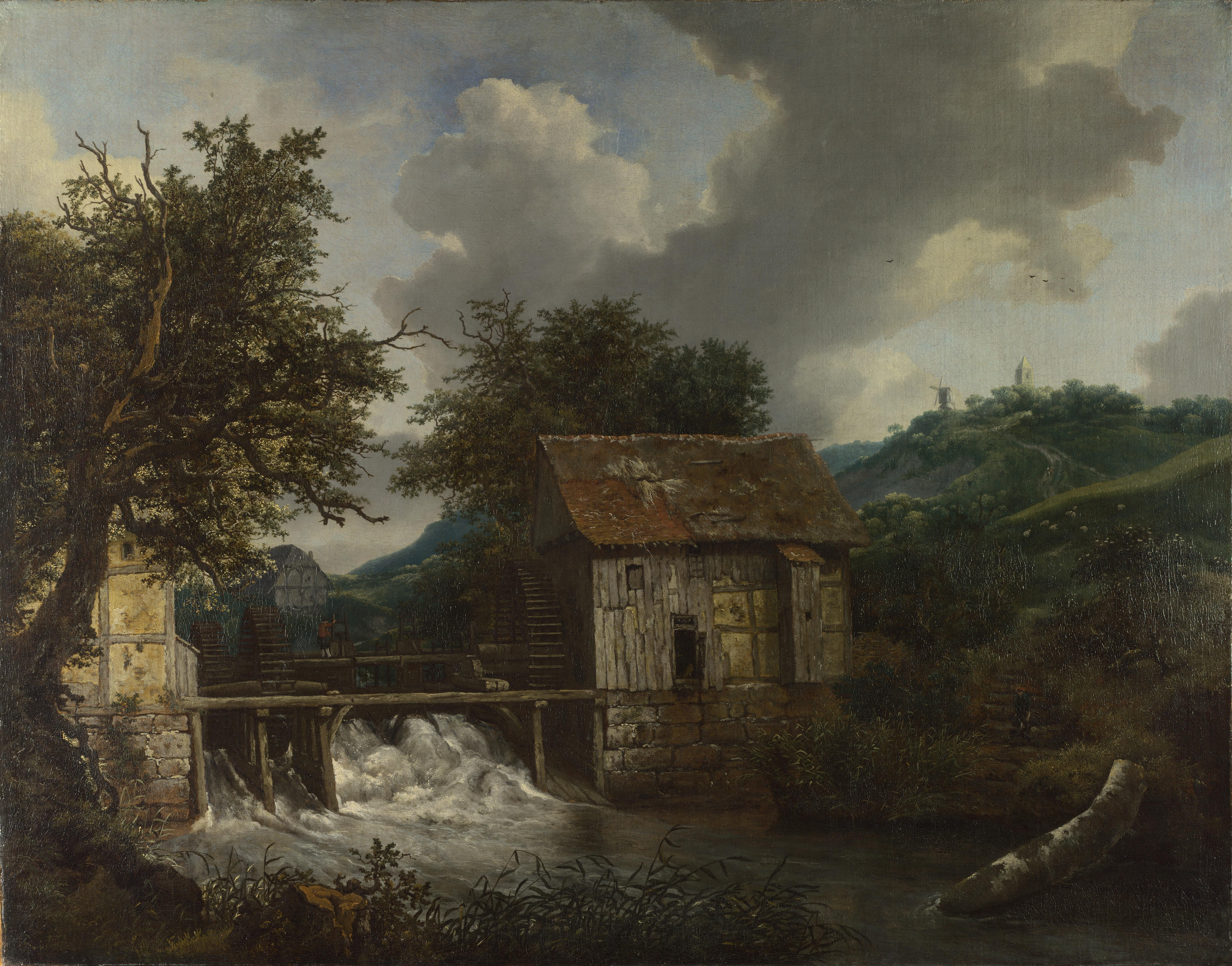
- Artist: Jacob van Ruisdael
- Year: c. 1650
- Dimensions: 87.3 cm × 111.5 cm (34.4 in × 43.9 in)
- Location: National Gallery, London

Two Watermills and an Open Sluice near Singraven (c. 1650) is an oil on canvas painting by the Dutch landscape painter Jacob van Ruisdael. It is an example of Dutch Golden Age painting and is now in the collection of the National Gallery since 1876.

This painting was documented by Hofstede de Groot in 1911, who wrote; "148. THE WATER-MILLS. Sm. 17. In the left centre are two water-mills on either side of a stream flowing to the right front. The mill to the left is partly cut off by the frame and hidden by an oak tree. Between the mills are three water-wheels, two on the left and one on the right, with an open sluice-gate in the centre, through which the stream rushes down. A man stands on the footbridge above raising the gate. Behind the mill on the right is a tree. Beyond the sluice on the right bank is another house. On the left bank in front are reeds. In the right foreground is a tree-trunk in the water, with plants on the bank. A flight of steps goes up the right bank to a path up a hill, on the top of which, in the right distance, are a village church and a wind-mill amid trees. Cloudy sky. The same mills, seen from a nearer standpoint, but without the landscape on the right and with the right-hand mill in ruins, are represented in 157.

Signed in full; canvas, 34 inches by 43 1/2 inches. Sale. Thomas Emmerson, London, 1832 (504). In the collection of Wynn Ellis, 1854 (Waagen, ii. 297); bequeathed in 1876 to the National Gallery. In the National Gallery, London, Wynn Ellis bequest, 1906 catalogue, No. 986."

This scene is very similar to other paintings Ruisdael made in this period of watermills and these often served as inspiration for later painters of landscape. This location has been determined to be Singraven, part of Dinkelland near Ootmarsum, subject of more paintings by Ruisdael.

== Gallery ==
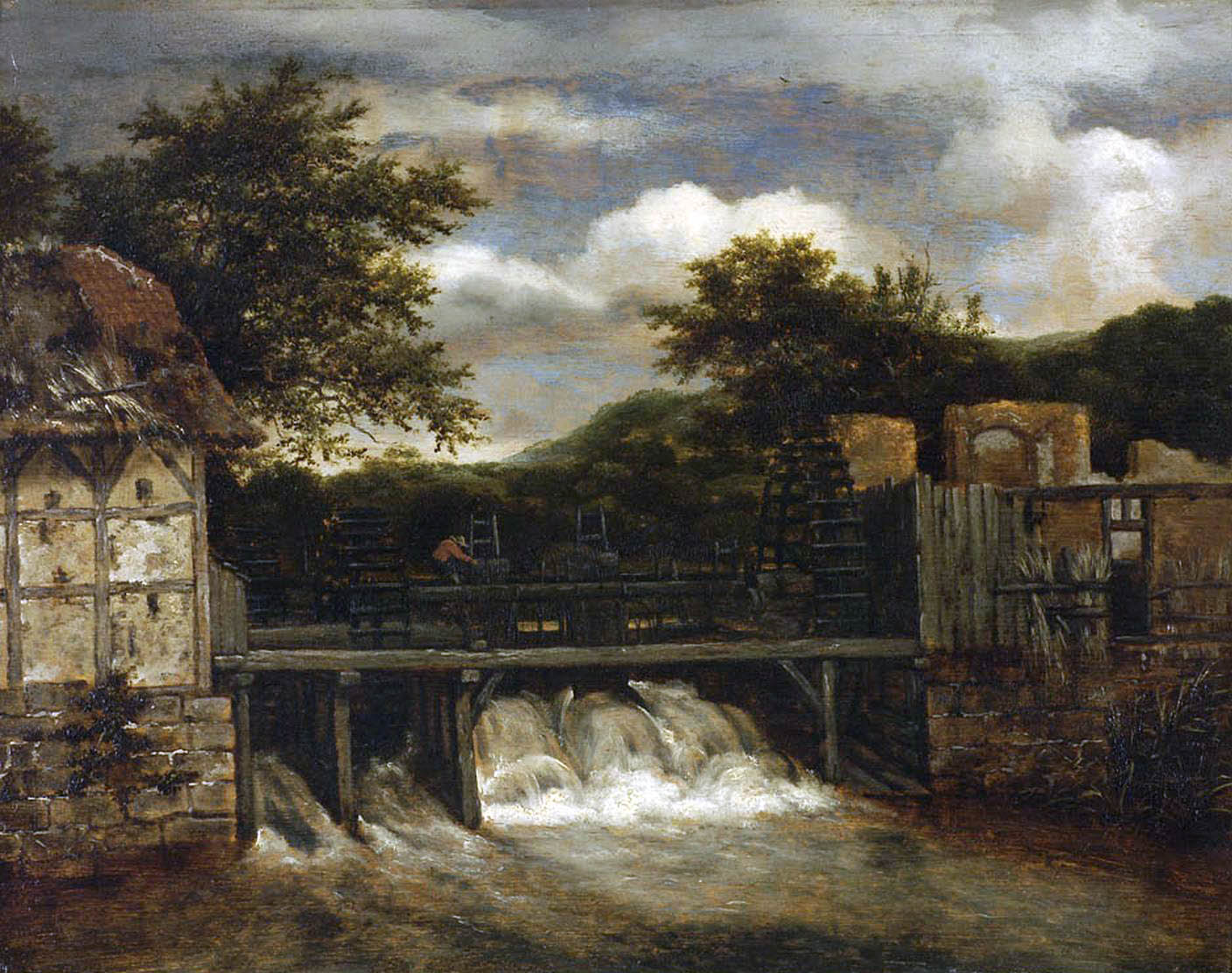
Two Mills, Musée des Beaux-Arts de Strasbourg.

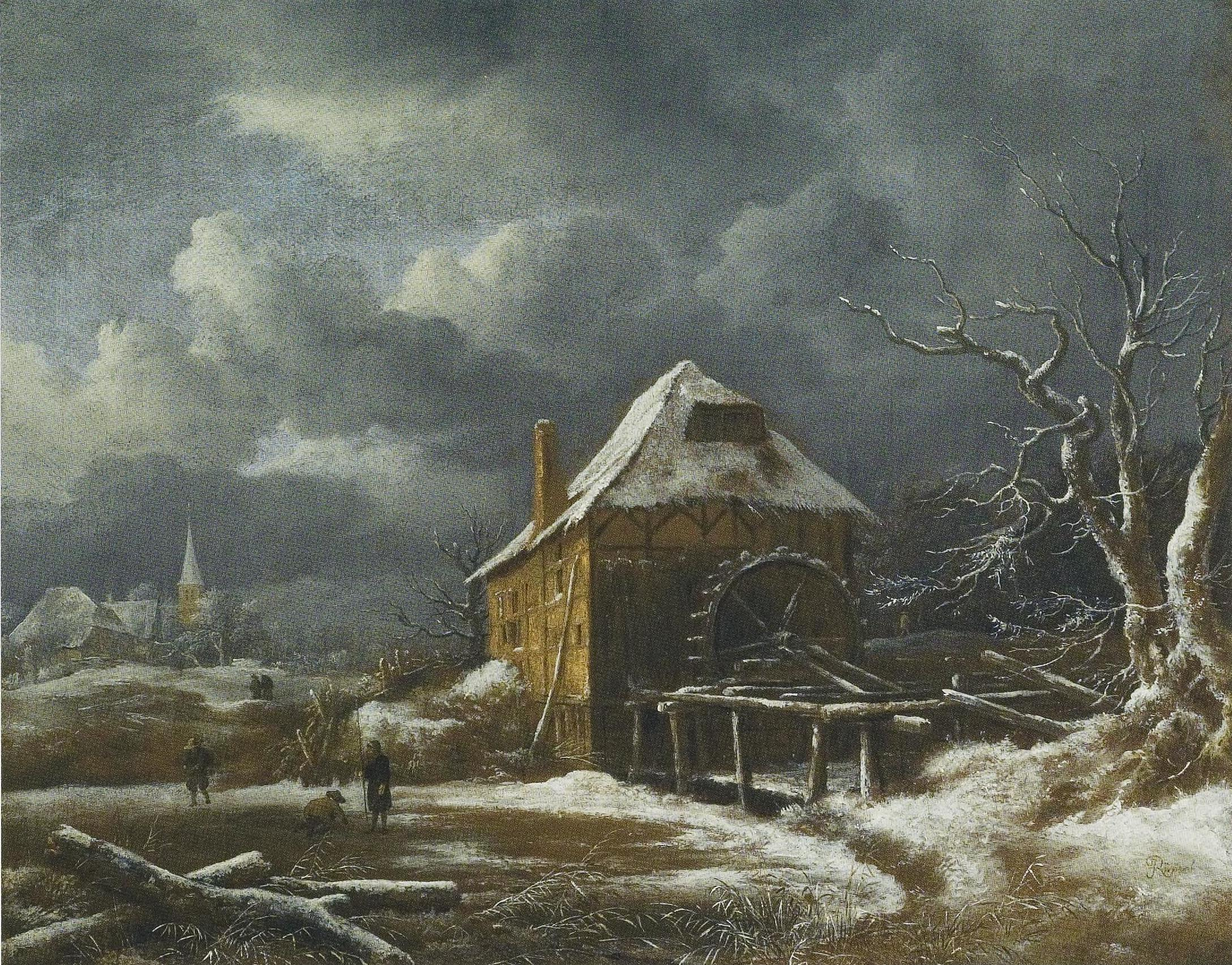
Private collection.

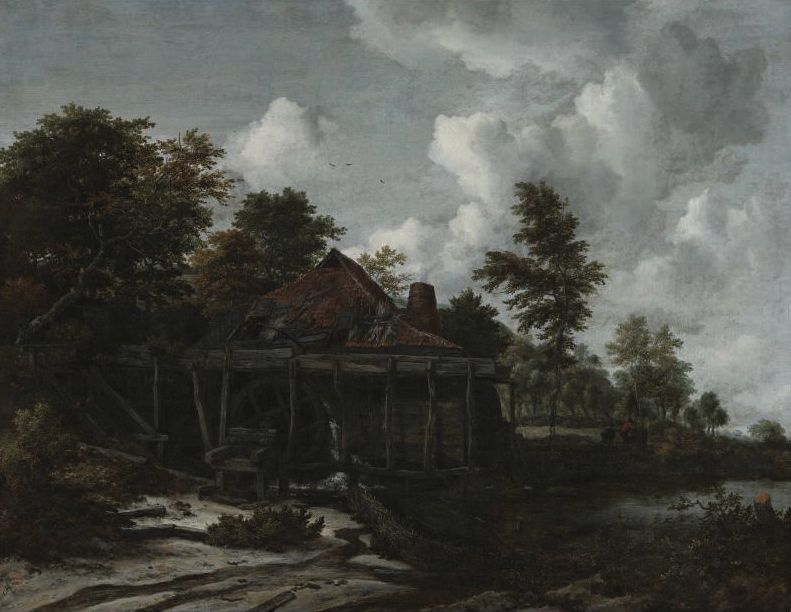
Private collection.

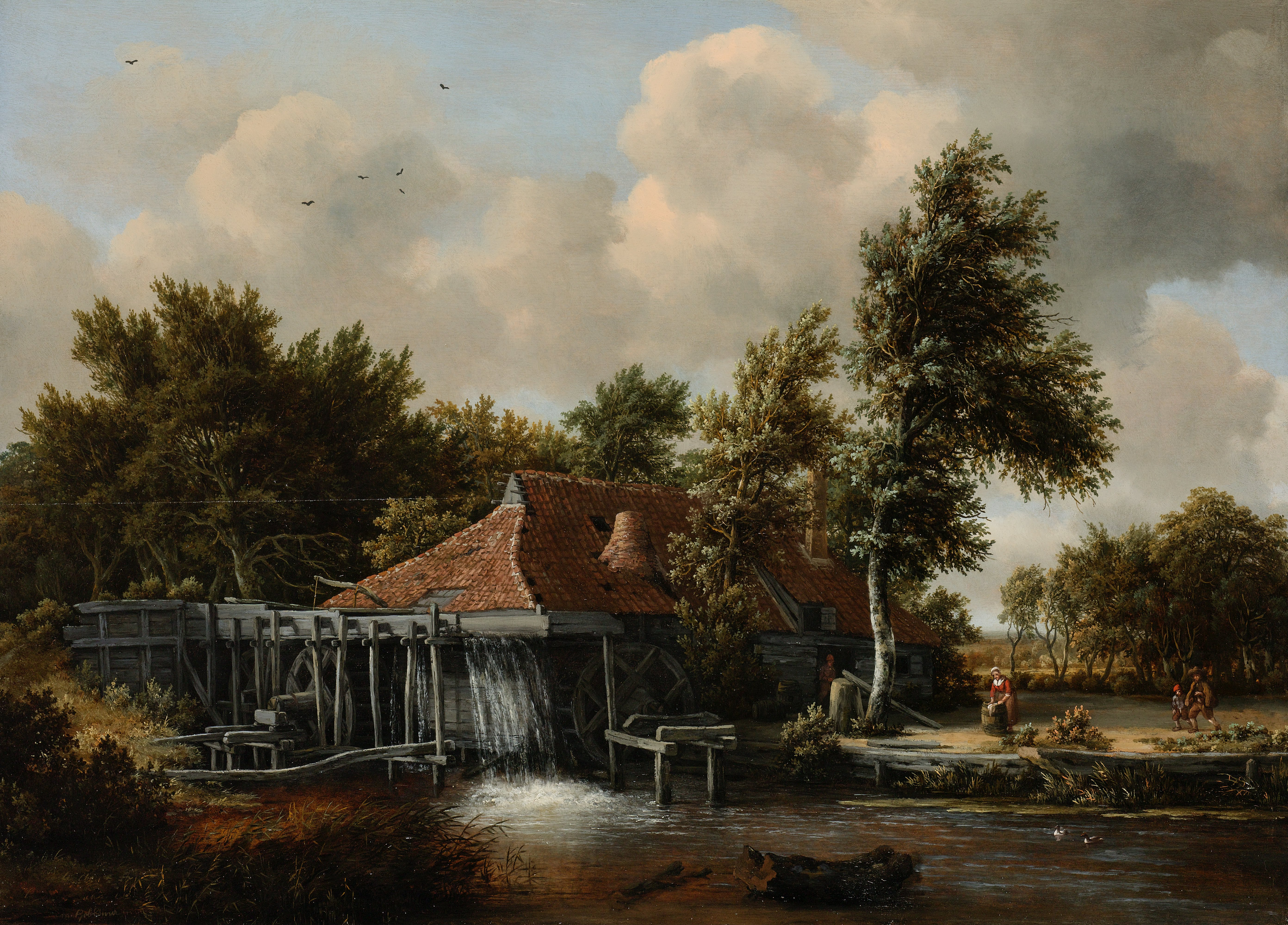
Same mill by Meindert Hobbema, Rijksmuseum.

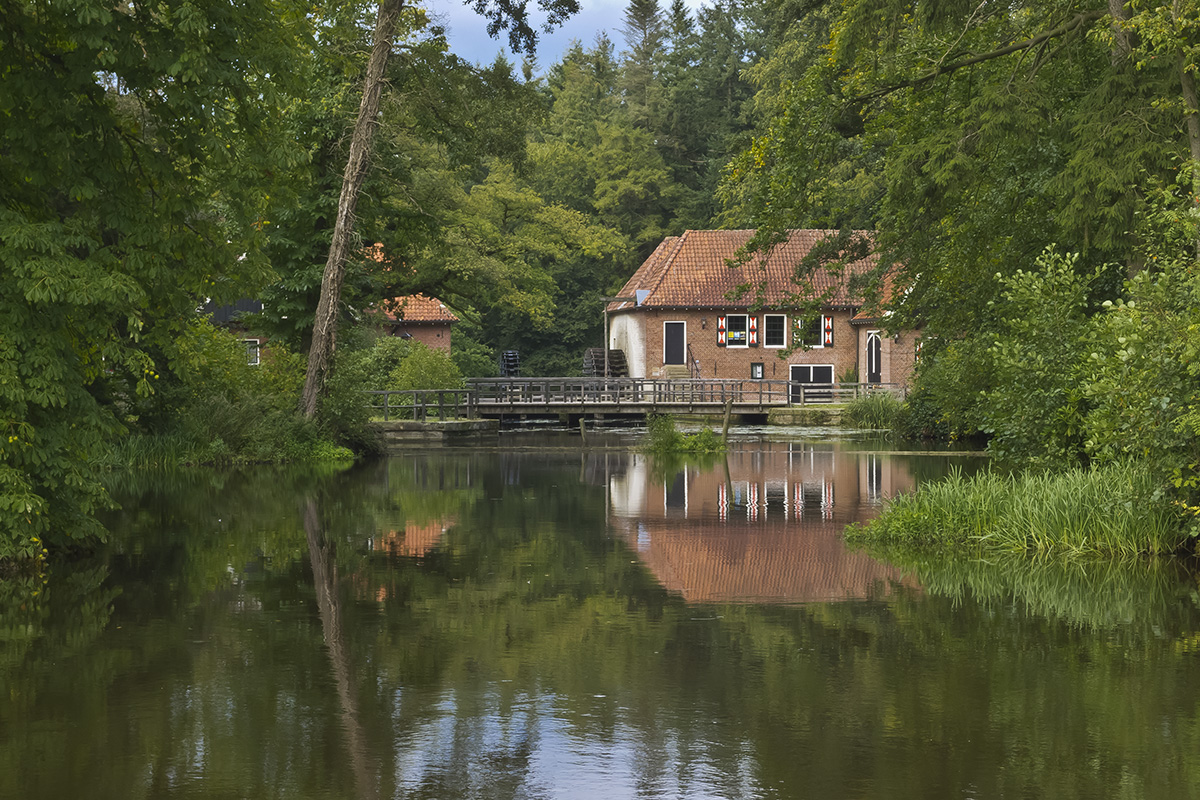
Watermills of Singraven in 2013

== See also ==
- List of paintings by Jacob van Ruisdael
