= Overijssel =

Province of the Netherlands

Overijssel Overijssel (Dutch) Oaverysel (Twents) Oberyssel (German)
- Province
- Province of Overijssel; Provincie Overijssel (Dutch); Pervincie Oaverysel (Twents); Provinz Oberyssel (German)
- Flag Coat of arms Brandmark
- Anthem: "Aan de rand van Hollands gouwen" "On the edge of Holland's provinces"
- Location of Overijssel in the Netherlands

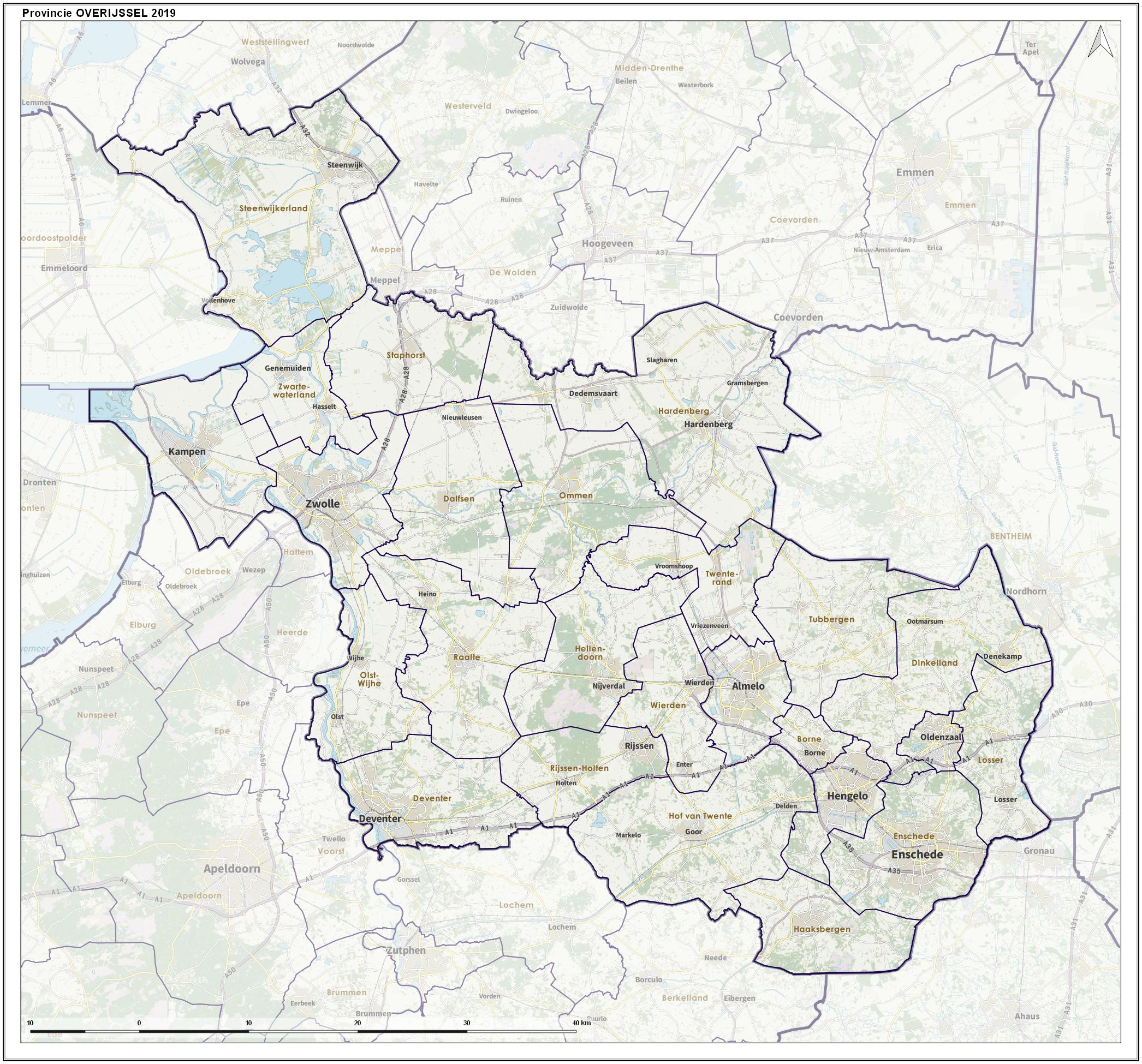
- Topography map of Overijssel
- Country: Netherlands
- Capital: Zwolle
- Largest city: Enschede

Government
  - King's Commissioner: Andries Heidema (CU)
  - Council: Provincial Council of Overijssel

Area (2023)
  - Total: 3,421 km^{2} (1,321 sq mi)
  - Land: 3,317 km^{2} (1,281 sq mi)
  - Water: 104 km^{2} (40 sq mi)
  - Rank: 5th

Population (1 January 2023)
  - Total: 1,184,333
  - Rank: 6th
  - Density: 357/km^{2} (920/sq mi)
  - Rank: 7th

GDP
  - Total: €64.470 billion (2024)
  - Per capita: €53,950 (2024)
- ISO 3166 code: NL-OV
- Religion (2006): Protestant 29% Catholic 26% Muslim 2% Others 6% Non-religious 37%
- HDI (2021): 0.927 very high · 7th
- Website: www.overijssel.nl

Overijssel (Dutch pronunciation: [ˌoːvərˈɛisəl]; Dutch Low Saxon: Oaveriessel [ˌɒːvərˈiːsl̩]; German: Oberyssel; lit. 'Across IJssel') is a province of the Netherlands located in the eastern part of the country. The province borders Drenthe to the north, Friesland to the north-west, Flevoland (and a small part of the IJsselmeer) to the west, Gelderland to the south and west, and Germany's states of Lower Saxony and North Rhine-Westphalia to the east. Overijssel had a population of about 1,184,000 as of January 2023.

The province's name comes from the perspective of the Episcopal principality of Utrecht, which held the territory until 1528. The capital city of Overijssel is Zwolle (pop. 132,441) and the largest city is Enschede (pop. 161,235). The land mostly consists of grasslands and some forests (including Sallandse Heuvelrug National Park).

== History ==
Map of the Bishopric of Utrecht around 1350, when present-day Overijssel was part of the region Oversticht

=== Oversticht ===
Overijssel was formerly known as Oversticht and also included most of the modern-day province of Drenthe. In 1336, it was made part of Guelders, though it was ceded to the Bishopric of Utrecht in 1347. The Bishops ceded the Oversticht to the Emperor Charles V in 1528, who styled himself Lord of Overijssel, after the Latin name of Oversticht that was known since 1233: Transysla or Transisalania, or Over-IJssel, i.e. the other side of the river IJssel. The people joined with the other Dutch and rebelled against Charles' heir Philip II. Overijssel became governed by the most powerful mayors and lords in the province, including by the lieutenant-governor Nicolaas Schmelzing (1561–1629).

After a brief occupation by the forces of the Bishop of Münster (1672–74), Overijssel received a new form of government which granted the stadtholders more power. Widespread resistance against the increased power throughout the provinces eventually led to the formation of the Batavian Republic in 1795. A centralist government arose and the Netherlands was organised into a series of départements, based on those used by revolutionary France.

=== Overijssel ===
At first organised into its own département, it was merged with Drenthe in 1798 to form Ouden IJssel, which was renamed Overijssel in 1801.

The French annexed the Batavian Republic in 1810, and Overijssel was organised into the new French département of Bouches-de-l'Yssel. After the defeat of Napoleon in 1814, the kingdom of the Netherlands and the former province of Overijssel were recreated.

Overijssel was occupied by Nazi Germany during World War II from May 1940 until its liberation in April 1945. The Noordoostpolder, a reclaimed territory which had been laid dry in 1942, was part of Overijssel from 1962 until 1986, when it became part of the newly created province of Flevoland.

== Geography ==
Overijssel is bordered by Germany (Lower Saxony and North Rhine-Westphalia) to the east, the Achterhoek region of Gelderland to the south, the Veluwe region of Gelderland and Flevoland to the west, and Friesland and the former moors of Drenthe to the north. Overijssel comprises three regions: Kop van Overijssel in the northwest, Salland in the centre of the province, and Twente in the east. Besides the capital Zwolle, other major cities are Almelo, Deventer, Hengelo, Enschede, and Kampen.

To the southeast, the province's surface is mostly sandy, interspersed with small rivers such as the Regge and Dinkel and other brooks. In the northwest, the geology is dominated by sediments from the Overijsselse Vecht and clay. The northern parts were once covered by veen (bogs) which separated the dryer and more arable south from Drenthe and which have been exploited as fuel to a large degree. Only small patches survive today (Engbertsdijksvenen near Geesteren, Witteveen (near Haaksbergen), and the Aamsveen (near Enschede). The extreme northwest is dominated by a system of lakes formed by former peat-mining and protected under the Weerribben-Wieden National Park status, which is a valuable wetland.

The highest point in Overijssel is the summit of the Tankenberg, a hill in the municipality of Losser, at 85 metres (278 ft). The lowest point is in the Mastenbroek Polder near Kampen at 2 metres (6 ft) below sea level.

Important rivers : IJssel, Zwarte Water, Overijsselse Vecht, Dinkel, Regge and Reest.

Major channels : Twentekanaal (Enschede and Zutphen-branch to Almelo), Overijssels Kanaal, Kanaal Almelo-De Haandrik, Kanaal Almelo-Nordhorn (outdoors) and Dedemsvaart (largely muted).

=== Climate ===
Overijssel enjoys an oceanic climate (Cfb in the Köppen classification). However, winters tend to be more severe than the rest of the Netherlands, because of its distance from the coast.

Climate data for Twenthe (1981–2010)
Month	Jan	Feb	Mar	Apr	May	Jun	Jul	Aug	Sep	Oct	Nov	Dec	Year
Mean daily maximum °C (°F)	4.8 (40.6)	5.7 (42.3)	9.5 (49.1)	13.9 (57.0)	18.0 (64.4)	20.5 (68.9)	22.8 (73.0)	22.5 (72.5)	18.7 (65.7)	14.1 (57.4)	8.9 (48.0)	5.2 (41.4)	13.7 (56.7)
Daily mean °C (°F)	2.3 (36.1)	2.6 (36.7)	5.6 (42.1)	8.9 (48.0)	12.9 (55.2)	15.4 (59.7)	17.6 (63.7)	17.1 (62.8)	14.0 (57.2)	10.2 (50.4)	6.0 (42.8)	2.9 (37.2)	9.6 (49.3)
Mean daily minimum °C (°F)	−0.5 (31.1)	−0.6 (30.9)	1.5 (34.7)	3.4 (38.1)	7.1 (44.8)	9.6 (49.3)	12.0 (53.6)	11.5 (52.7)	9.2 (48.6)	6.2 (43.2)	3.0 (37.4)	0.3 (32.5)	5.2 (41.4)
Average precipitation mm (inches)	71.5 (2.81)	51.6 (2.03)	65.1 (2.56)	45.2 (1.78)	62.4 (2.46)	67.7 (2.67)	74.5 (2.93)	71.0 (2.80)	65.4 (2.57)	67.5 (2.66)	68.9 (2.71)	74.1 (2.92)	784.9 (30.90)
Mean monthly sunshine hours	52.8	82.6	114.0	169.9	202.1	184.6	202.4	184.4	137.4	112.3	58.9	46.0	1,547.3
Source: KNMI

== Politics ==
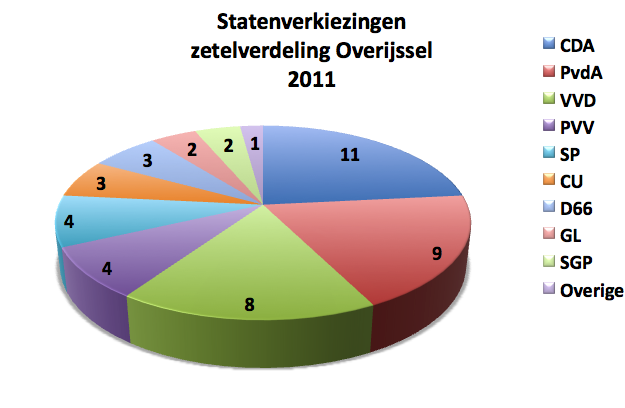
Diagram of the 2011 election results for the States-Provincial in Overijssel

The King's Commissioner of Overijssel is Andries Heidema (CU) since 11 July 2018. The King's Commissioner is the chairman of the Provincial-Executive (executive branch) and the States-Provincial (elected legislature) of the province.

The Provincial Council, the general government of the province, consists of 47 members who are elected every four years. Until the States elections of March 2007, Overijssel had 63 Members of Parliament. An amendment to the Provinces Act resulted in the total number of States members in the Netherlands being reduced from 764 to the current 564.

2023 election results
Political party	Votes in %	Seats
Farmer-Citizen Movement	31.45	17
Christian Democratic Appeal	8.20	4
People's Party for Freedom and Democracy	7.96	4
GroenLinks	7.41	4
Labour Party	6.70	3
Christian Union	5.89	3
Party for Freedom	4.88	2
Reformed Political Party	3.66	2
Democrats 66	3.60	2
JA21	3.56	2
Party for the Animals	3.55	1
Socialist Party	2.98	1
Volt Netherlands	2.98	1
Forum for Democracy	2.72	1
Other parties	4.46	0
Total		47

== Religion ==
Religion in Overijssel (2015)
1. Not religious (42.2%)
2. Protestant Christianity (26.1%)
3. Roman Catholicism (23.3%)
4. Other (5.60%)
5. Islam (2.90%)

In 2015, 26.1% of the population were Protestant, while 23.3% were Roman Catholic, 2.9% were Muslim, and 5.6% adhered to other faiths. Over two-fifths of the population (42.2%) identified as non-religious. In 2010-2013 Overijssel had the highest rate of people as a provincial proportion in the Netherlands who regularly visit a place of worship (although not the highest rate of religious affiliation which was in Limburg). The province has many orthodox Calvinist communities (most strongly in Staphorst) adhering to the Dutch Reformed Church (Hervormde) or Reformed (Gereformeerde), mainly in the western part that forms part of the Bible Belt. Overijssel also has regular Protestant Church communities and also has some of the highest concentration of Catholic adherents outside the south of the Netherlands in several municipalities in the east and south of the province.

Christian denominations in Overijssel (2015)(as % of local population)
Municipality	Protestant				Roman Catholic
Municipality	Protestant Church (PKN)	Dutch Reformed (NHK)	Reformed Churches	Total	Roman Catholic
Almelo	5.5	8.1	1.7	15.3	21.4
Borne	5.3	4.8	0.9	11.0	36.9
Dalfsen	10.0	24.0	11.5	45.5	19.7
Deventer	3.1	7.0	1.5	11.6	14.8
Dinkelland	1.4	2.5	0.0	3.9	76.9
Enschede	3.0	4.9	4.1	12.0	17.8
Haaksbergen	1.2	8.4	0.3	9.9	52.7
Hardenberg	19.9	18.4	18.7	57.0	8.3
Hellendoorn	17.4	21.0	4.6	43.0	25.1
Hengelo	3.5	5.2	1.5	10.2	25.4
Hof van Twente	3.1	16.6	0.9	20.6	33.8
Kampen	15.9	18.3	18.0	52.2	6.7
Losser	5.5	3.2	0.5	9.2	54.2
Oldenzaal	1.3	3.8	0.8	5.9	53.7
Olst-Wijhe	10.8	12.4	2.7	25.9	28.7
Ommen	18.3	16.6	21.4	56.3	10.6
Raalte	3.7	8.4	1.1	13.2	60.0
Rijssen-Holten	16.0	29.1	20.3	65.4	5.3
Staphorst	9.4	47.0	12.9	69.3	0.7
Steenwijkerland	8.0	12.9	8.0	28.9	12.2
Tubbergen	2.1	2.6	0.8	5.5	77.9
Twenterand	8.2	38.1	12.2	58.5	6.1
Wierden	10.1	19.5	9.0	38.6	32.8
Zwartewaterland	14.5	28.2	18.8	61.5	3.0
Zwolle	7.7	8.7	8.9	25.3	13.8

== Economy ==
The Gross domestic product (GDP) of the region was 43.2 billion € in 2018, accounting for 5.6% of the Netherlands economic output. GDP per capita adjusted for purchasing power was 32,700 € or 108% of the EU27 average in the same year.

The province has become highly industrialized. The Twente district in the southeast, where cotton spinning, weaving, and bleaching came into prominence in the 19th century, is one of the principal centres of the Dutch textile industry. The main centres are Enschede, Almelo, Hengelo, and Oldenzaal. Other important industrial centres are Deventer, Kampen, and Zwolle.

== Transport ==
=== Cycling ===
Bicycling is common and integrated into Overijssel's everyday transportation network.

=== Road ===
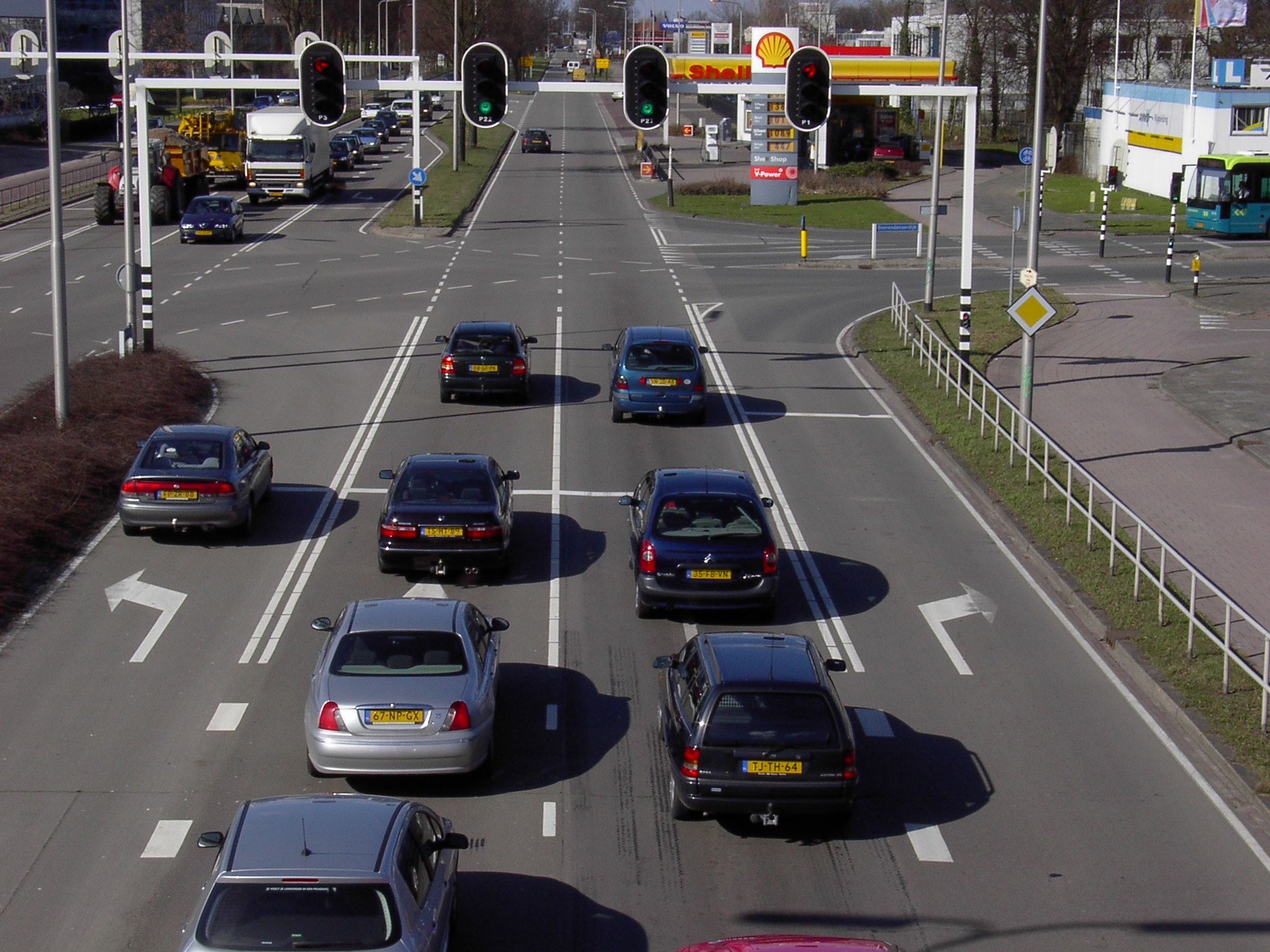
Rijksweg N35 Ceintuurbaan in Zwolle

Overijssel is an important transit province to and from Germany and the northeast of the Netherlands. There are three main motorways in Overijssel, the A1, A28, and the A35/N35. Other major trunk roads are the N18, A32, N36, N48 and N50. In addition, the province manages a large number of provincial roads of major and minor importance.

- The A1 enters the province at Deventer and runs via Hengelo and Oldenzaal to the German border, where it connects to the German A30. The A1 is an important hinterland connection with a lot of freight traffic. The road will be widened to 2x4 lanes between Knooppunt Beekbergen and Deventer and to 2x3 lanes between Deventer and Knooppunt Azelo.
- The N18 forms a connection between Enschede and the Achterhoek. The road was newly opened in 2018 between Enschede and Groenlo as a motorway.
- The A28 runs for approximately 20 kilometers in the province, but is the busiest road in Overijssel, with 130,000 vehicles crossing the IJsselbrug every day. The A28 was very sensitive to congestion, but in 2010/2011 the A28 was widened from 2x2 to 2x3 lanes from the Hattemerbroek junction to the Lankhorst junction (excluding the route through Zwolle).
- The A32 runs from Meppel to Leeuwarden, but this highway runs partly through the Kop van Overijssel along Steenwijk, among others. The A32 joins the A28 at Staphorst. The A32 is therefore an important arterial road for the northwest of the province.
- The N35 is the most important transport axis through Midden-Overijssel. The road runs from the A28 in Zwolle via Raalte and Nijverdal to Wierden, where the road turns into the A35 past Almelo and Hengelo to Enschede. From Enschede the road turns back into the N35 to the German border. The N35 is the most important connection between the cities of Twente and the Ruhr area and Münster.
- The N36 between Almelo and Ommen and the N48 between Ommen and Hoogeveen together form a connection between Twente and Groningen and between Zwolle and Hardenberg. Both roads are two-lane highways.
- The N50 is an important connection from Zwolle to Kampen and further to Flevoland and Friesland.

=== Rail network ===
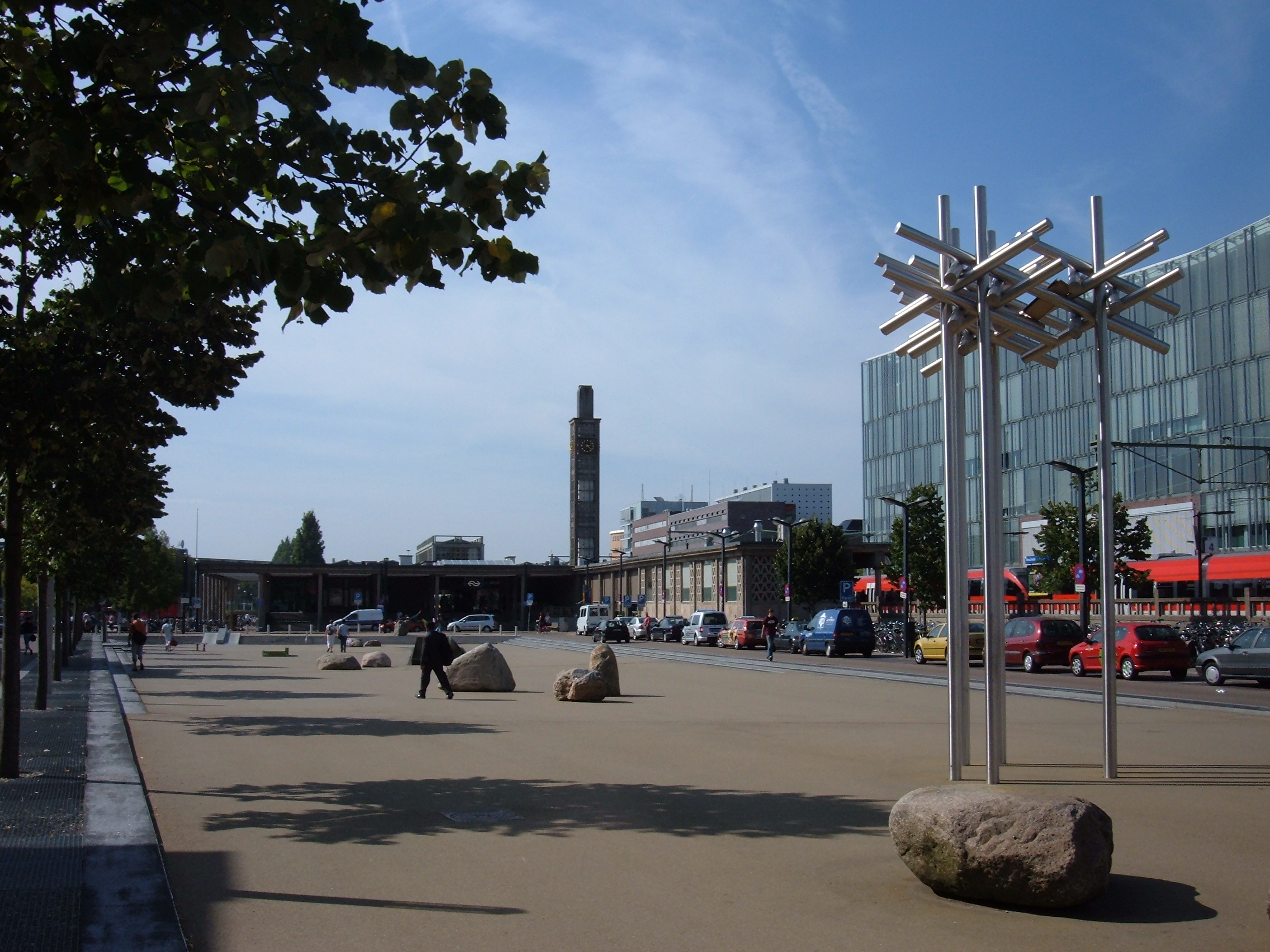
The Enschede railway station.

Four intercity connections (Enschede-Randstad, Zwolle – Roosendaal and Groningen/Leeuwarden-Amersfoort-Randstad and Groningen/Leeuwarden-Lelystad-Randstad) run through Overijssel. Zwolle railway station has a junction function. The stations of Almelo, Deventer and Hengelo have a transfer function. The stations of Hengelo, Enschede and Oldenzaal have a direct connection with Germany. The international intercity to Berlin stops in Deventer, Almelo and Hengelo. Goods traffic takes place on many lines to Germany and the north of the Netherlands.

The following railway lines are located in Overijssel:

- Utrecht – Kampen railway : (Utrecht -) Zwolle – Kampen
- Arnhem – Leeuwarden railway : (Arnhem -) Deventer – Zwolle – Steenwijk (- Leeuwarden)
- Zutphen – Glanerbeek railway : (Zutphen -) Goor – Hengelo – Enschede (- Gronau (D))
- Lelystad – Zwolle railway : (Lelystad -) Kampen South – Zwolle
- Zwolle – Stadskanaal railway : Zwolle – Hardenberg (- Emmen)
- Zwolle – Almelo railway : Zwolle – Wierden – Almelo
- Mariënberg – Almelo railway : Mariënberg – Almelo
- Almelo – Salzbergen railway : Almelo – Hengelo – Oldenzaal (- Salzbergen (D))
- Apeldoorn – Deventer railway : (Apeldoorn -) Deventer

=== Airport ===
The main airport in Overijssel is the Enschede Airport Twente, located outside of Enschede. The airport does not currently offer any international flights, though it has historically.

=== Waterways ===
Due to its location on the IJssel, Overijssel has a number of large bridges. The most important is the IJsselbrug near Zwolle, but the IJsselbrug near Deventer is also important. These are also the busiest roads in the province. At Kampen the N50 crosses the IJssel. Kampen also has two bridges over the IJssel. Other bridges over the IJssel are at Zwolle the Oude IJsselbrug and the railway bridge over the IJssel, and at Deventer a railway and road bridge. In addition to these bridges, the river IJssel can also be crossed at a number of places by means of a number of ferries.

== Municipalities ==
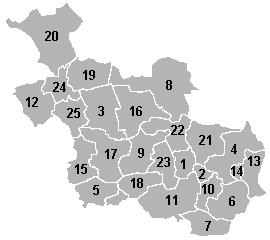
The municipalities of Overijssel

Overijssel is divided into 25 municipalities. Until 1 January 2001, there were still 44, but after a municipal reclassification came into effect, the number fell to 26. On 1 January 2005, the municipalities of Deventer and Bathmen were merged (under the name Deventer), reducing the number of municipalities into 25.

- North Overijssel COROP group
  - Dalfsen (3)
  - Hardenberg (8)
  - Kampen (12)
  - Ommen (16)
  - Staphorst (19)
  - Steenwijkerland (20)
  - Zwartewaterland (24)
  - Zwolle (25)
- South West Overijssel COROP group
  - Deventer (5)
  - Olst-Wijhe (15)
  - Raalte (17)
- Twente COROP group
  - Almelo (1)
  - Borne (2)
  - Dinkelland (4)
  - Enschede (6)
  - Haaksbergen (7)
  - Hellendoorn (9)
  - Hengelo (10)
  - Hof van Twente (11)
  - Losser (13)
  - Oldenzaal (14)
  - Rijssen-Holten (18)
  - Tubbergen (21)
  - Twenterand (22)
  - Wierden (23)

== Photo gallery ==
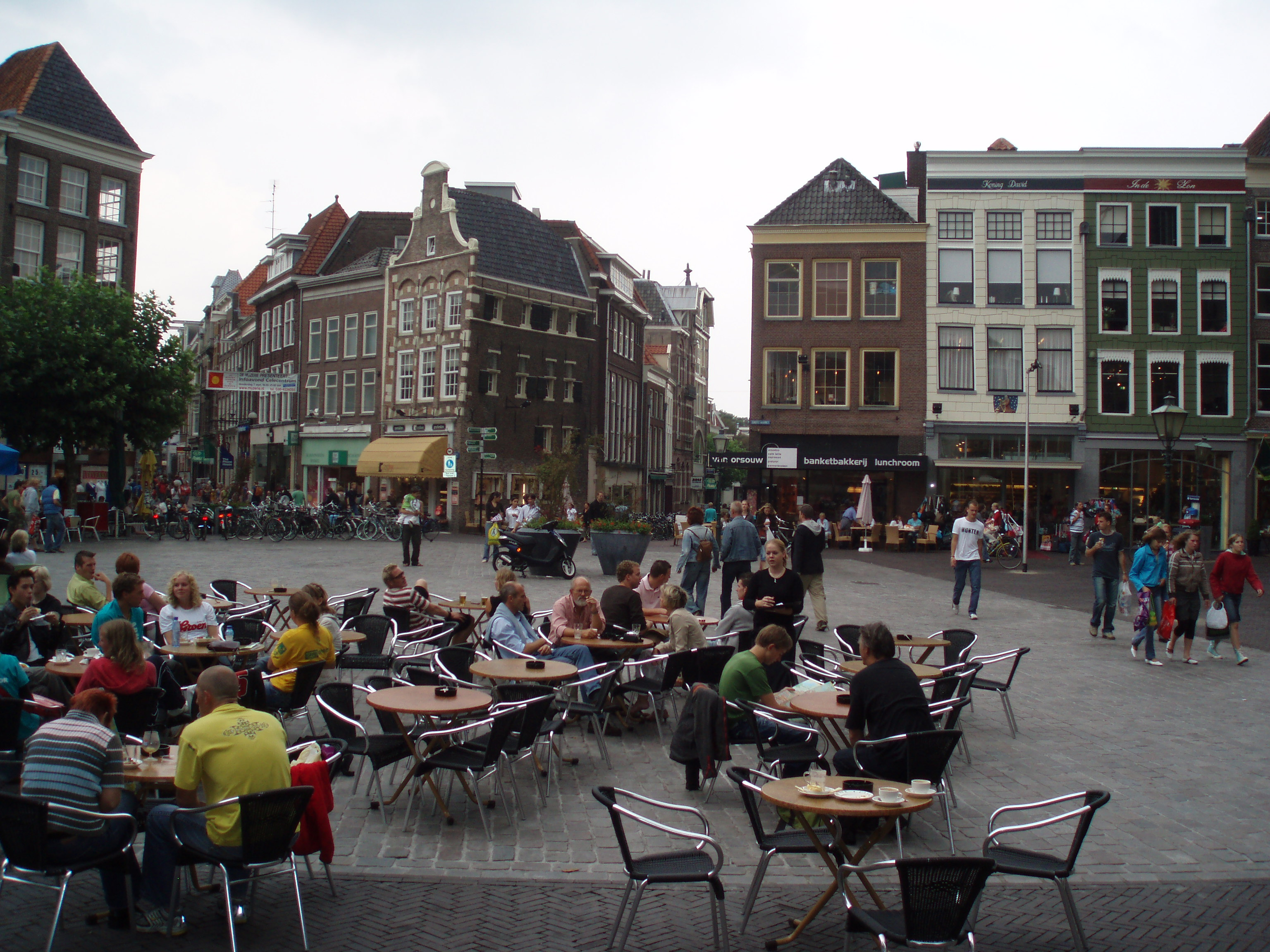
The Grote Markt in Zwolle, the provincial capital

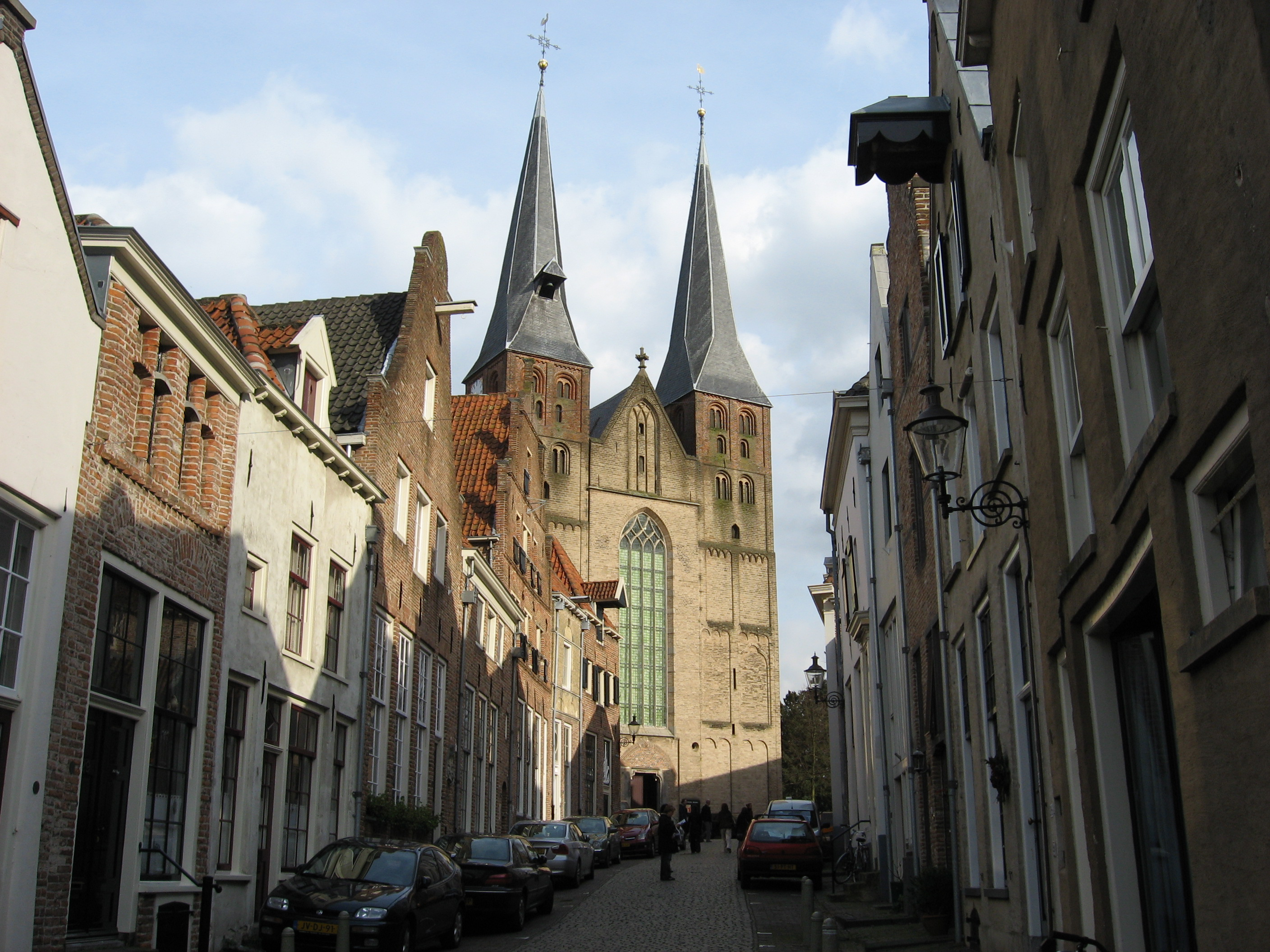
The Bergkerk from the Bergstraat, Deventer

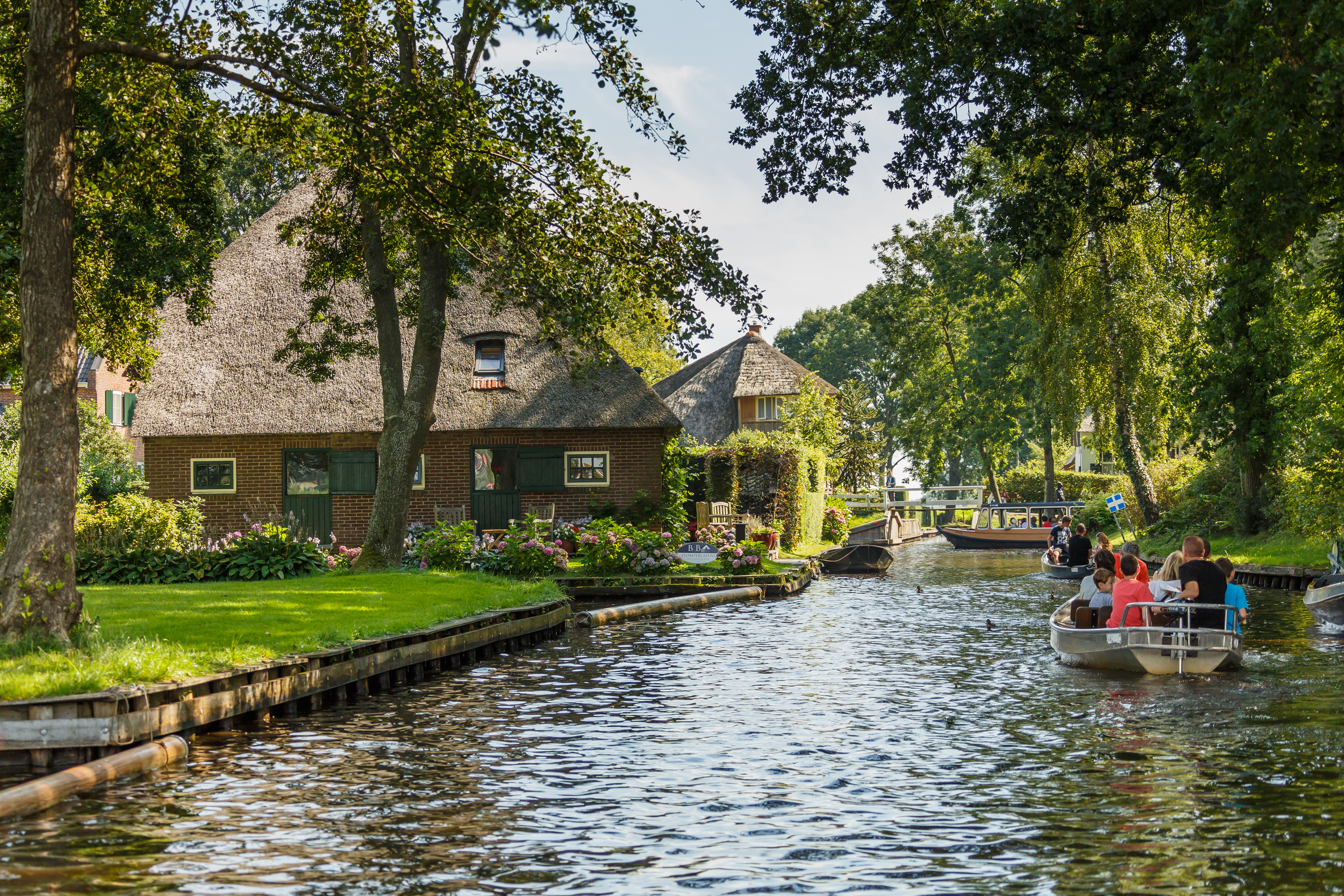
A canal in Giethoorn

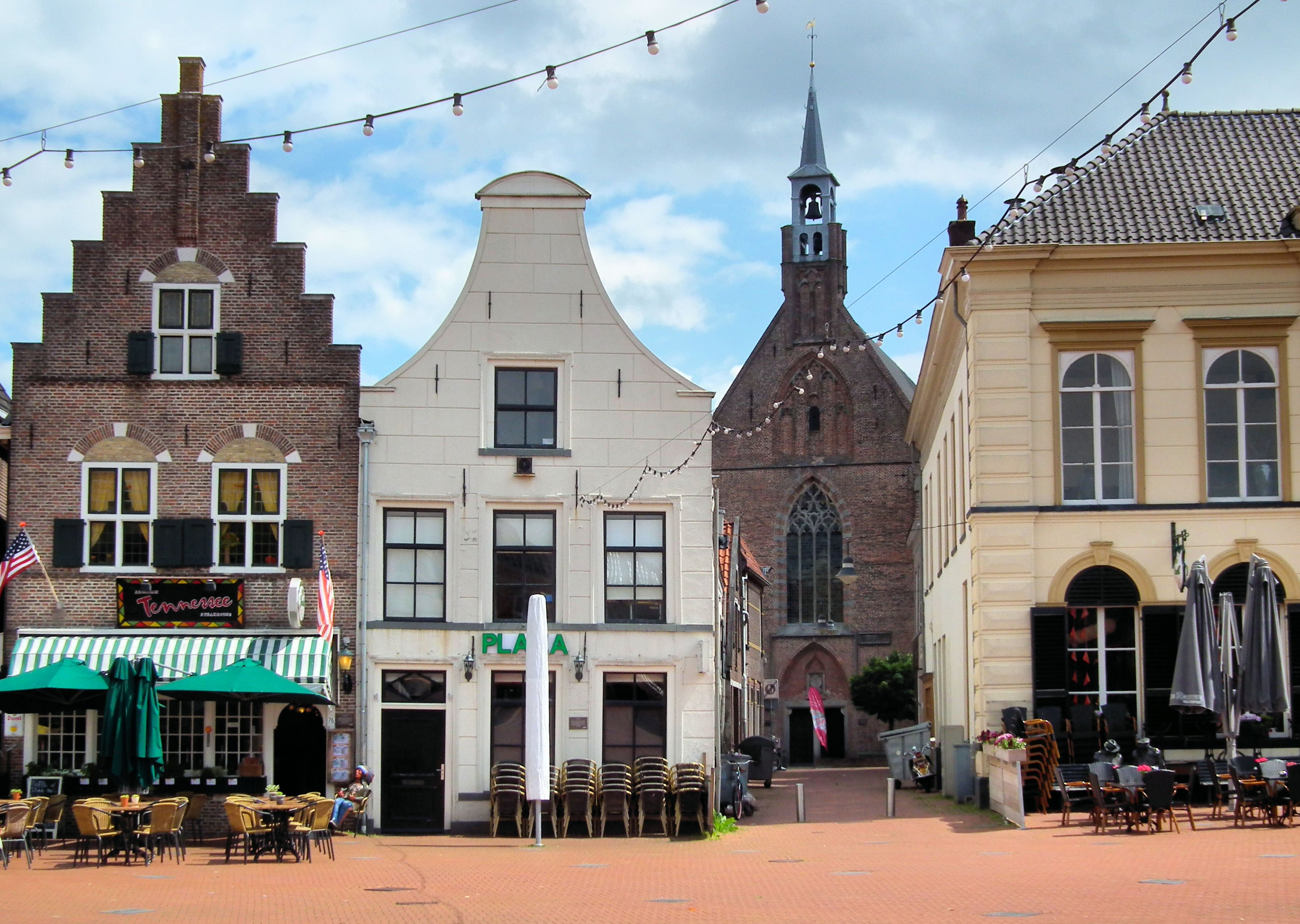
Steenwijk

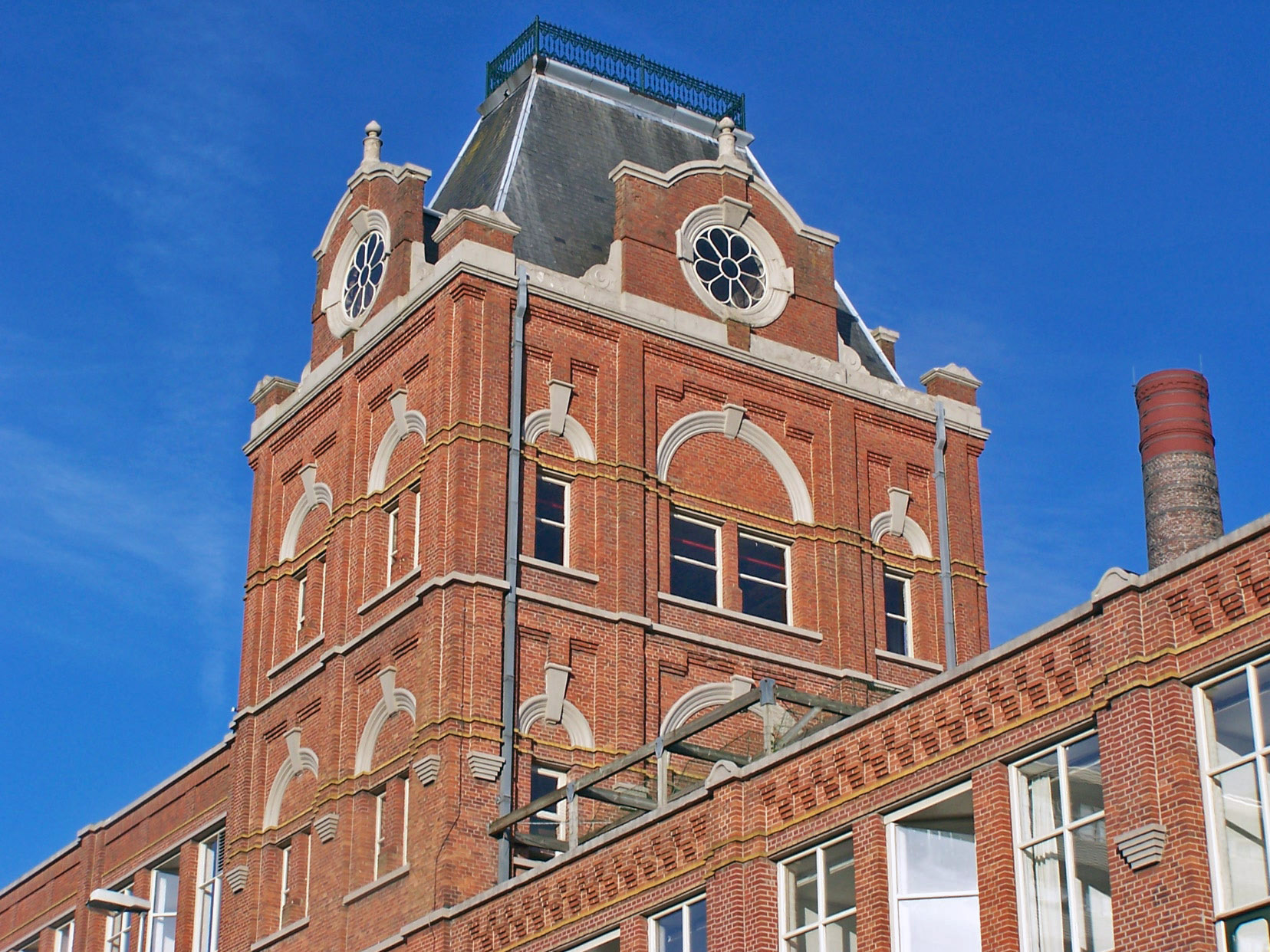
Water tower at the Jannink building in Enschede

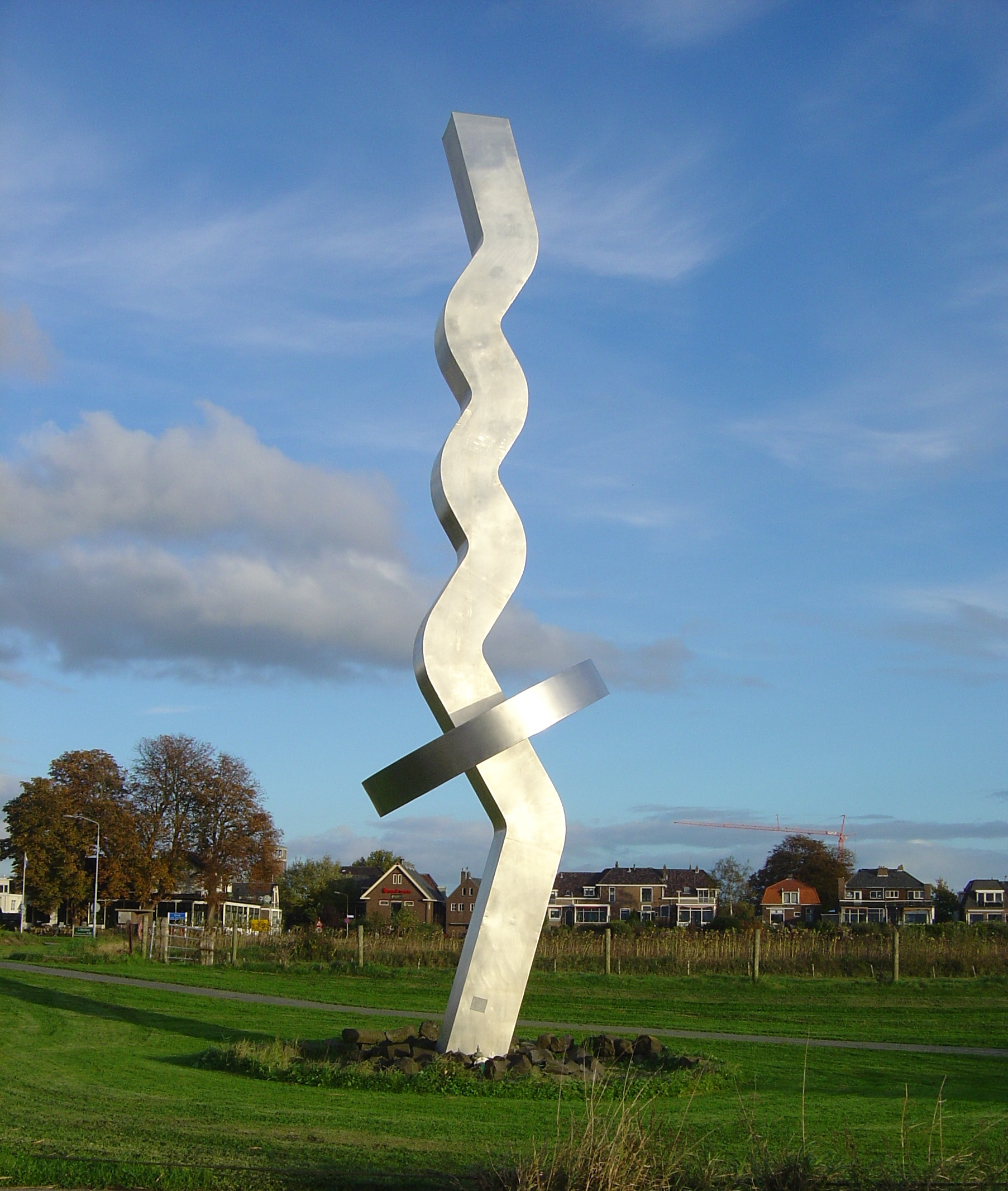
Beacon of Overijssel in Olst

== See also ==
- Overisel Township, Michigan, US was named after Overijssel
- Tanfana
