= Vechte =

River in Germany and the Netherlands

Vechte Vecht
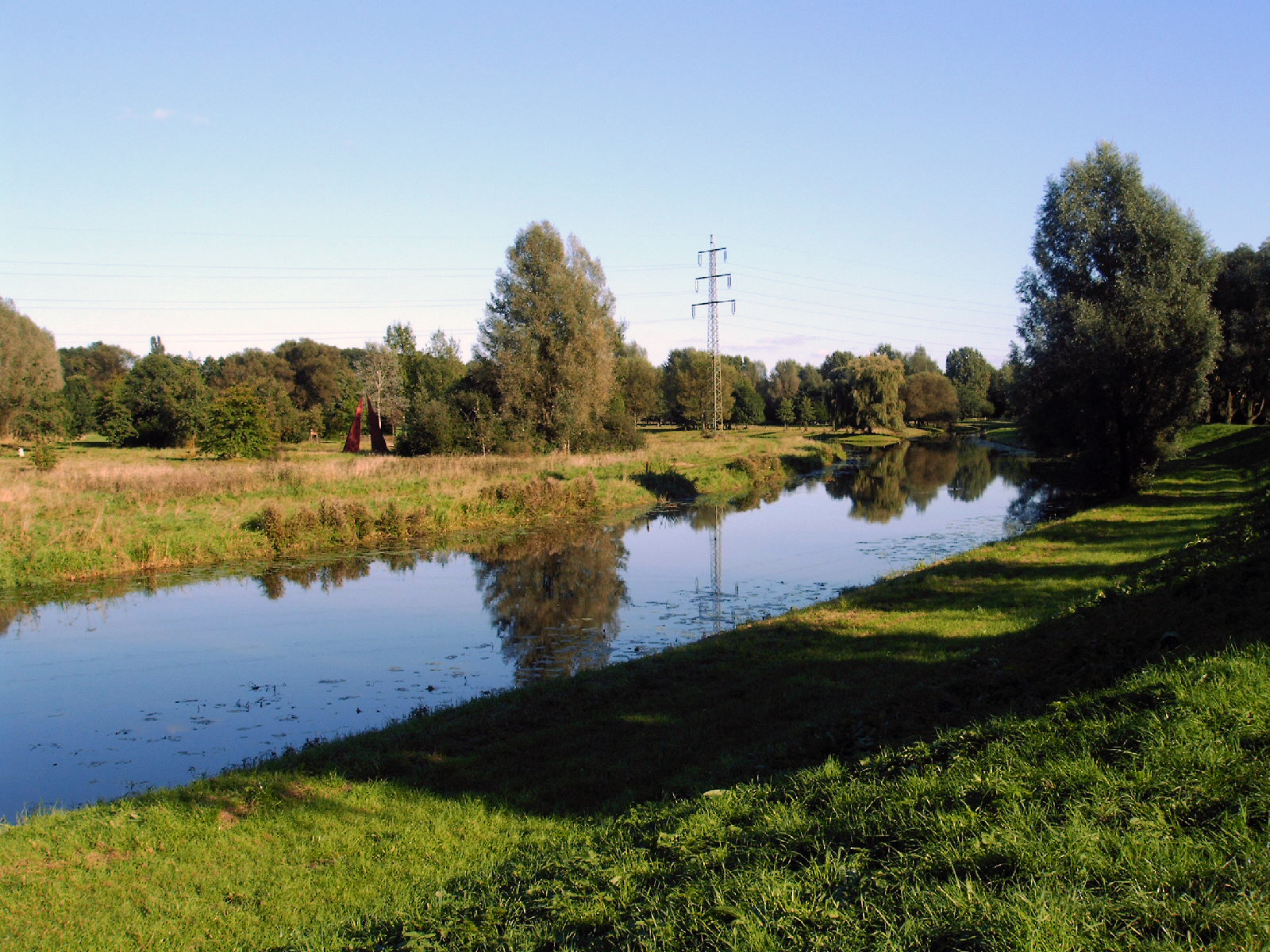
- The Vechte near Schüttorf, Germany

Location
- Countries: Germany; Netherlands

Physical characteristics
- Source
  - location: at the foot of the Bertmaring Farm, Oberdarfeld, Westphalia
  - elevation: 110 m (360 ft)
- Mouth
  - location: Zwarte Water
  - coordinates: 52°33′44″N 6°6′4″E
- Length: 181.7 km (112.9 mi)
- Basin size: 5,740 km^{2} (2,220 sq mi)

Basin features
- Progression: Zwarte Water→ IJsselmeer

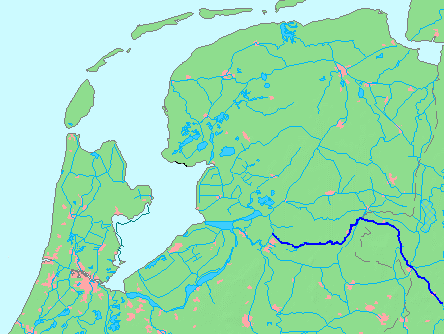
Route of the Vechte

The Vechte (German: [ˈfɛçtə], Dutch Low Saxon: [ˈv̥ɛxtə]) or Vecht (Dutch: [vɛxt]), often called Overijsselse Vecht (pronounced [oːvərˈɛisəlsə ˈvɛxt]) in the Netherlands to avoid confusion with its Utrecht counterpart, is a river in Germany and the Netherlands. Its total length is 182 km (113 mi), of which 107 km (66 mi) is in Germany.

The Vechte originates in Oberdarfeld in the German state of North Rhine-Westphalia near the city of Coesfeld and flows north into the state of Lower Saxony, past the towns of Nordhorn, Neuenhaus where it merges with the Dinkel, and Emlichheim, across the border and then westwards into the Dutch province of Overijssel (hence its alternate Dutch designation). There, it flows through the north part of the Salland region past Hardenberg and Ommen, taking in the water of the Regge stream along the way.

Close to the city of Zwolle, the river suddenly bends north to end in confluence with the Zwarte Water river near the town of Hasselt.

The Vechte is probably the Vidrus mentioned by Ptolemy in his map of Magna Germania.

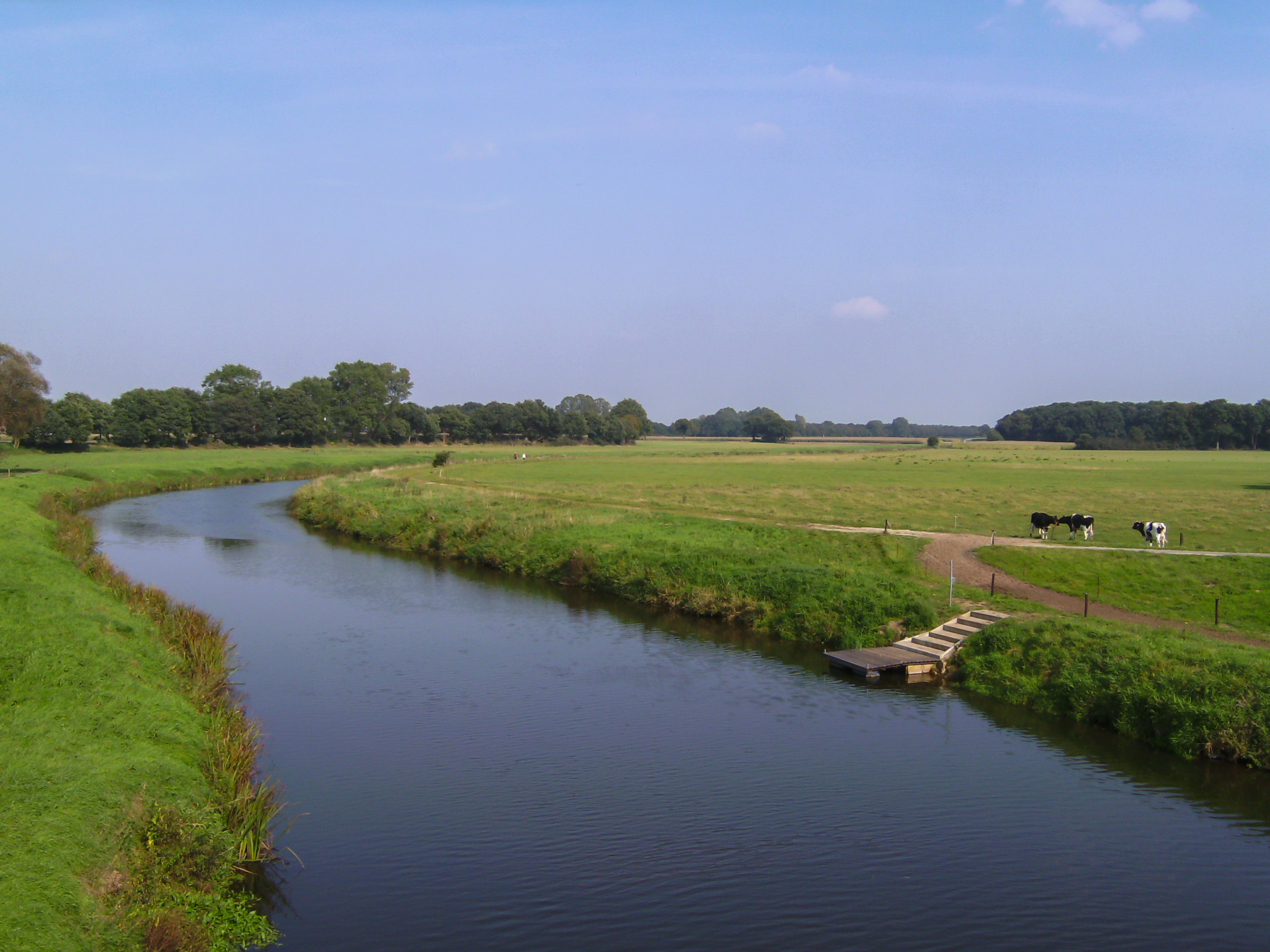
The Vechte near Emlichheim

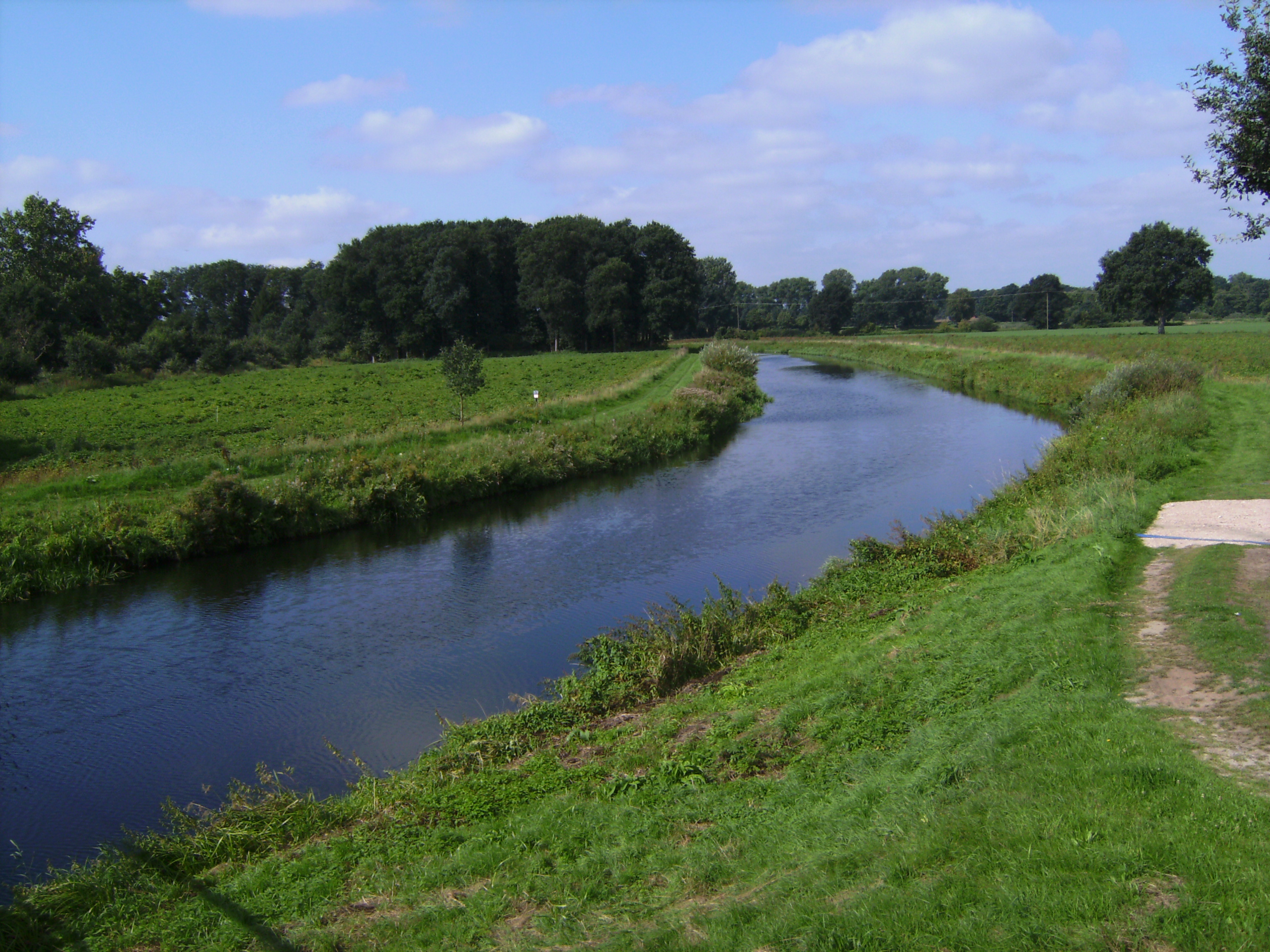
The Vechte near Neuenhaus

== See also ==
- List of rivers of the Netherlands
- List of rivers of Lower Saxony
- List of rivers of North Rhine-Westphalia
