= Zwarte Water =

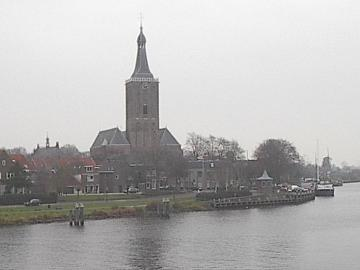
- The Zwarte Water through Hasselt

Location
- Country: Netherlands

Physical characteristics
- Source
  - location: Zwolle
- Mouth
  - location: IJsselmeer
  - coordinates: 52°38′18″N 6°0′45″E

The Zwarte Water ("Black Water") is a river in the Dutch province of Overijssel. It is formed just south of the city of Zwolle when two streams, the Soestwetering and the Nieuwe Wetering, merge. The Zwarte Water then flows north through Zwolle, bends to the northeast, takes in the Vecht near Hasselt and flows past the town of Zwartsluis to discharge in the Zwarte Meer ("Black Lake", connected to the IJsselmeer lake) near Genemuiden.

Contrary to popular belief, the Zwarte Water is not an IJssel branch, nor is it another name for the Vecht. The river is, however, connected to the IJssel by two canals, the Willemsvaart (dug in the early nineteenth century, now disused) and the Zwolle-IJssel Canal.

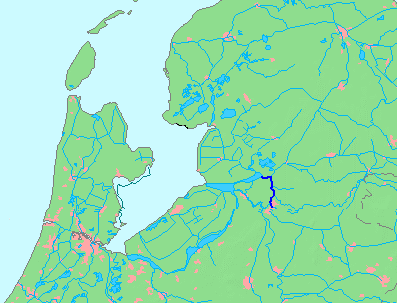
Location of the Zwarte Water river within the Netherlands.
