= N36 motorway (Netherlands) =

Road in the Netherlands

Provincial highway 36
- Provinciale weg 36
- Location of the N36 expressway

Route information
- Length: 36 km (22 mi)
- Existed: October 15, 1959–present

Major junctions
- North end: Arriërveld
- A 35 – Wierden
- South end: Wierden

Location
- Country: Kingdom of the Netherlands
- Constituent country: Netherlands
- Provinces: Overijssel

Highway system
- Roads in the Netherlands; Motorways; E-roads; Provincial; City routes

The rijksweg N36 is a Dutch expressway, managed by Rijkswaterstaat between the N48 near Arriërveld and the A35 near Wierden, and hereby is an important north–south connection route in the province of Overijssel. The part of the road between the A35 and the N34 mainly consists of grade-separated crossings. The road also consists of separated lanes around Almelo, although it only has one lane in each direction. The total length of the N36 is approximately 36 kilometers (22 miles).

== Junction and exit list ==
The entire route is in Overijssel.

Municipality	km	mi	Destinations	Notes
Ommen	0	0.0	N 48 – Arriërveld	Joins road N48 to Ommen or Hoogeveen
Hardenberg	9	5.6	N 34 – White Pole	
Ommen	14	8.7	R 103 – Mariënberg, Beerze	
Ommen	16	9.9	Beerzerveld	Only from Wierden
Twenterand	20	12	N 341 – Westerhaar	
Twenterand	26	16	N 748 – Vriezenveen	
Twenterand	27	17	Almelo-Noord	
Almelo	30	19	Vriezenveen-West	
Almelo	33	21	Wierden-Noord	
Almelo	35	22	Wierden-Oost	
Wierden	36	22	A 35 / N 35 – Wierden	Joins road A35/N35 to Zwolle or Enschede
1.000 mi = 1.609 km; 1.000 km = 0.621 mi
