= Archem =

- Hamlet
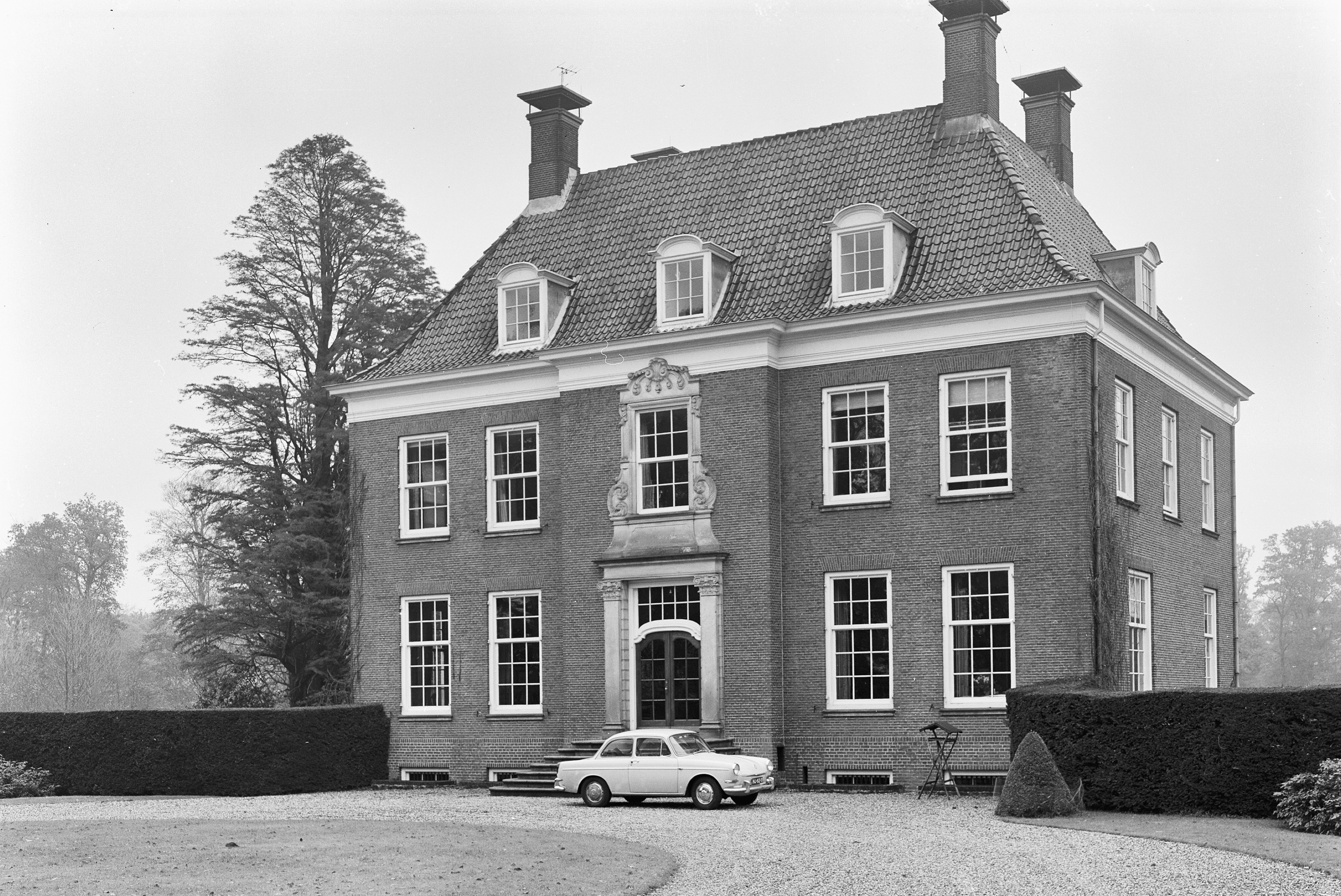
- Huis van Archem (1966)

- The village (dark red) and the statistical district (light green) of Archem in the municipality of Ommen.

- Location in the province of Overijssel in the Netherlands Archem (Netherlands)
- Coordinates: 52°28′23″N 6°26′2″E
- Country: Netherlands
- Province: Overijssel
- Municipality: Ommen

Area
  - Total: 7.19 km^{2} (2.78 sq mi)
- Elevation: 8 m (26 ft)

Population (2005)
  - Total: 85
  - Density: 12/km^{2} (31/sq mi)
- Time zone: UTC+1 (CET)
  - Summer (DST): UTC+2 (CEST)
- Postal code: 8148
- Dialing code: 0572

Archem is a hamlet in the Dutch province of Overijssel. It is a part of the municipality of Ommen, and lies about 20 km northwest of Almelo.

The administrative unit Archem comprises also Nieuwebrug, an old crossing of the Regge river.

It was first mentioned in 947 as Arachem, and means "settlement of Arho (person)" The postal authorities have placed it under Lemele. Archem developed around Huis van Archem. The current manor dates from 1925. In 1840, it was home to 208 people.
