= Ilona Lagas =

Dutch politician (born 1956)

Leader of the Farmer–Citizen Movement in the Senate
- Incumbent
- Assumed office 13 June 2023

Member of the Senate
- Incumbent
- Assumed office 13 June 2023
- Parliamentary group: Farmer–Citizen Movement

Alderwoman of Ommen
- In office 17 July 2017 – 2018 (acting) Serving with Theo Katerberg
- Preceded by: Hans ter Keurst
- In office 6 April 2006 – 27 May 2014

Personal details
- Born: Ilona Maria Meijer; 31 January 1956 (age 70) Zwolle, Netherlands
- Party: BBB (since 2021)
- Other political affiliations: VVD (until 2021)
- Spouse: Ad Lagas
- Occupation: Politician; teacher; consultant

Ilona Maria Lagas-Meijer (Dutch: [iˈloːnaː laːˌɣɑs ˈmɛiər]; born 31 January 1956) is a Dutch politician of the Farmer–Citizen Movement (BBB). She participated in the 2023 Senate election as the Farmer–Citizen Movement's lead candidate, and became the party's parliamentary leader in the Senate. Lagas joined the Farmer–Citizen Movement in 2021 after leaving the People's Party for Freedom and Democracy (VVD), for which she previously served as a municipal councillor and alderwoman.

== Biography ==
Lagas was born on 31 January 1956 in Zwolle, Overijssel. After working in a hospital laboratory for eleven years, she became a teacher in German and civics at a college for vocational education (MBO) in 1985. She later joined the management of the college's programme in international trade. Since 2014, she has been a self-employed government consultant.

=== Political career ===
A member of the VVD, Lagas was elected into the municipal council of Nieuwleusen in 1990. She was re-elected in the 1994 municipal election, but left the council in 1995 when she moved out of the municipality. From 1998, she served as a member of the municipal council of Ommen, until she joined the municipal executive on 6 April 2006. Her portfolio as an alderwoman included spatial planning, environment and economic affairs.

In 2011, Lagas survived a motion of no confidence after a municipal construction project had resulted in a loss of €28.5 million. She was re-elected into the municipal council in the 2014 election, and left the municipal executive on 27 May 2014. From 2017 to 2018, she briefly served as a part-time alderwoman while one of the municipality's aldermen was on sick leave. Lagas left local politics in 2020.

In 2021, Lagas left the VVD, as she felt that the party no longer represented the interests of the countryside. The fourth Rutte cabinet's policy to reduce agricultural nitrogen pollution by 50% before 2030 contributed to her decision to leave the party. Lagas subsequently joined the Farmer–Citizen Movement. She was elected into the Provincial Council of Overijssel in the 2023 provincial elections, but did not accept her seat due to her scheduled participation in the 2023 Senate election as the Farmer–Citizen Movement's lead candidate. After the election, she became the party's parliamentary leader in the Senate.

== Personal life ==
Lagas resides in Vinkenbuurt, Overijssel. She is married to Ad Lagas, with whom she has a son and a daughter. Her husband is the founder of a classical liberal faction within the People's Party for Freedom and Democracy. He later also defected to the Farmer–Citizen Movement. Her daughter, Marijke Lagas, is a cystic fibrosis patient, who successfully advocated for health insurance coverage of treatment with lumacaftor/ivacaftor in the Netherlands.
