= Heleen Herbert =

Dutch politician (born 1972)

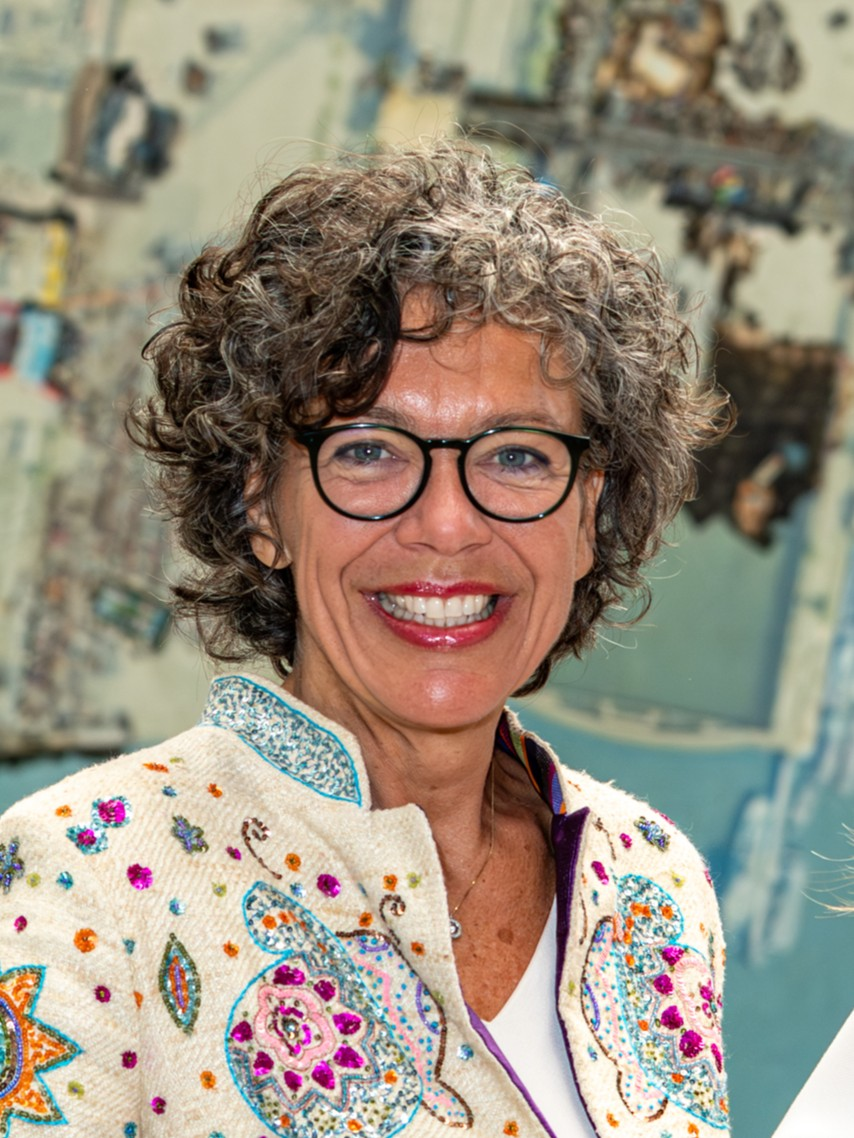
- Herbert in 2026

Minister of Economic Affairs and Climate Policy
- Incumbent
- Assumed office 23 February 2026
- Prime Minister: Rob Jetten
- Preceded by: Vincent Karremans

Personal details
- Born: 1972 (age 53–54) Beerzerveld, Netherlands
- Party: Christian Democratic Appeal
- Education: University of Twente

Heleen Herbert (born 1972) is a Dutch administrator and politician. She has been the Minister of Economic Affairs and Climate Policy on behalf of the Christian Democratic Appeal (CDA) in the Jetten cabinet since 23 February 2026. She was Director of Strategy and Chief Commercial Officer at Koninklijke Heijmans NV until early 2026.

== Business career ==
Heleen Herbert grew up in the village of Beerzerveld and attended pre-university education at the Christian School Community Jan van Arkel in Hardenberg. Between 1990 and 1995 she studied technical business administration at the University of Twente.

She worked at the Dutch Railways between 1997 and 2012, where she was co-responsible for NS Hispeed (2006–2009), in the run-up to the Fyra, and ultimately rose to become regional director for the southern three provinces in 2009.

She then worked at construction company Koninklijke Heijmans, initially at Heijmans Civiel. In 2014, she became Chief Commercial Officer at the parent company, and in 2019 she expanded her role to that of Chief Human Resource Officer , where she would also be involved in strategy and organization.

In addition to and from her main position, Herbert was also active in several other roles within the construction industry. For example, from 2021 she was chair of the Water Tower Council (2021), a strategic knowledge and network organization with construction companies and government bodies and for some time was a commissioner at the consultancy and engineering firm LBP Sight.

== Political career ==
Herbert has been active for many years at the CDA, where she is a member of various internal committees as an HRM expert.

== Personal life ==
Herbert has mentioned in interviews that she was active in a gospel choir. Between 2019 and 2022, she was a board member of Habitat Netherlands, the Dutch branch of Habitat for Humanity, which promotes housing worldwide (primarily in developing countries) through home ownership.

Since 2015 she has been active in various roles for 's-Hertogenbosch. For example, between 2015 and 2019 she was a board member of the Erasmus Festival Brabant, a director (2020) and chairperson (2024) of the Friends of the Verkadefabriek, chairperson of the supervisory board of the Theaterfestival Boulevard's-Hertoghenbosch (2021) and a member of the Advisory Committee of the Bosch Parade.
