= Giethmen =

- Hamlet
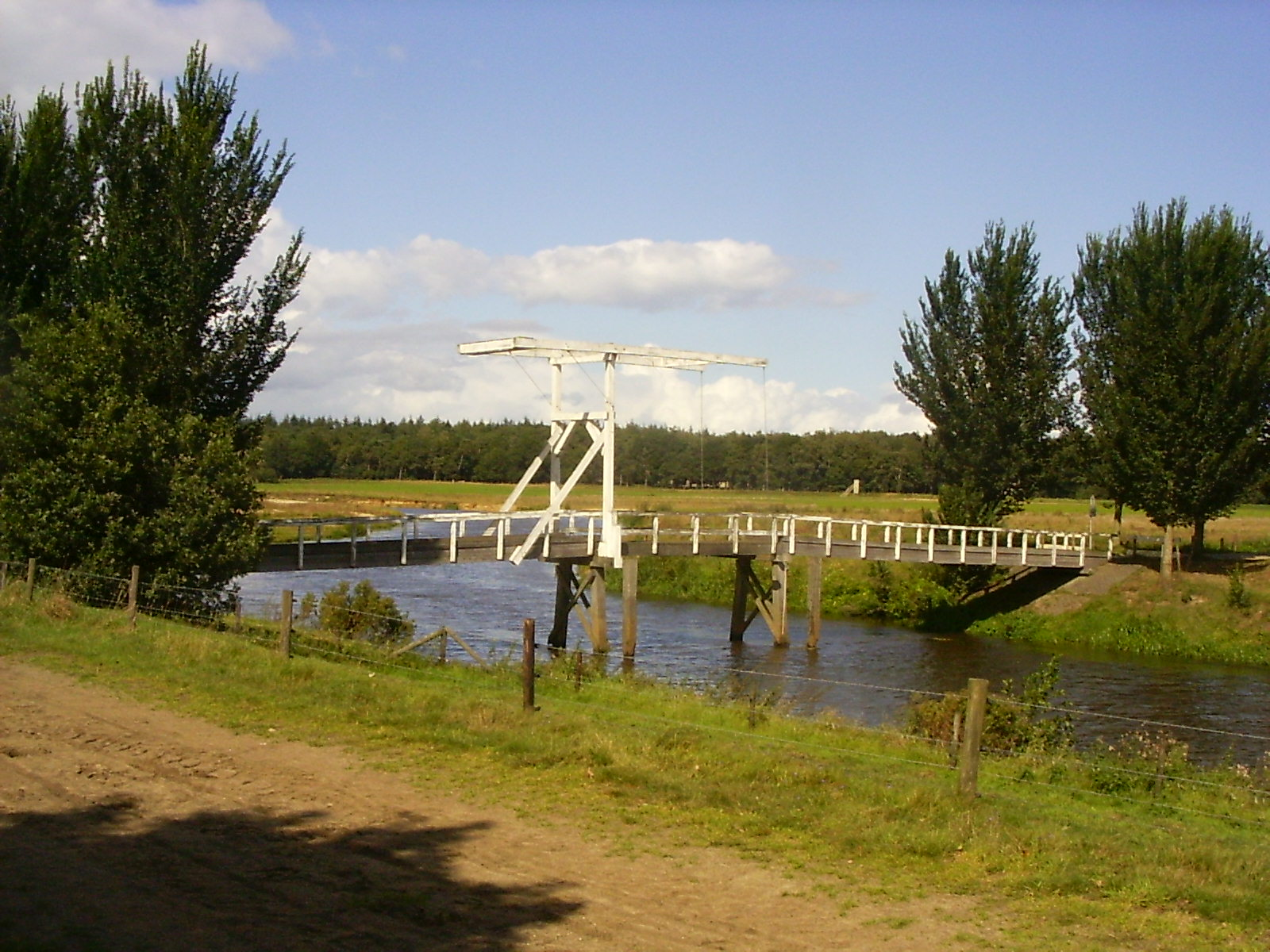
- Bridge over the Regge

- The village (dark red) and the statistical district (light green) of Giethmen in the municipality of Ommen.

- Location in the province of Overijssel in the Netherlands Giethmen (Netherlands)
- Coordinates: 52°30′N 6°24′E
- Country: Netherlands
- Province: Overijssel
- Municipality: Ommen

Area
  - Total: 7.61 km^{2} (2.94 sq mi)
- Elevation: 6 m (20 ft)

Population (2021)
  - Total: 225
  - Density: 29.6/km^{2} (76.6/sq mi)
- Time zone: UTC+1 (CET)
  - Summer (DST): UTC+2 (CEST)
- Postal code: 8147
- Dialing code: 0529

Giethmen is a hamlet in the Dutch province of Overijssel. It is a part of the municipality of Ommen, and lies about 21 km east of Zwolle.

It was first mentioned between 1381 as 1383 Gheetmen. The etymology is unclear. In 1840, it was home to 149 people.

== Giethemer Kerkpad ==
Giethmen is known for its kerkpad, or church path, an old trail which leads from Giethmen to Ommen. Because Giethmen does not have its own church, its inhabitants used to walk (and later bicycle) up and down to Ommen twice every Sunday. The trail's pedestrian bridge across the Regge, known as the Giethemerkerkbrug, has become an icon for Giethmen. Today the Giethemer Kerkpad is part of a popular hiking and bicycle trail.

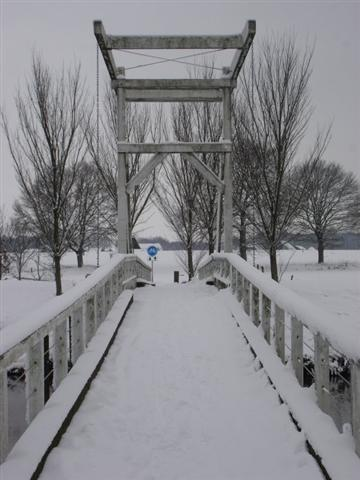
The bridge of the Giethemer Kerkpad across the Regge
