= Stad Ommen =

Coordinates: 52°32′N 6°25′E

Coat of Arms

Stad Ommen is a former municipality in the Dutch province of Overijssel. It consisted of the city of Ommen and the village of Ommerschans.

It existed from 1818 to 1923, when it merged with the municipality of Ambt Ommen, which covered the surrounding countryside.
