= Junne =

- Hamlet
- The village (dark red) and the statistical district (light green) of Junne in the municipality of Ommen.

- Location in the province of Overijssel in the Netherlands Junne (Netherlands)
- Coordinates: 52°31′19″N 6°29′28″E
- Country: Netherlands
- Province: Overijssel
- Municipality: Ommen

Area
  - Total: 11.26 km^{2} (4.35 sq mi)
- Elevation: 7 m (23 ft)

Population (2021)
  - Total: 85
  - Density: 7.5/km^{2} (20/sq mi)
- Time zone: UTC+1 (CET)
  - Summer (DST): UTC+2 (CEST)
- Postal code: 7731
- Dialing code: 0529

Junne is a hamlet in the Dutch province of Overijssel. It is a part of the municipality of Ommen, and lies about 22 km northwest of Almelo.

The Vecht river is navigable straight from Zwolle until the weir at Junne. On the banks of the Vecht are some small nature reserves, which have a unique ecosystem of river dunes and grasslands and are now managed by the National Forest Service.

== History ==
Junne is an old buurschap or semi-autonomous hamlet ruled communally by neighbouring freemen farmers. Situated at a curve in the meandering Vecht river, Junne's alluvial soil was much more fertile and arable than the surrounding bogs and moors.

However, during the Batavian Republic of the early 19th century the state apparatus became much more centralised and municipalities were introduced, causing the buurschap Junne gradually to lose much of its autonomy over the decades that followed. Its communal grounds eventually became the private property of the Lüps in 1872, until Baron Bentinck tot Buckhorst from neighbouring Beerze obtained them in 1932.

The forests of Junne and most farms are now owned by the Delta Lloyd insurance company. Delta Lloyd obtained them in 2006 from its legal predecessor, Amstleven, who had in turn bought them from Baron Bentick tot Buckhorst. Some farms and houses are still privately owned, however.

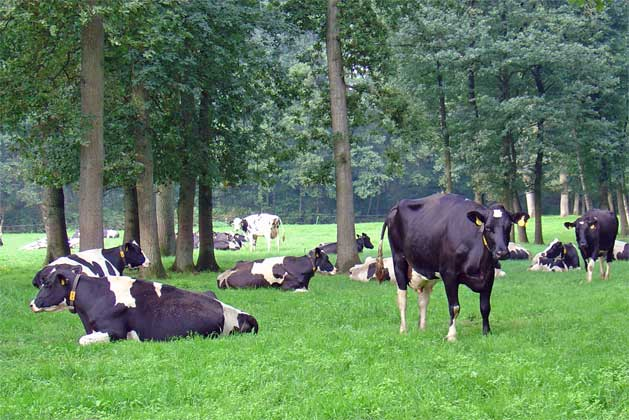
The Junne Cowlands on the bank of the Vecht
