= Bijker =

Surname list

Bijker is a surname. Notable people with the surname include:

- Eco Bijker (1924–2012), Dutch professor of Coastal Engineering
- Lucas Bijker (born 1993), Dutch footballer
- Wiebe Bijker (born 1951), Dutch professor of Social Science

== See also ==
- Bikker
