= Stegerveld =

- Hamlet
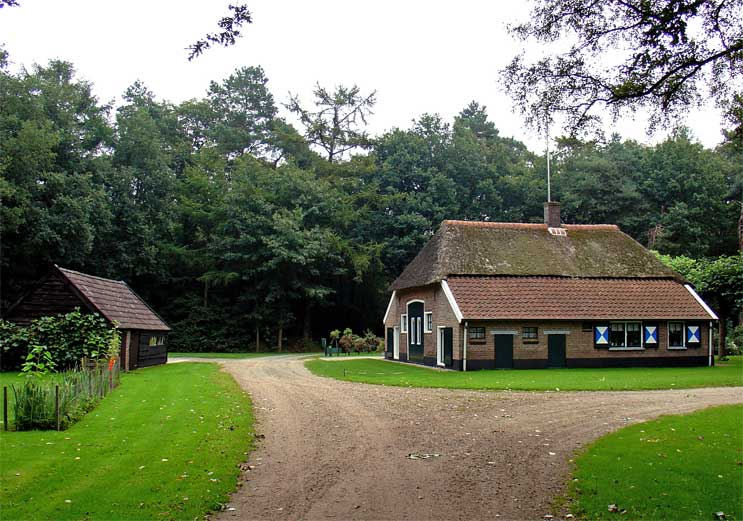
- Farm in Stegerveld

- The village (dark red) and the statistical district (light green) of Stegerveld in the municipality of Ommen.

- Location in the province of Overijssel in the Netherlands Stegerveld (Netherlands)
- Coordinates: 52°34′19″N 6°29′55″E
- Country: Netherlands
- Province: Overijssel
- Municipality: Ommen

Area
  - Total: 8.49 km^{2} (3.28 sq mi)
- Elevation: 7 m (23 ft)

Population (2021)
  - Total: 360
  - Density: 42/km^{2} (110/sq mi)
- Time zone: UTC+1 (CET)
  - Summer (DST): UTC+2 (CEST)
- Postal code: 7737
- Dialing code: 0529

Stegerveld is a hamlet in the Dutch province of Overijssel. It is a part of the municipality of Ommen, and lies about 17 km south of Hoogeveen. A part of the hamlet is located in Hardenberg.

It was first mentioned in 1867 as Stegeren Veld, and means field near Stegeren. The postal authorities have placed it under Stegeren. The Ministry of Defence used to have a munition depot in the hamlet. The end of the Cold War, and complaints of farmers who were in the safety zone, have resulted in closing of the depot in 2005. One of the bunkers was home to bats, and has remained.
