= Nieuwebrug, Overijssel =

Nieuwebrug
- Coordinates: 52°29′16″N 6°25′25″E
- Country: Netherlands
- Province: Overijssel
- Municipality: Ommen

Population (2008)
  - Total: 104
- with the hamlet of Archem

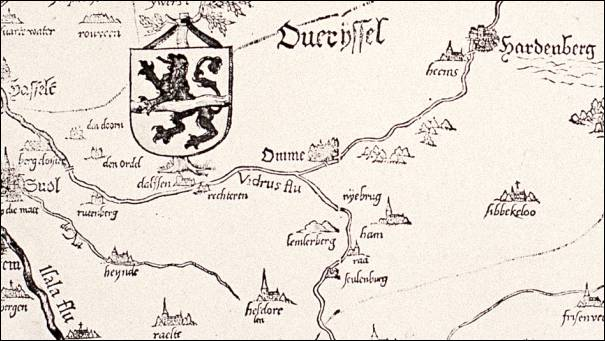
A map from 1559 showing the Nyebrug meeting place

Nieuwebrug (52°29′N 6°25′E) is a hamlet in the Dutch province of Overijssel. It is a part of the municipality of Ommen, and lies about 21 km east of Zwolle. The name Nieuwebrug (or New Bridge) refers to the bridge over the Regge on the road between Ommen and Hellendoorn. Nieuwebrug has a pub south of the Regge river and an elementary school.

For centuries during the Middle-Ages, the Estates of Overijssel – a diet or feudal parliament, representing the knighthoods of Salland, Vollenhove and Twenthe (and, until 1527, also Drenthe) and the cities of Zwolle, Deventer and Kampen – convened at the still existing pub at Nieuwebrug. Following a feud between Kampen and Zwolle in 1519, however, the Estates were attacked by citizens of Zwolle, who abducted three noblemen and pillaged the nearby Eerde castle. During the years that followed, conflict escalated in Overijssel.

In 1556, the States met again at Nieuwebrug to discuss whether to depose King Philip II.
