= Vilsteren =

- Village
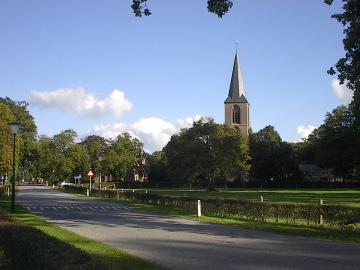
- The St. Willibrordus Church in Vilsteren

- Vilsteren in the municipality of Ommen.

- Location in the province of Overijssel in the Netherlands Vilsteren (Netherlands)
- Coordinates: 52°30′41″N 6°21′11″E
- Country: Netherlands
- Province: Overijssel
- Municipality: Ommen

Area
  - Total: 11.34 km^{2} (4.38 sq mi)
- Elevation: 7 m (23 ft)

Population (2021)
  - Total: 350
  - Density: 31/km^{2} (80/sq mi)
- Time zone: UTC+1 (CET)
  - Summer (DST): UTC+2 (CEST)
- Postal code: 7734
- Dialing code: 0529

Vilsteren is a village in the municipality of Ommen in the Dutch province of Overijssel. It is situated just off the left bank of the Vecht in between Dalfsen and Ommen, about 17 kilometres east of the provincial capital of Zwolle.

== History ==
Vilsteren is an esdorp which was first mentioned in 1233 as Hermanno de Vilsteren. In 1381, a manor house was established in the village. The current Huis Vilsteren dates from 1908. A clandestine church was built in the estate during the Reformation, and Vilsteren is one of the few villages to remain Roman Catholic in what is now the Protestant Bible Belt. The Saint Willibrord Church was completed in 1817. In 1840, it was home to 146 people.

== Gallery ==
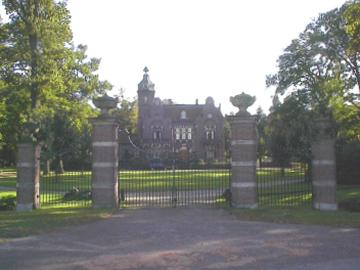
Huis Vilsteren

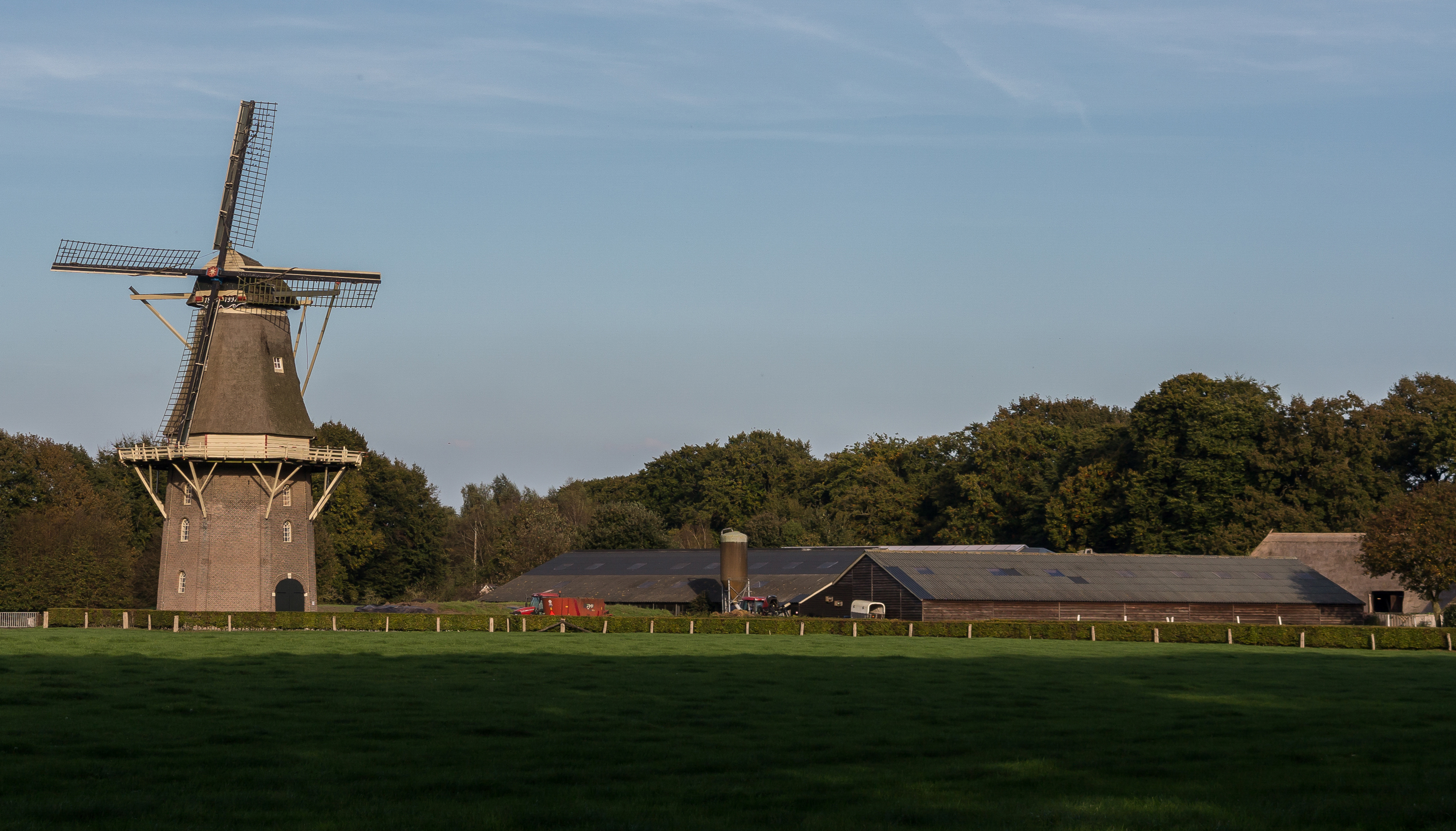
Windmill (de Vilsterse molen)
