= Salland =

Area of the Netherlands

- Region of Overijssel
- Flag

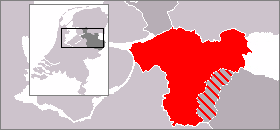
- The location of the historical dominion Salland (red and red-grey) within Overijssel (dark grey) and the Netherlands (light grey); the red-grey area belongs to the city region of Twente.
- Country: Netherlands

Area
  - Total: 1,595.37 km^{2} (615.98 sq mi)

Population (2019)
  - Total: 483,207
  - Density: 302.881/km^{2} (784.458/sq mi)

Salland (Dutch pronunciation: [ˈsɑlɑnt]; Low Saxon: Sallaand) is a historical dominion in the west and north of the present Dutch province of Overijssel. Nowadays Salland is usually used to indicate a region corresponding to the part of the former dominion more or less to the west of Twente.

== History ==
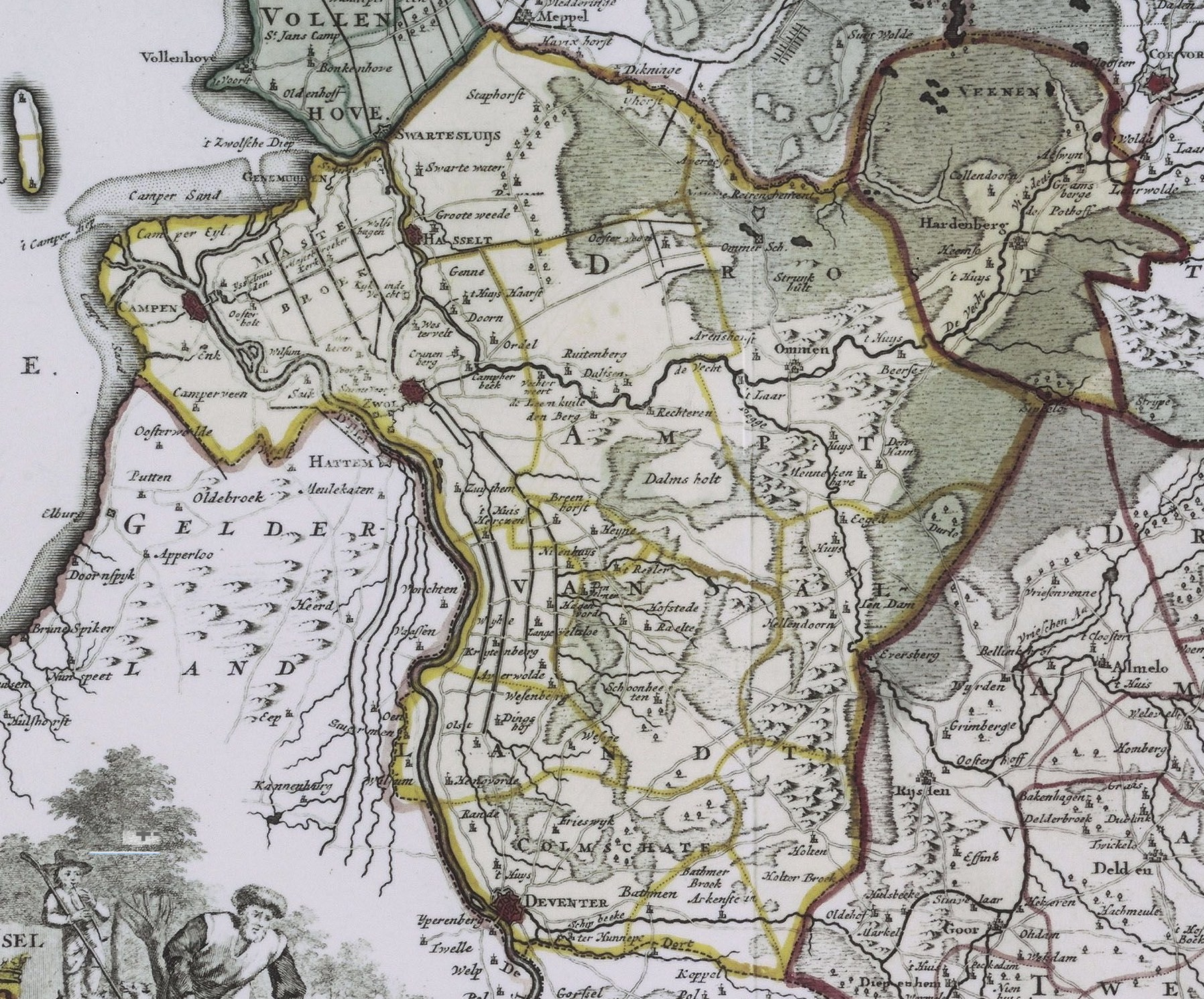
Salland in 1757 (the area with yellow borders; Hardenberg in the north-east is shown as a separate region)

Salland (or Salalant, as it was known) is first mentioned during the early Middle Ages. The region is most likely named after the river IJssel, anciently known as Isala, and the lakeland Sallzee at the confluence of the rivers Vecht and IJssel. The region may be the original residence of the Salian Franks.

Salalant at this time was a shire (gouw) made up of the area between Wijhe, Mastenbroek, and Dalfsen, in other words, the region circling Zwolle. In 795, Salalant belonged to a count Wracharius and remained in his family until the 11th century. In 814, mention is made of a Salahom, located where the IJssel empties into the Sallzee, and of its acquisition by the Lorsch Abbey (near Worms). In 1086, the four parts of Oversticht (i.e., Salland, Twente, Vollenhove, and Drenthe) belonged first to Egbert III, descendant of Wracharius, and count of Salland, Westergo, and Estergo, but were confiscated by Holy Roman Emperor Henry IV, given to the Prince-Bishopric of Utrecht, and incorporated into the margravate of Islegowe.

Salalant gradually grew to the north as far as the rivers Meppelerdiep and Reest and to the west as far as the Regge. In 1046 Deventer and its vicinity belonged to the county of Hamaland but was incorporated along with the area between Dalfsen and Gramsbergen into Salland in 1246. In 1225, the office of episcopal sheriff (bisschoppelijke schout) for Salland was established, and in 1308 the bishop granted a dike-right (dijkrecht) over the land between the Hunnepe to the coast; this area later became known as the Salland sheriffdom (Sallandse Schouw). In 1336, the bishop pledged over almost all of Overijssel – including Salland – to the count of Guelders. Ten years later, the new bishop, Jan van Arkel, was able to retrieve the pledged territories. He also reformed administration by breaking Oversticht into the three sheriffdoms of Twente, Vollenhove, and Salland. In time they were demoted to bailiwicks (drostambten), and even though they were superseded by the sheriffdoms of IJsselmuiden, Diepenheim, Haaksbergen, and the sheriff of Hasselt was made high sheriff, the original three bailiwicks have nonetheless served as the basis for Oversticht's three-way division to this day.

When the Archbishop of Utrecht sold his domains to Holy Roman Emperor Charles V in 1527, Salland became one of the three constituent parts of the new dominion of Overijssel, which in turn became one of the seven provinces of the Dutch Republic in 1581 (Drenthe became a dominion in its own right).

== Geography ==
The borders of Salland are not well defined, but the largest area which may be indicated by Salland, corresponding to the historical dominion, is bound to the west by the provincial border with Gelderland, which is partly formed by river IJssel; to the north by the Meppelerdiep stream and the provincial border with Drente, which partly consists of the Reest stream; to the east by the borders with the German state of Lower Saxony and the eastern Overijssel region of Twente; and to the south by the border with the Gelderland region of Achterhoek, part of which is formed by the Schipbeek stream – in other words, all of Overijssel with the exception of Twente and the municipality of Steenwijkerland.

Geologically, most of Salland's landscape consists of a lowland covered with river sediment. To the east, large moors have been drained to provide pastures. These moors, together with the hilly Holterberg region, were the natural border with Twente. On the Holterberg, stretches of the originally vast heathland have been preserved. In the northwest, reclaimed boglands used for peat digging have resulted in low-lying areas vulnerable to flooding, pre-1932 (in that year, the Zuiderzee was closed off from the North Sea to become the IJsselmeer lake).

Salland is a low-lying area dominated by a number of rivers and streams, which have deposited rich layers of river clay. The most important of these waterways is of course river IJssel; others include the Zwarte Water and (Overijsselse) Vecht rivers; the Regge stream, which flows through Twente to spend its last few kilometers in Salland before ending in the Vecht near Ommen; the Schipbeek stream; and the Soestwetering stream, which merges with a number of lesser streams near Zwolle to form river Zwarte Water.

Three of Overijssel's major cities, Deventer, Kampen and the province's capital, Zwolle, lie within Salland, if the definition ascribing the largest area to Salland, is used. Other places of import include Ommen and Hardenberg, which are both quite often described as being in the "Vechtstreek" (Vecht Region) or "Vechtdal" (Vecht Valley), named after the river, rather than in Salland.

Nowadays however, Salland is usually used to indicate the rural area in between Deventer, Zwolle, Ommen and Rijssen-Holten, with Raalte being in the centre of that era and thus having been able to become the "unofficial capital" of Salland. The Salland tourism board describes Salland as the land in between the river IJssel and the hills, and agrees thus on a much smaller Salland than the historical dominion of that name.

=== Municipal reforms and the boundary with Twente ===
Intra-Overijssel municipal reforms of the early twenty-first century have somewhat blurred the boundary between Salland and Twente, as municipalities historically associated with Salland have merged with Twente municipalities (and now form part of the Twente Region as defined by the Dutch government). Specifically, this regards Holten (now part of the Rijssen-Holten municipality) and Den Ham (now part of the Twenterand municipality). Industrial and commercial ties with Twente and its location east of the Sallandse Heuvelrug hill ridge caused the municipality of Hellendoorn to switch association earlier in the twentieth century.

=== Extreme points of Salland ===
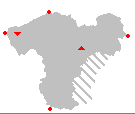
Extreme points of Salland

- Northernmost Point — northern edge of the municipality of Staphorst
- Southernmost Point — southern edge of the municipality of Deventer
- Westernmost Point — mouth of river IJssel, municipality of Kampen
- Easternmost Point — eastern edge of Hardenberg municipality
- Highest Point — Archemerberg hill near Lemele in the municipality of Ommen (77 m above sea level)
- Lowest point — Mastenbroek polder, municipality of Kampen (2 m below sea level)

(The boundary changes mentioned in the previous paragraph have no effect on the location of the extreme points of Salland.)

=== Inhabitants ===
The total population of Salland is estimated to be around 500.000, making up approximately half of the total inhabitants of the province of Overijssel (the other half being Twente).
