= Arriërveld =

- Hamlet
- The village (dark red) and the statistical district (light green) of Arriërveld in the municipality of Ommen.

- Location in the province of Overijssel in the Netherlands Arriërveld (Netherlands)
- Coordinates: 52°33′47″N 6°25′54″E
- Country: Netherlands
- Province: Overijssel
- Municipality: Ommen

Area
  - Total: 8.55 km^{2} (3.30 sq mi)
- Elevation: 6 m (20 ft)

Population (2021)
  - Total: 90
  - Density: 11/km^{2} (27/sq mi)
- Time zone: UTC+1 (CET)
  - Summer (DST): UTC+2 (CEST)
- Postal code: 7735
- Dialing code: 0529

Arriërveld is a hamlet in the Dutch province of Overijssel. It is a part of the municipality of Ommen, and lies about 18 km (11 mi) south of Hoogeveen.

It was first mentioned in 1867 as Arriën Veld, and means field near Arriën. The postal authorities have placed it under Arriën.
