= Herbertus Bikker =

Herbertus Bikker (born 15 July 1915 in Wijngaarden, Netherlands – died 1 November 2008 in Haspe, Germany), also known as The Butcher of Ommen, was a Dutch war criminal. He was a member of the Waffen-SS. In this function, Bikker served as a guard at the prison and work camp Erika near Ommen. He received his nickname due to his brutal behaviour at the prison camp.

Bikker is the alleged murderer of Dutch resistance fighter Jan Houtman who was killed, twenty-seven years old, on 17 November 1944.

Following the end of World War II, he was sentenced to death by a Dutch court, albeit his sentence was later commuted to life in prison. Together with Klaas Carel Faber, Sander Borgers and four other convicted war criminals, he managed to escape from prison in Breda on 26 December 1952 and fled to Germany, crossing the border at Ubbergen near Cleves. Settling in the city of Hagen, he lived in Germany undetected until 1995. Following a decree from 1943, foreign members of the Waffen-SS automatically received German nationality. Germany does not extradite its own nationals.

Finally, being one of the few surviving war criminals, he was taken to court after all in Germany. Bikker's only chance to evade prosecution and trial was to claim diminished responsibility due to illness. When a doctor attested Bikker's limited responsibility, his case came to court. However, following a breakdown and fainting in court, neurologists advised against Bikker standing trial due illness. Court was adjourned on 2 February 2004.

Bikker lived in Hagen as a pensioner until his death, which was not made public until April 2009.
