= Kamp Erika =

Nazi concentration camp

Kamp Erika Arbeitseinsatzlager Erika
- Concentration camp
- Location of the camp in the Netherlands
- Coordinates: 52°30′15″N 6°26′32″E
- Other names: Kamp Ommen
- Location: Ommen, the Netherlands
- Operated by: Generalkommissariat zur besonderen Verwendung
- First built: 1920
- Operational: Summer 1941; 5 April 1945; Liberated 11 April 1945
- Liberated by: (Evacuated by the Germans) Canadians
- Notable books: Knackers achter prikkeldraad: kamp Erika bij Ommen, 1941-1945 by Guusta Veldman

Erika concentration camp (Dutch: Kamp Erika; German: Arbeitseinsatzlager Erika) was a Nazi concentration camp during the Second World War. The camp was situated at the Besthemerberg hill near Ommen, in the East of the Netherlands. The camp was designated mostly for Dutchmen convicted of black market trade or resistance to occupational authorities; only eight Jews were detained here.

The camp was notorious for the brutal behaviour of its personnel, leading Dutch judges to refuse to send convicts there in 1943. The camp was turned into an Arbeitserziehungslager mostly for those refusing to do forced labour, but in the autumn of 1944 it once again became a penal camp. The camp was liberated on 11 April 1945.

Herbertus Bikker, also known as The Butcher of Ommen (Dutch: De Beul van Ommen), was a member of the Waffen-SS. He served as a guard at the Erika prison and work camp. He received his nickname due to his brutal behaviour at the prison camp.

From 1945 to 1946, the camp was instead used to detain Dutchmen who had collaborated with the German occupiers.
