= Bikker =

Bikker is a Dutch surname. Notable people with the surname include:

- Herbertus Bikker (1915–2008), Dutch war criminal
- Mirjam Bikker (born 1982), Dutch politician
