= Zeesse =

- Hamlet
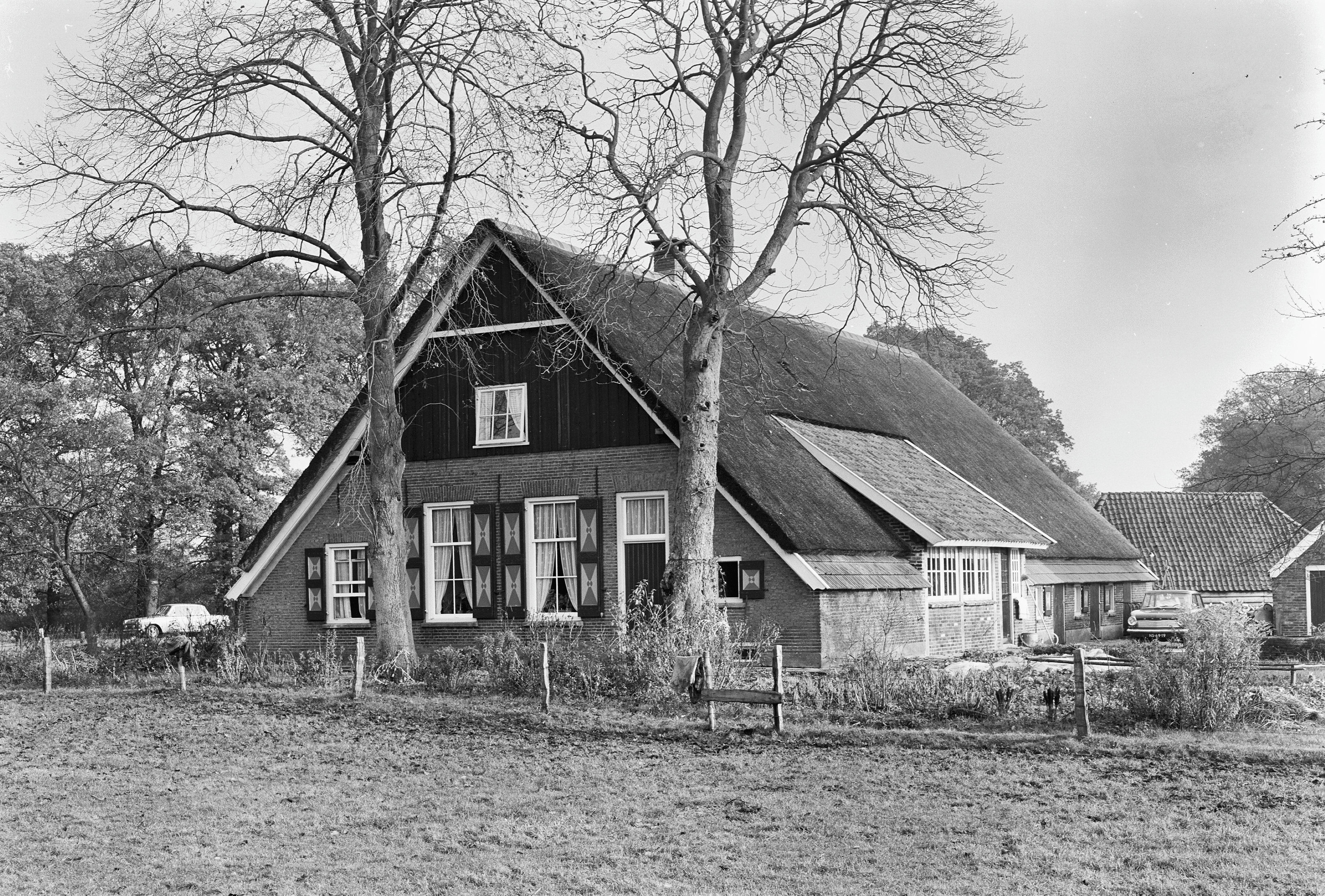
- Farm in Zeesse

- Zeesse in the municipality of Ommen.

- Location in the province of Overijssel in the Netherlands Zeesse (Netherlands)
- Coordinates: 52°30′42″N 6°26′5″E
- Country: Netherlands
- Province: Overijssel
- Municipality: Ommen

Area
  - Total: 1.64 km^{2} (0.63 sq mi)
- Elevation: 7 m (23 ft)

Population (2021)
  - Total: 15
  - Density: 9.1/km^{2} (24/sq mi)
- Time zone: UTC+1 (CET)
  - Summer (DST): UTC+2 (CEST)
- Postal code: 7731
- Dialing code: 0529

Zeesse is a hamlet in the Dutch province of Overijssel. It is a part of the municipality of Ommen, and lies about 23 km east of Zwolle.

It was first mentioned between 1381 and 1383 as "to Zese". The etymology is unclear. The postal authorities have placed it under Ommen. In 1840, it had a population of 154 people, but was probably a larger area than the current definition.
