= Besthmen =

- Hamlet
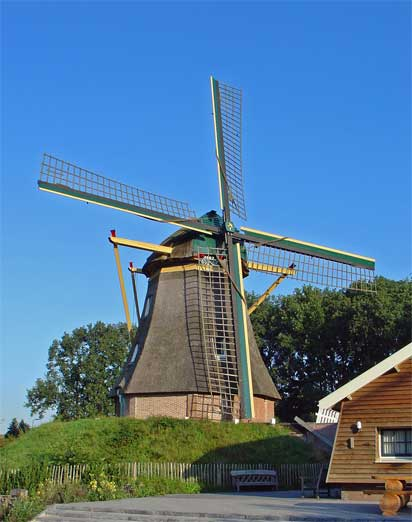
- The mill of Besthmen

- Besthmen in the municipality of Ommen.

- Location in the province of Overijssel in the Netherlands Besthmen (Netherlands)
- Coordinates: 52°30′12″N 6°26′13″E
- Country: Netherlands
- Province: Overijssel
- Municipality: Ommen

Area
  - Total: 5.96 km^{2} (2.30 sq mi)
- Elevation: 7 m (23 ft)

Population (2021)
  - Total: 175
  - Density: 29.4/km^{2} (76.0/sq mi)
- Time zone: UTC+1 (CET)
  - Summer (DST): UTC+2 (CEST)
- Postal code: 7731
- Dialing code: 0592

Besthmen is a hamlet in the Dutch province of Overijssel. It is a part of the municipality of Ommen, and lies about 22 km east of Zwolle.

It was first mentioned between 1381 and 1383 Bestmannyng. The etymology is unclear. The postal authorities have placed it under Ommen. In 1840, it was home to 135 people. The Besthmenermolen is a former gristmill which was constructed in 1862. It was restored in 1995.
