= Varsen =

- Hamlet
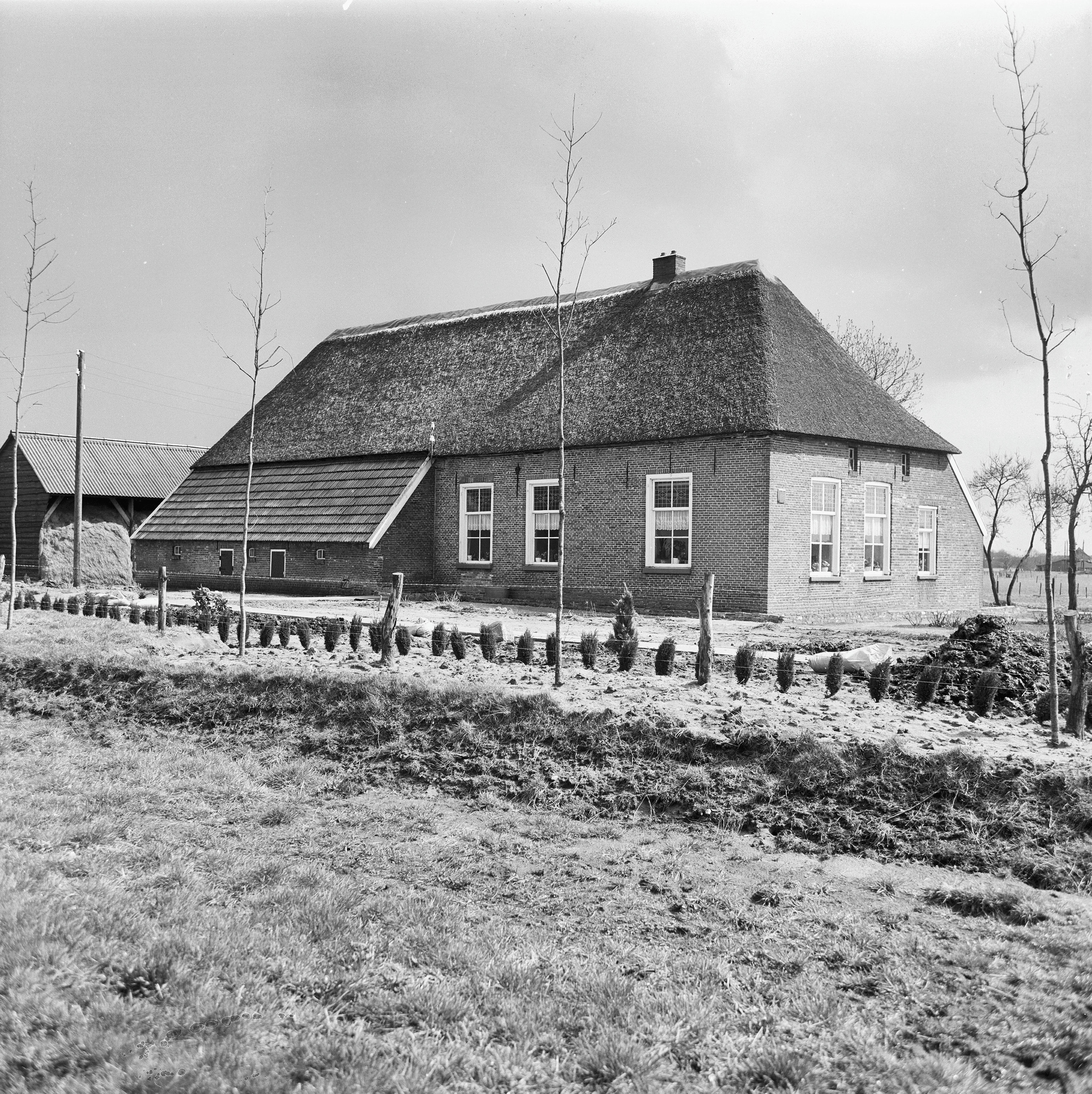
- Farm in Varsen

- The village (dark red) and the statistical district (light green) of Varsen in the municipality of Ommen.

- Location in the province of Overijssel in the Netherlands Varsen (Netherlands)
- Coordinates: 52°31′22″N 6°22′57″E
- Country: Netherlands
- Province: Overijssel
- Municipality: Ommen

Area
  - Total: 12.13 km^{2} (4.68 sq mi)
- Elevation: 7 m (23 ft)

Population (2021)
  - Total: 720
  - Density: 59/km^{2} (150/sq mi)
- Time zone: UTC+1 (CET)
  - Summer (DST): UTC+2 (CEST)
- Postal code: 7731
- Dialing code: 0529

Varsen is a hamlet in the Dutch province of Overijssel. It is a part of the municipality of Ommen, and lies about 19 km east of Zwolle.

It was first mentioned between 1381 and 1383 as Versen. The etymology is unclear. The postal authorities have placed it under Ommen. In 1840, it was home to 279 people. Archaeological finds have been discovered near Varsen which indicate that the area has been settled by the Funnelbeaker culture.
