= J. H. A. Lokin =

Dutch academic (1945–2022)

Jan Lokin
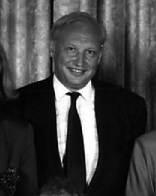
- Lokin in 1992
- Born: Johannes Henricus Antonius Lokin; 21 February 1945; Ommen, Netherlands
- Died: 19 June 2022 (aged 77); Groningen, Netherlands
- Occupation: academic

Academic background
- Education: Leiden University; University of Groningen (M.L.)
- Doctoral advisor: H.J. Scheltema

Academic work
- Discipline: Legal history
- Sub-discipline: Roman law
- Institutions: University of Groningen

Johannes Henricus Antonius Lokin (21 February 1945 – 19 June 2022), also known as Jan Lokin, was a Dutch professor in legal history, specialising in Roman law at the University of Groningen.

Lokin studied at Leiden University and the University of Groningen and obtained his Master of Laws degree in 1967. In 1973, he graduated under Prof. H.J. Scheltema, whom he succeeded as a professor in Roman law at the University of Groningen in 1977.

He was a member of the Royal Netherlands Academy of Arts and Sciences since 2002. He was highly published in history of law.

Lokin died in Groningen on 19 June 2022, at the age of 77.
