= Witharen =

- Hamlet
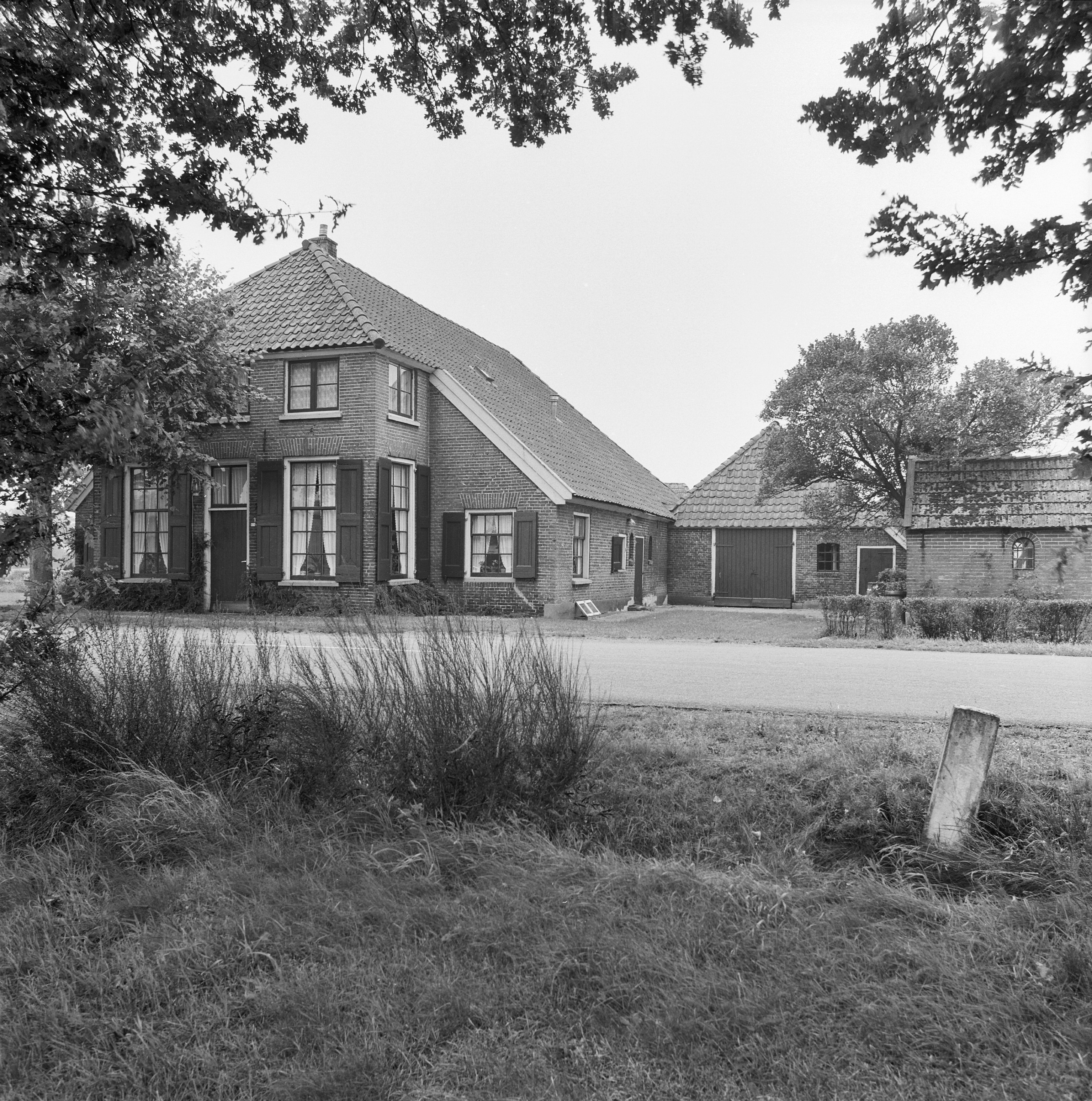
- Farm in Witharen

- Witharen in the municipality of Ommen.

- Location in the province of Overijssel in the Netherlands Witharen (Netherlands)
- Coordinates: 52°33′39″N 6°23′45″E
- Country: Netherlands
- Province: Overijssel
- Municipality: Ommen

Area
  - Total: 10.73 km^{2} (4.14 sq mi)
- Elevation: 7 m (23 ft)

Population (2021)
  - Total: 460
  - Density: 43/km^{2} (110/sq mi)
- Time zone: UTC+1 (CET)
  - Summer (DST): UTC+2 (CEST)
- Postal code: 7738
- Dialing code: 0523

Witharen is a hamlet in the Dutch province of Overijssel. It is a part of the municipality of Ommen, and lies about 19 km south of Hoogeveen.

It was first mentioned in 1533 as "bij Witthaeren", and means "white sandy ridge".
