= Stegeren =

- Hamlet
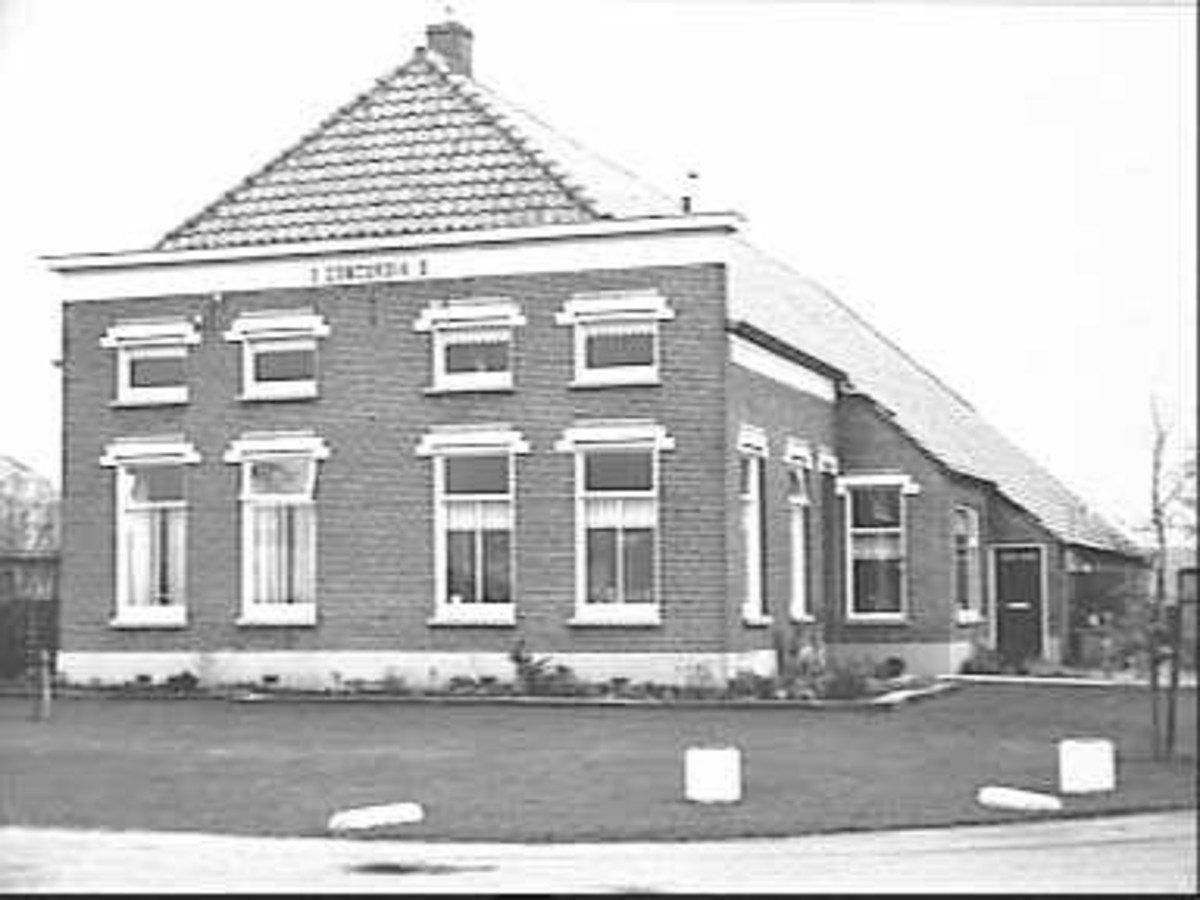
- Farm in Stegeren

- The village (dark red) and the statistical district (light green) of Stegeren in the municipality of Ommen.

- Location in the province of Overijssel in the Netherlands Stegeren (Netherlands)
- Coordinates: 52°31′47″N 6°30′18″E
- Country: Netherlands
- Province: Overijssel
- Municipality: Ommen

Area
  - Total: 9.02 km^{2} (3.48 sq mi)
- Elevation: 7 m (23 ft)

Population (2021)
  - Total: 155
  - Density: 17.2/km^{2} (44.5/sq mi)
- Time zone: UTC+1 (CET)
  - Summer (DST): UTC+2 (CEST)
- Postal code: 7737
- Dialing code: 0529

Stegeren is a hamlet in the Dutch province of Overijssel. It is a part of the municipality of Ommen, and lies about 21 km north of Almelo.

It was first mentioned in 1244 as Steyghere. The etymology is unclear. In 1840, it was home to 140 people.

Stegeren played an important role in the Dutch Resistance during World War II. A dropping zone was located in the hamlet where 48 tons of goods and ammunition and nine agents were dropped. Despite numerous attempts to locate the parachutists, they were never discovered. In 1985, a monument has been placed at the site.
