= Vinkenbuurt =

- Hamlet
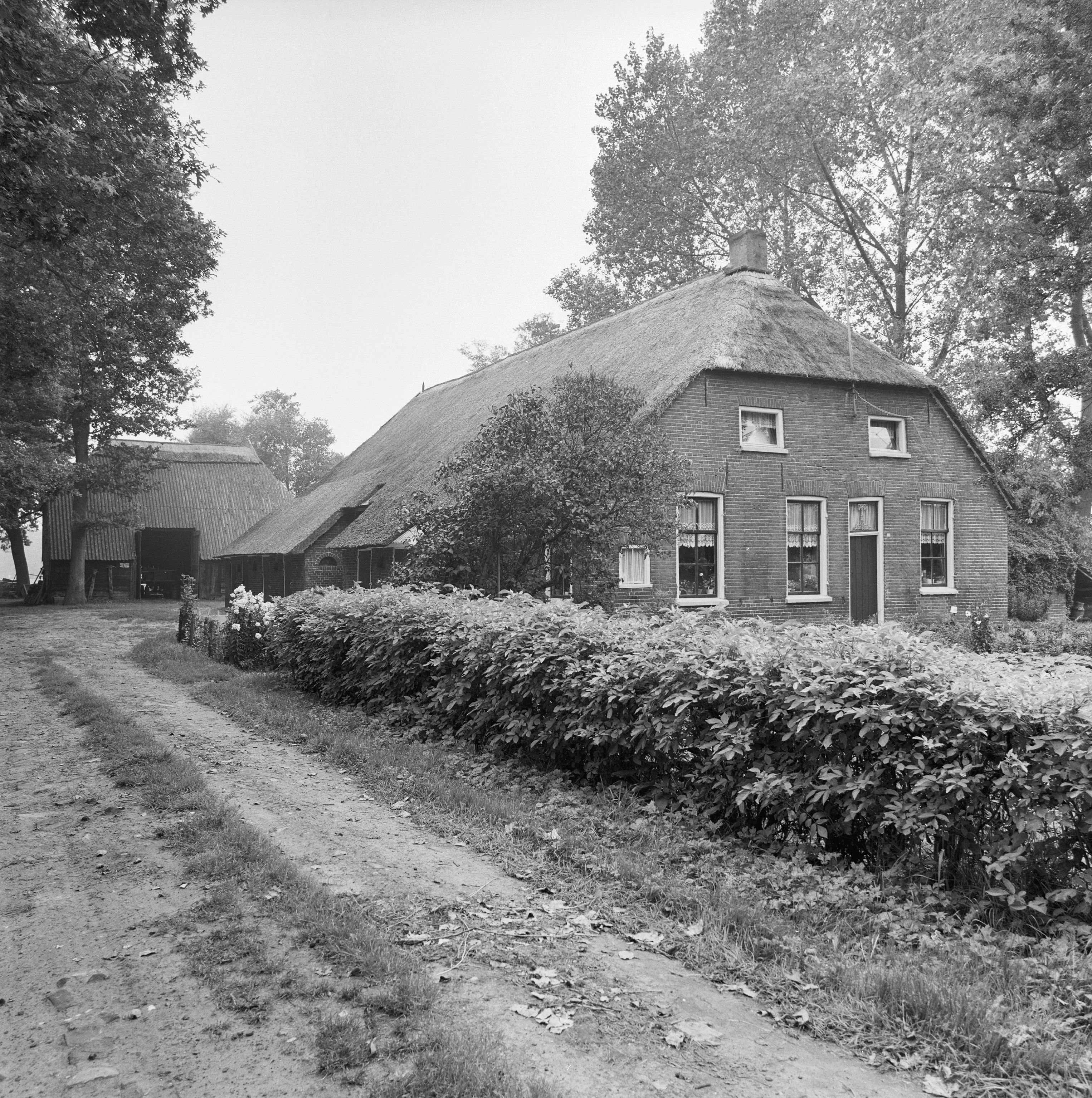
- Farm in Vinkenbuurt

- Vinkenbuurt in the municipality of Ommen.

- Location in the province of Overijssel in the Netherlands Vinkenbuurt (Netherlands)
- Coordinates: 52°34′44″N 6°21′9″E
- Country: Netherlands
- Province: Overijssel
- Municipality: Ommen

Area
  - Total: 6.60 km^{2} (2.55 sq mi)
- Elevation: 4 m (13 ft)

Population (2023)
  - Total: 435
  - Density: 65.9/km^{2} (171/sq mi)
- Time zone: UTC+1 (CET)
  - Summer (DST): UTC+2 (CEST)
- Postal code: 7739
- Dialing code: 0523

Vinkenbuurt is a hamlet in the Dutch province of Overijssel. It is part of the municipality of Ommen, and lies about 18 km south of Hoogeveen.

It was first mentioned in 1867 as Vinkenbuurt. The romantic explanation is "neighbourhood with chaffinchs" or it might mean "neighbourhood with bad peat". In 1927, a church was constructed, and given its population, it could qualify as a village, but probably remained a hamlet due its spread out farms.
