= Arriën =

- Hamlet
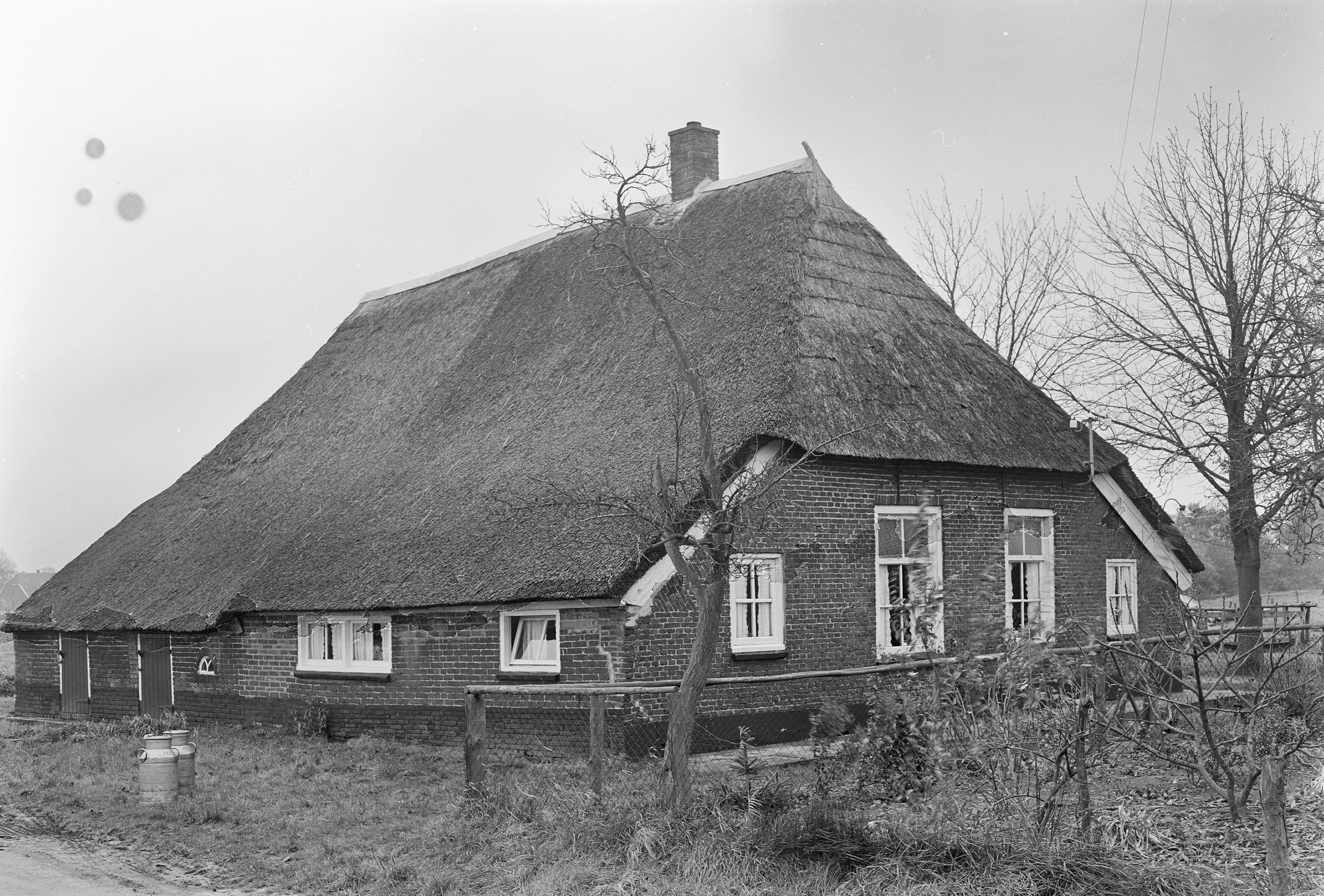
- A farm in Arriën

- The village (dark red) and the statistical district (light green) of Arriën in the municipality of Ommen.

- Location in the province of Overijssel in the Netherlands Arriën (Netherlands)
- Coordinates: 52°31′37″N 6°26′59″E
- Country: Netherlands
- Province: Overijssel
- Municipality: Ommen

Area
  - Total: 6.76 km^{2} (2.61 sq mi)
- Elevation: 6 m (20 ft)

Population (2021)
  - Total: 265
  - Density: 39.2/km^{2} (102/sq mi)
- Time zone: UTC+1 (CET)
  - Summer (DST): UTC+2 (CEST)
- Postal code: 7735
- Dialing code: 0529

Arriën is a hamlet in the Dutch province of Overijssel. It is a part of the municipality of Ommen, and lies about 22 km south of Hoogeveen.

It was first mentioned between 1294 and 1295 as "domus Theoderici de Arien", and means "plowed field". In 1840, it was home to 211 people.
