= Beerzerveld =

- Village
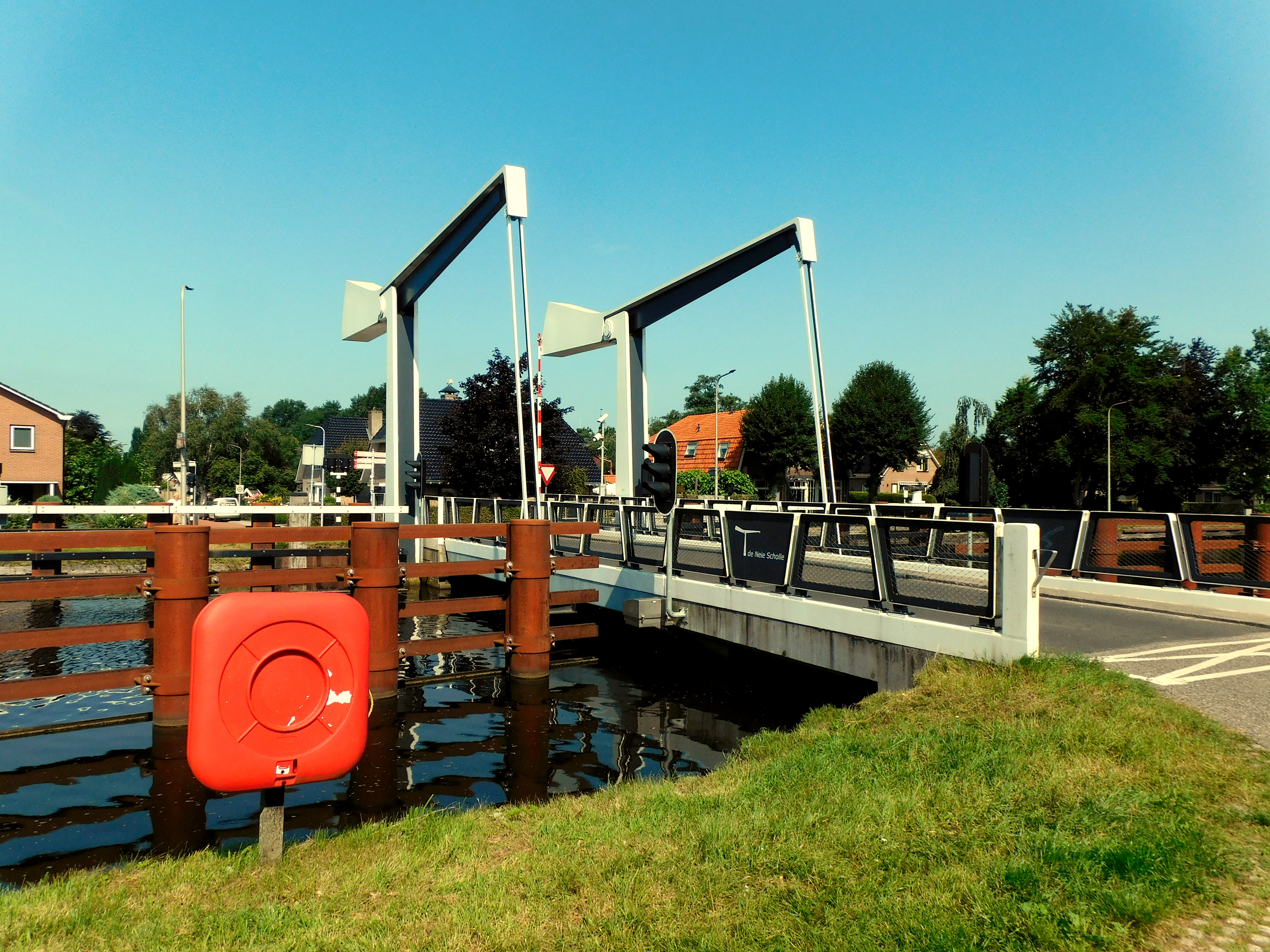
- Neie Scholle Bridge near Beerzerveld

- The village centre (dark green) and the statistical district (light green) of Beerzerveld in the municipality of Ommen.

- Location in the province of Overijssel in the Netherlands Beerzerveld (Netherlands)
- Coordinates: 52°29′38″N 6°34′36″E
- Country: Netherlands
- Province: Overijssel
- Municipality: Ommen

Area
  - Total: 0.22 km^{2} (0.085 sq mi)
- Elevation: 8 m (26 ft)

Population (2021)
  - Total: 520
  - Density: 2,400/km^{2} (6,100/sq mi)
- Time zone: UTC+1 (CET)
  - Summer (DST): UTC+2 (CEST)
- Postal code: 7685
- Dialing code: 0523

Beerzerveld is a village in the Dutch province of Overijssel. It is a part of the municipality of Ommen, and lies about 16 km north of Almelo.

It was first mentioned in 1860 as Beerzerveld, and means "heath near Beerze". Around 1860, people moved to Beerzerveld to excavate the peat. The hamlet nowadays cooperates with Mariënberg.

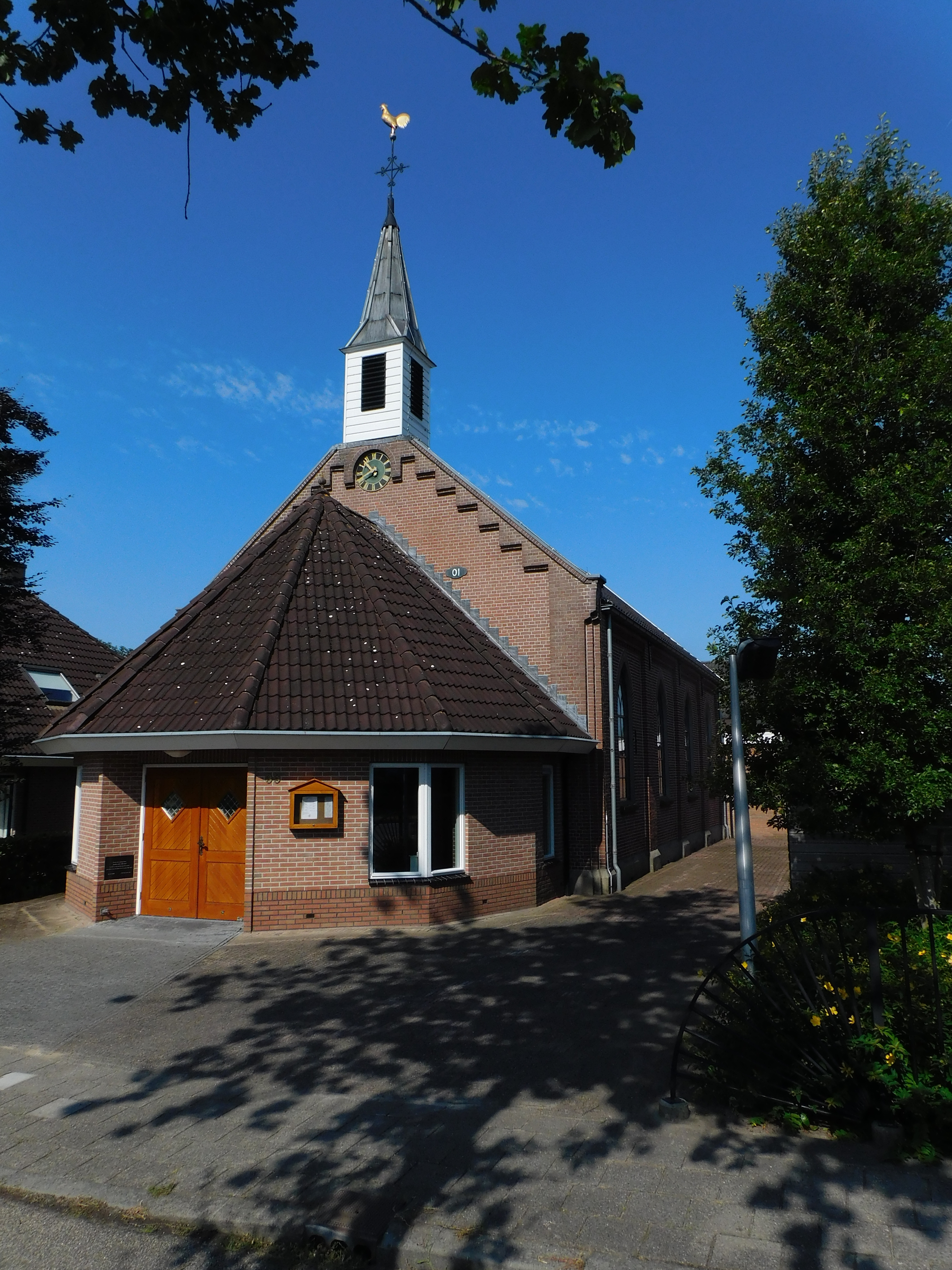
Church in Beerzerveld
