= Bosch Parade =

Netherlands biennial celebration

The Bosch Parade is a biennial celebration in the Netherlands in which creative artistic exhibits float by on the Dommel River, which can include swimmers, acrobats, welders, singers, and water sprayers. Floats are designed by professional artists and designers who collaborate with choreographers, composers, directors, and the final production requires many volunteers. The event is usually held during a few days each June. The artistic director is Miesjel van Gerwen. The celebration was named in honour of the 15th century Dutch painter Hieronymus Bosch. Guidelines include only minimal use of power or motors. It attracts thousands of visitors who watch from the banks of the river.
