= Ambt Ommen =

Former municipality in the Netherlands

Coordinates: 52°31′N 6°27′E

Ambt Ommen is a former municipality in the Dutch province of Overijssel. It consisted of the countryside surrounding the city of Ommen, which was a separate municipality.

Ambt Ommen existed from 1818 to 1923, when it became a part of Ommen.
