= Beerze =

- Hamlet
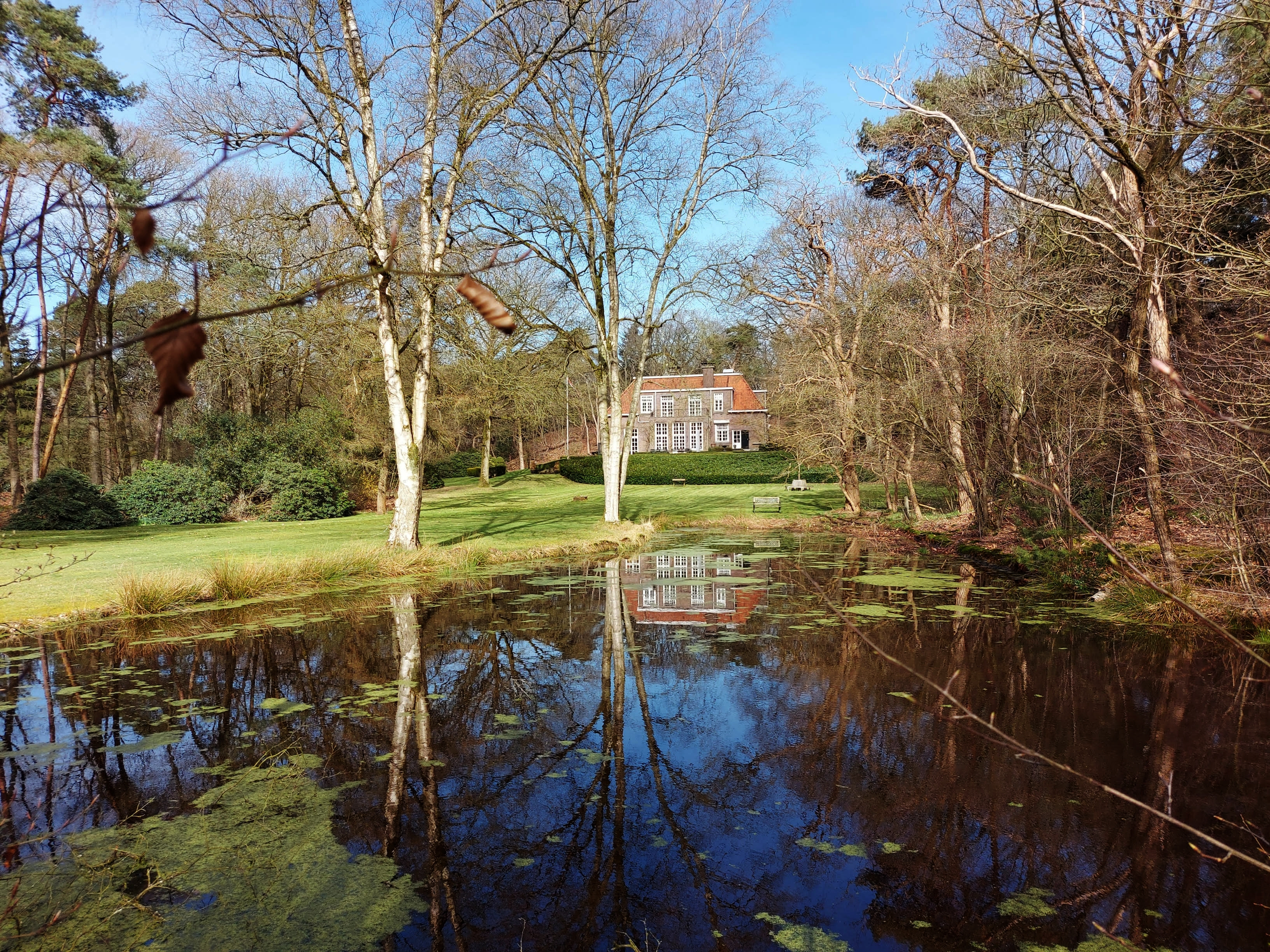
- House in Beerze

- The village (dark red) and the statistical district (light green) of Beerze in the municipality of Ommen.

- Location in the province of Overijssel in the Netherlands Beerze (Netherlands)
- Coordinates: 52°30′49″N 6°31′43″E
- Country: Netherlands
- Province: Overijssel
- Municipality: Ommen

Area
  - Total: 9.29 km^{2} (3.59 sq mi)
- Elevation: 8 m (26 ft)

Population (2021)
  - Total: 195
  - Density: 21.0/km^{2} (54.4/sq mi)
- Time zone: UTC+1 (CET)
  - Summer (DST): UTC+2 (CEST)
- Postal code: 7736
- Dialing code: 0523

Beerze is a hamlet in the Dutch province of Overijssel. It is a part of the municipality of Ommen, and lies about 20 km north of Almelo.

It was first mentioned between 1381 and 1383 as "to Beersen", a means "hedged area". In 1840, it was home to 154 people.
