= Regge (river) =

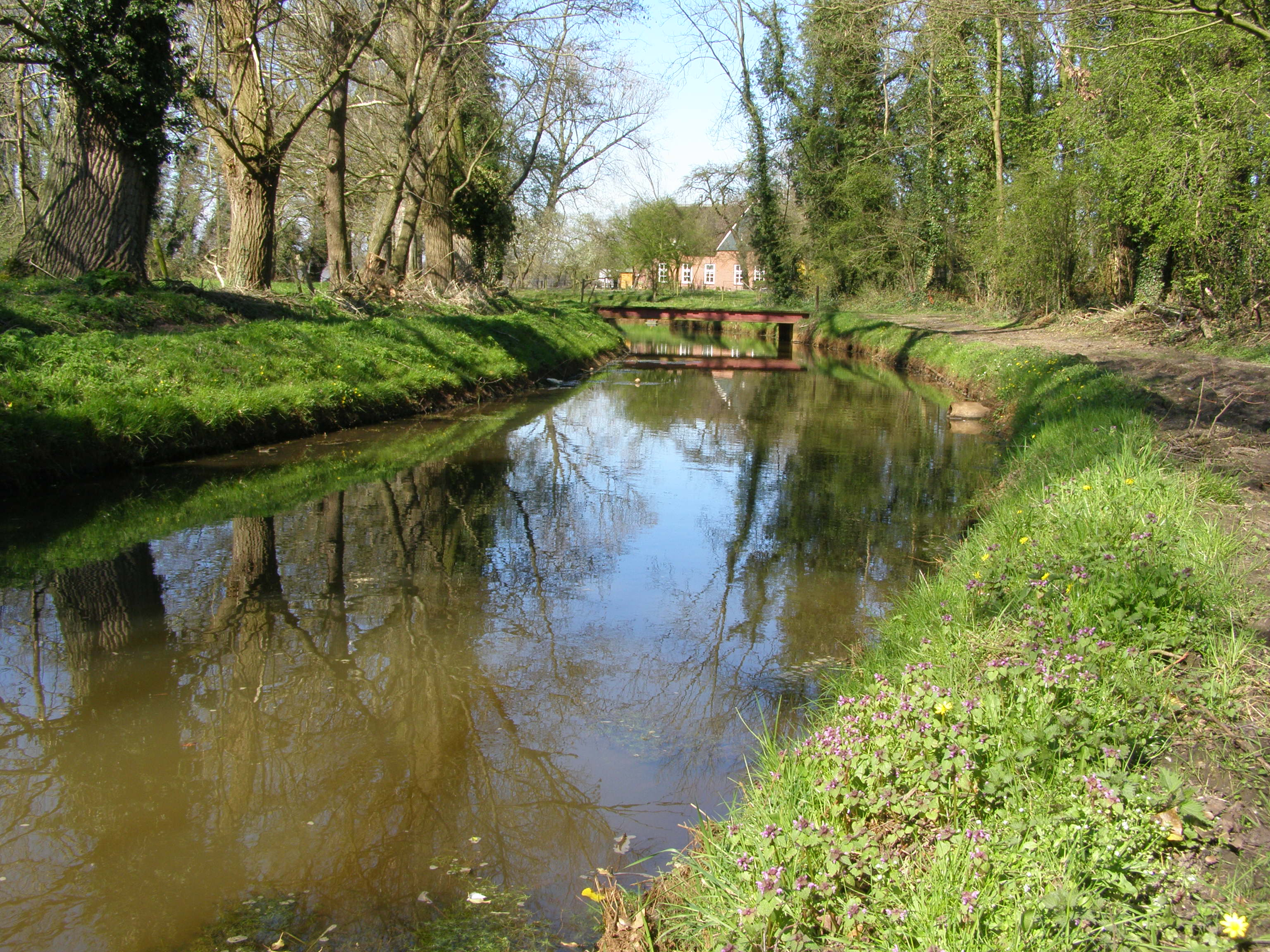

Location
- Country: Netherlands

Physical characteristics
- Source
  - location: near Goor
- Mouth: Vecht
  - location: near Ommen
  - coordinates: 52.5138°N 6.3817°E

Basin features
- Progression: Vechte→ Zwarte Water→ IJsselmeer

The Regge ['rɛɣə] is a river in the Netherlands. It is sometimes described as a stream. It is a tributary to the Vecht of Overijssel.

The source of the Regge is near the town Goor. It flows north through Rijssen, Nijverdal, and Hellendoorn. The Regge joins the Vecht near Ommen.

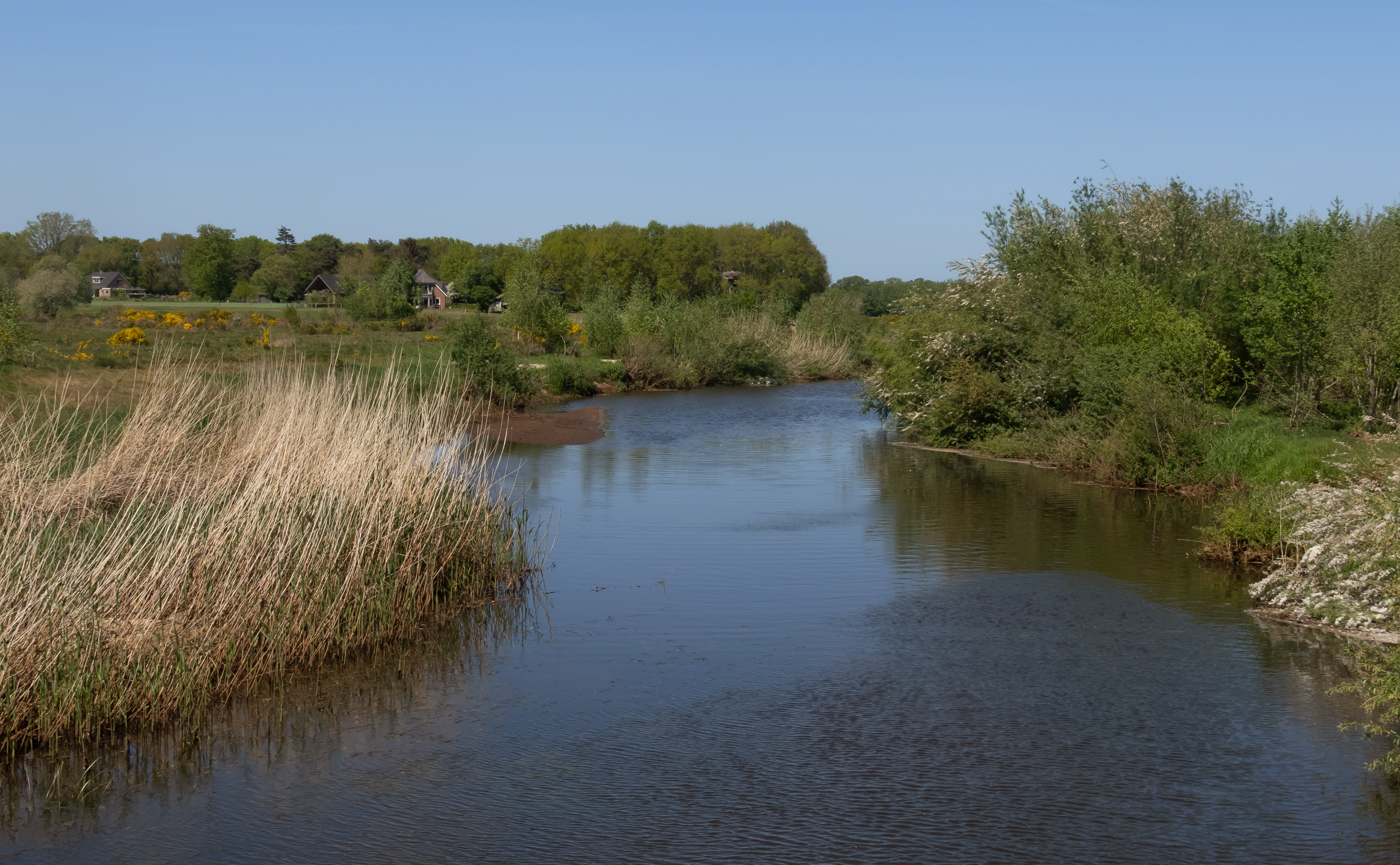
The Regge near Lemele
