= Second Münster War =

War between the Dutch Republic and Münster

- Part of the Franco-Dutch War
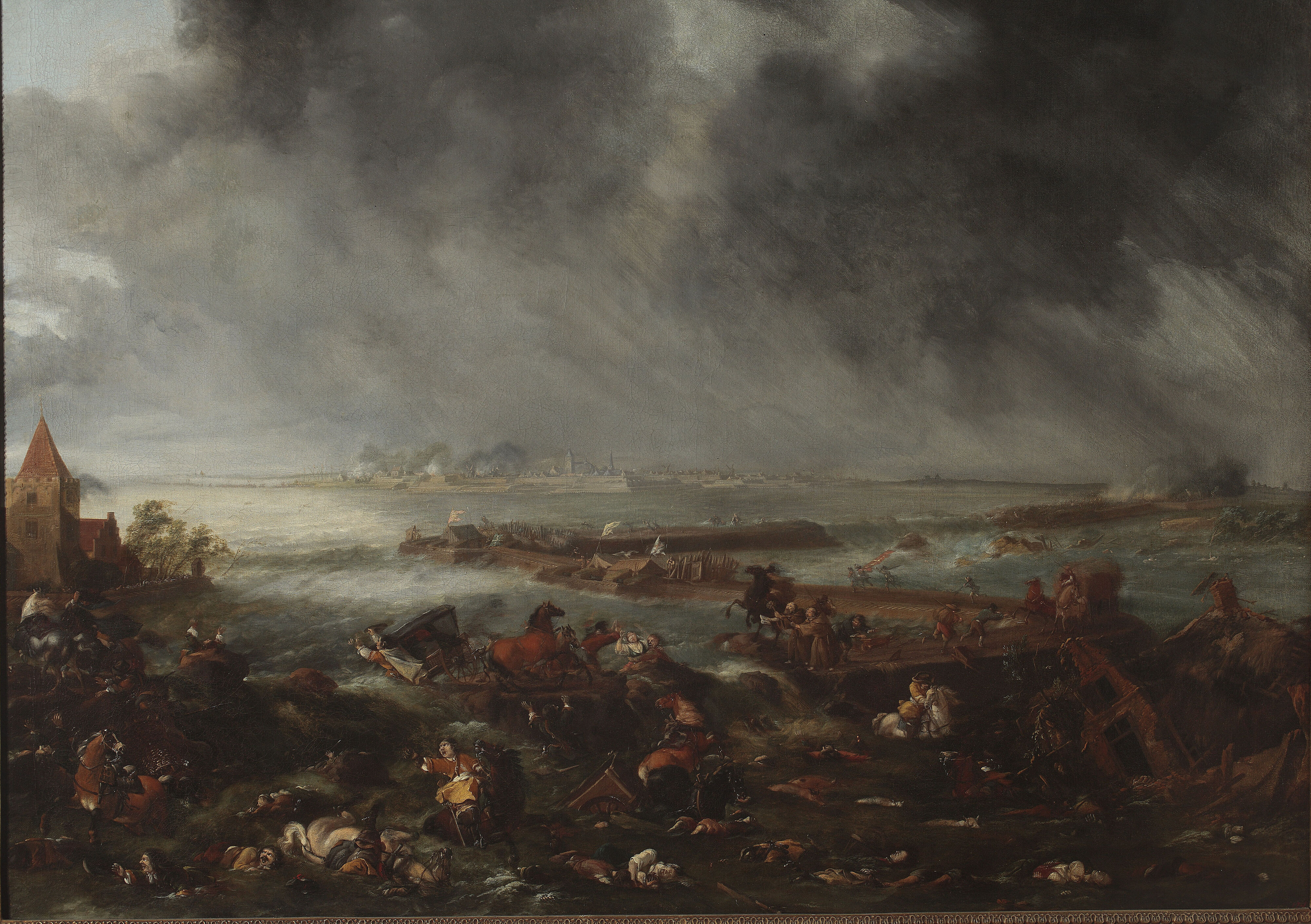
- The Siege of Groningen was the most important conflict and the turning point of the war
Date	1672–1674
Location	The Eastern and the Northern Netherlands
Result	Dutch victory: Bernhard von Galen renounces all claims in the Dutch Republic; Treaty of Cologne

Belligerents
Dutch Republic	Bishopric of Münster; Kingdom of France; Electorate of Cologne

Commanders and leaders
(Dutch Republic) Carl von Rabenhaupt (Dutch Republic) Hans Willem van Aylva (Dutch Republic) Nassau-Siegen (Dutch Republic) Henry Casimir II	Bernhard von Galen; Maximilian Henry

Strength
Unknown	30,000

The second Münster war (Dutch: tweede Münsterse oorlog) (German: zweiter Holländischer krieg) was a 2-year long conflict between the Dutch Republic and the Prince-Bishopric of Münster, which was backed by the Electorate of Cologne and France.

The war is mostly known for the failed attempt by Bernhard von Galen to capture Groningen. This event was a turning point of the war, which eventually lead to a Dutch victory due to the troops led by Bernhard von Galen being expelled from the Dutch Republic. The siege of Groningen earned Bernhard the nickname 'Bommen Berend' and is still celebrated as a holiday in the Netherlands.

== Background ==
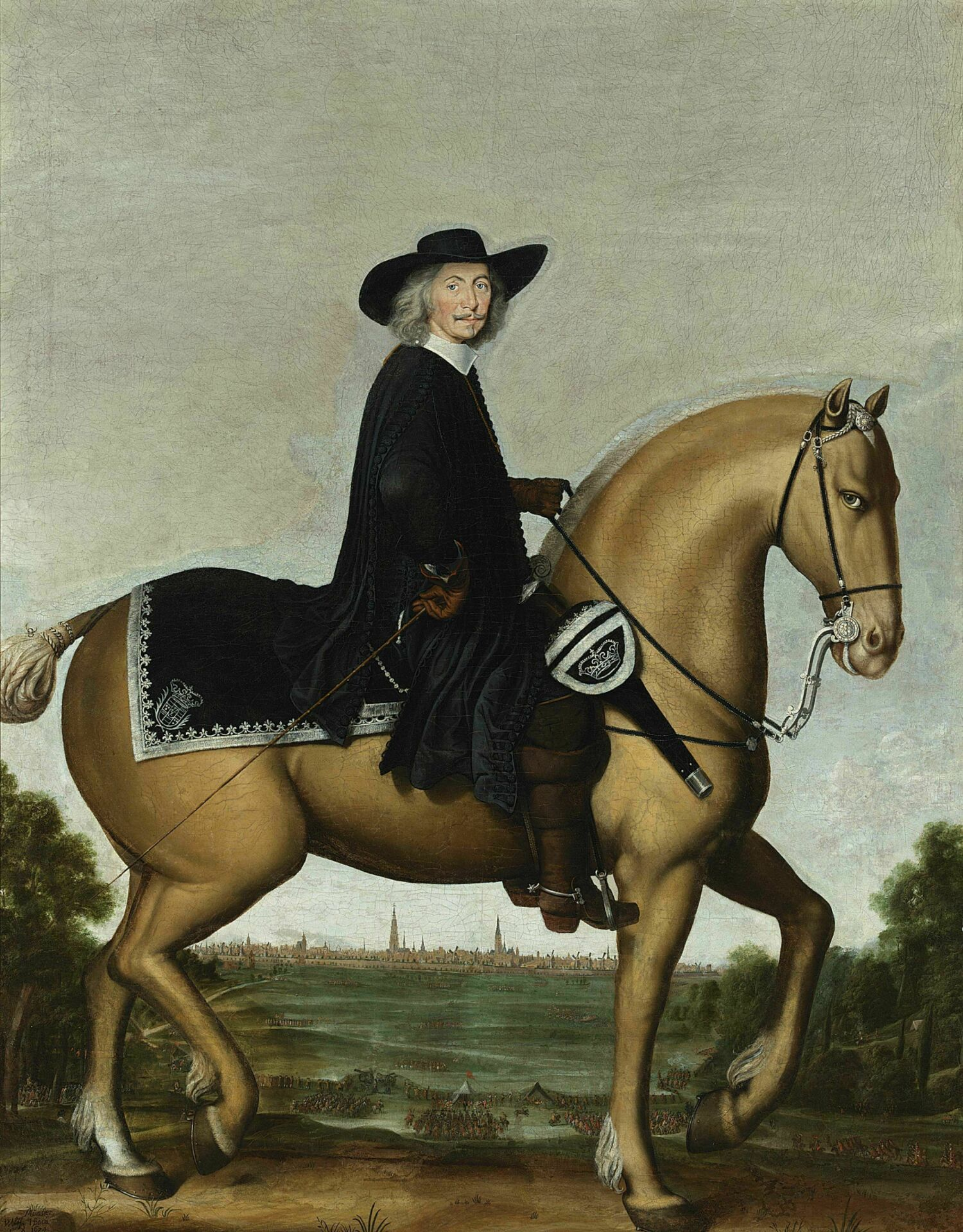
Portrait of Christoph Bernhard von Galen

Bernhard von Galen led an invasion of the Dutch Republic 7 years prior to this war, although it was not as major as the second war. But after the Battle of Jipsinghuizen, Bernhard von Galen lost 300 of his men, he eventually was forced to accept the humiliating treaty of Kleve, in which he had to renounce his claim to Borculo, to reduce his army to 3,000 men, and promised 'eternal' peace between him and the Dutch Republic. Although the war was considered a 'minor incident', it did show that the Dutch States Army had a lack of power and needed to be improved.

But the eternal peace promised in 1666 would not last, as Bernhard von Galen would become allied with Louis XIV to invade the Dutch Republic in 1672. Because on 26 May, two days after Louis XIV attacked Maastricht in 1672, Louis was able to bribe Bernhard von Galen to become allies with him, even though Bernhard was officially neutral during the war of Devolution.

The French began their offensives in early May 1672 by attacking Dutch outposts in the Rhine to bypass Dutch defenses in the south and the Spanish Netherlands, and under the command of François-Henri de Montmorency or simply 'Luxembourg', took the cities of Kleve, Rheinberg, Orsoy, Emmerich, Rees and Wesel in just under a week. This was due to the garrisons being undermanned and barely equipped, these cities which were occupied by Dutch forces after the Thirty Years' War were ceded back to Brandenburg-Prussia after the war.

== War ==
=== Before the siege of Groningen ===
With Bernhard von Galen joining the Franco-Dutch War on the side of Louis XIV, he immediately took action and invaded the Eastern Provinces of the Dutch Republic, and with the support of France and Cologne, he was able to capture a lot of cities in the Eastern provinces and was able to quickly advance into the North.

The first skirmishes began on 1 June, in which Bernhard von Galen, with the help of Maximilian Henry, invaded and took Lingen with an army of 30,000 men. Bernhard von Galen would then capture Overdinkel which allowed him to invade Twente, afterwards, Bernhard von Galen would capture Enschede.

After capturing Enschede, Bernhard von Galen would move towards Groenlo to help the French, in which he was able to capture the city with 100,000 soldiers against a garrison defended by 600 men. The siege began on 3 June and ended on 9 June. Bernhard von Galen would then take action himself and besiege and capture Bredevoort with an army of 2000 men against a garrison of 500 men, which surrendered after 6 days of fighting. Afterwards, the Dutch and French would fight a short battle near Lobith in which the Dutch lost 1,500 men. After the battle, the States of Holland and the States General had to completely abandon the Ijssel line in order to shift its focus on defending Holland, Zeeland and Utrecht. Although the battle resulted in a French victory, the French commander Condé was wounded in action, which meant that Turenne took over his role as supreme commander of the French forces. Turenne would split the French army into two and capture Doesburg and Nijmegen after two separate sieges, along with a part of North Brabant.

These two sieges allowed Bernhard von Galen to further invade Overijssel, and as a consequence captured many cities, including Hattem, Lochem and Harderwijk. Around the same time Deventer would fall after a siege on 21 June, and Zwolle which fell one day later. The capture and subsequent looting and sacking of the cities that were captured by invading forces caused a lot of civilians to flee their homes to parts of the country that had not yet been occupied. And the cities of Steenwijk and Kuinre were captured on 26 June.

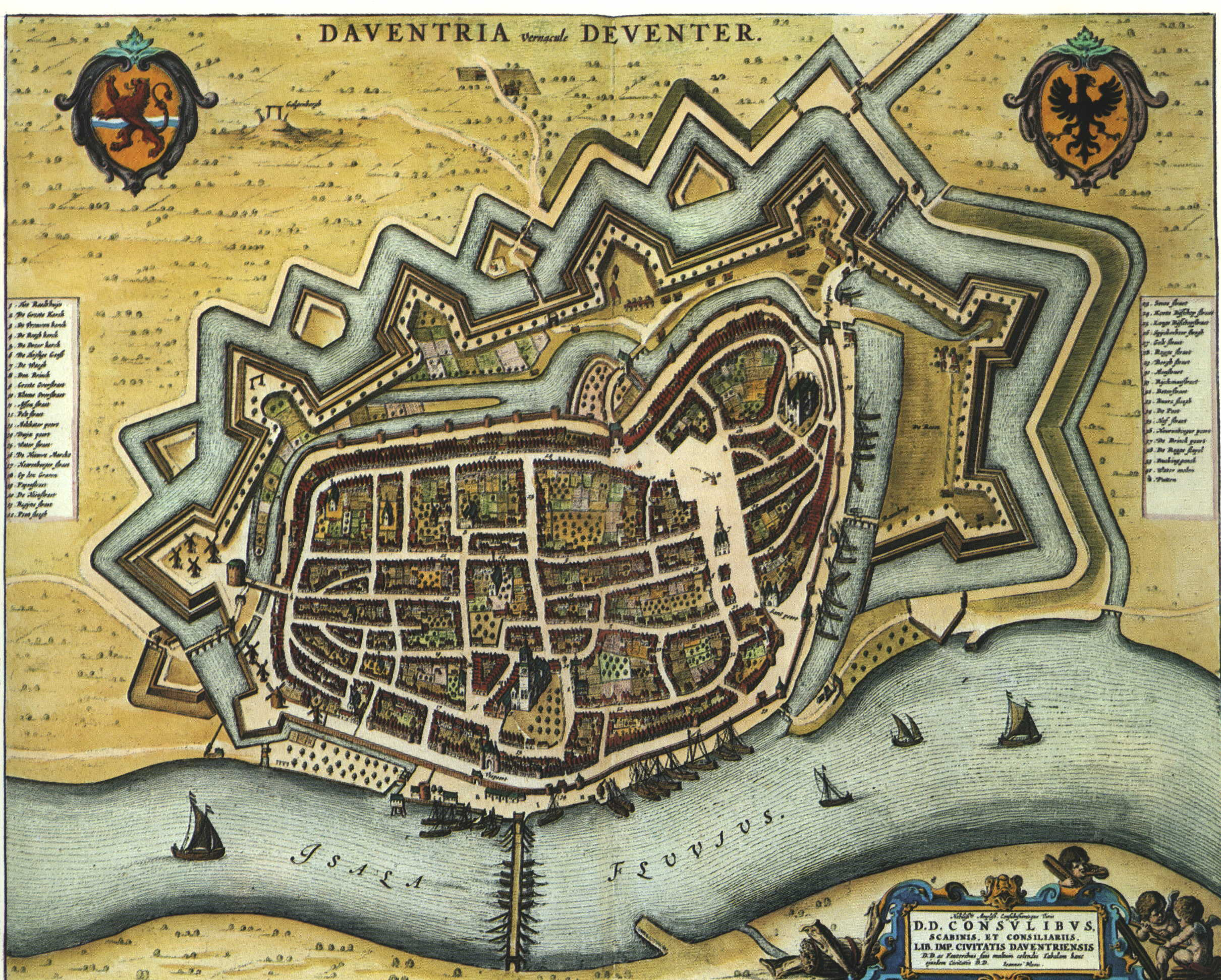
Depiction of Deventer, which was besieged by von Galen

Even though Bernhard von Galen's forces saw huge success in the east, he was not allowed to make further advances westward because this would offend his French allies. Maximilian Henry gained rights to the city of Deventer, but Bernhard and Maximilian's forces had to retreat to the rear of the Ijssel and had to lay their focus on the Northern provinces. After plundering Rijssen for the second time, Bernhard von Galen would move towards the Ommerschans in order to capture it, the Ommerschans was defended by a garrison that consisted of 150 musketeers and 55 pikemen. But after spotting Bernhard von Galen's march towards the Ommerschans, they subsequently fled towards Groningen, and the Ommerschans would be captured without a fight. Shortly after, the states of Holland proclaimed William III of Orange as Stadtholder on 4 July.

Quickly after capturing the Ommerschans, Bernhard von Galen would start the siege of Coevorden, the siege began on 1 July, and after 11 days of fighting, the city surrendered. Due to the strategic position of Coevorden, the capture would make it possible for Benrhard to overrun the rest of Drenthe and large parts of Groningen (province). And also opened up a possible invasion of Friesland, which by this point, had not yet been invaded by French or Münsterite forces. To make further conquests, Bernhard von Galen would have to capture the strategic Fort Bourtange, but that failed after an unsuccessful siege which had started on 11 July. Afterwards, Bernhard von Galen would move towards Groningen to start a siege, the city was well prepared in comparison to the other cities that he had besieged or captured, and was defended by Carl von Rabenhaupt.

=== The siege of Groningen ===
On 21 July, Bernhard von Galen arrived before the city of Groningen. The soldiers who defended the city, led by Carl von Rabenhaupt and Hans Willem van Aylva were also backed by refugees who fled from Drenthe after it was conquered by Münster.

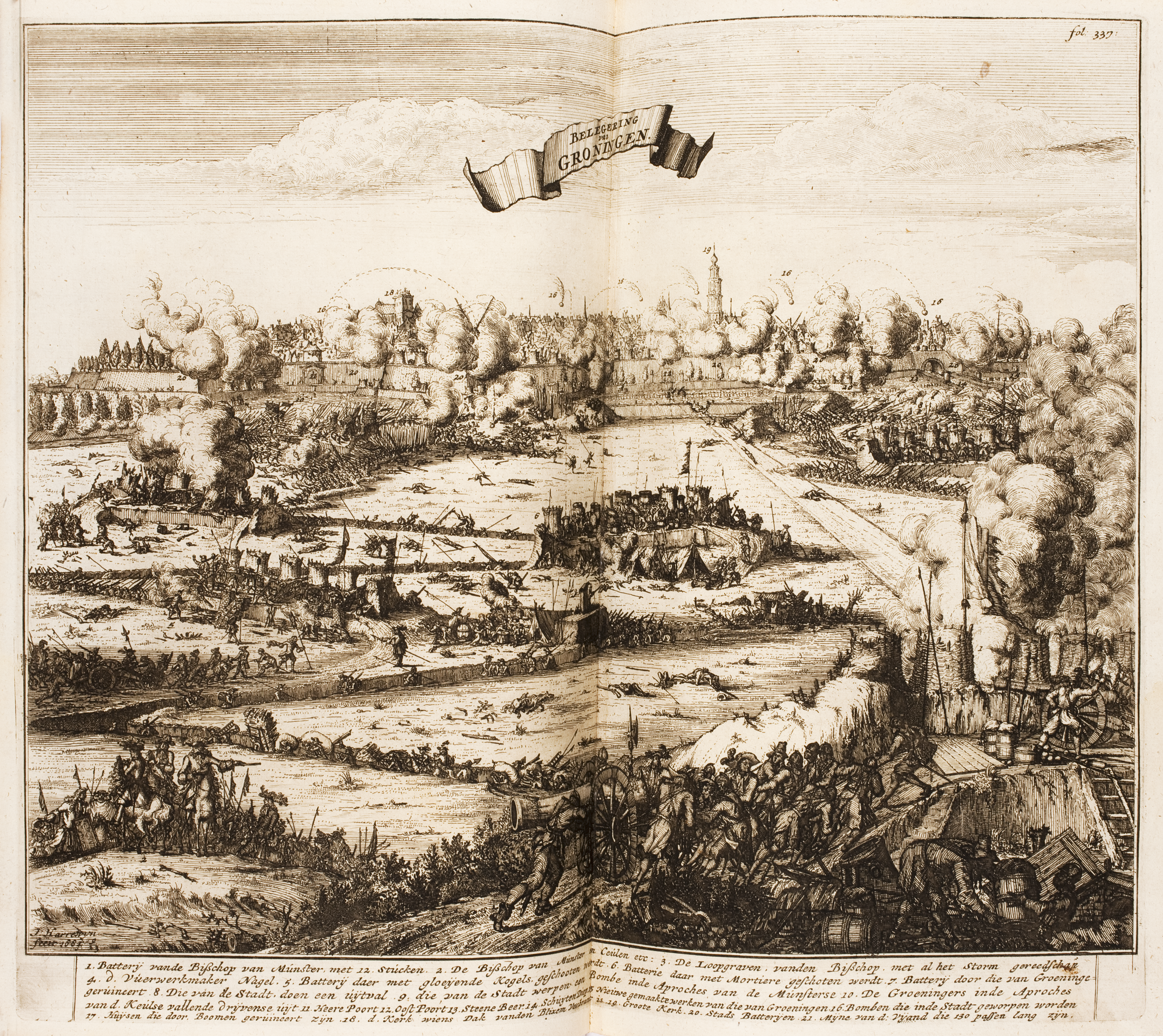
Depiction of the siege of Groningen

The siege started on 21 July, the city was well prepared compared to the other cities that Bernhard previously captured. The city was defended by a garrison of 2,500 men under Carl von Rabenhaupt. On 26 July, the Münsterite forces carried out their first bombardments of the city, these bombardment would earn Bernhard the nickname 'Bommen Berend'. For weeks, the Münsterite forces tried to unsuccessfully bombard the city, but to no avail. Eventually, on 27 August, Bernhard had to retreat due to their men starving and a guerilla campaign in Friesland carried out by Hans Willem van Aylva against their supplies.

And because Friesland was saved after the siege, this would also mean that the trade route of Amsterdam would also be saved. Because if Friesland were to fall into the hands of Bernhard von Galen, that would mean that the trade route would be endangered. Because it revolved around the Zuiderzee.

=== After the siege of Groningen ===
Shortly after the siege of Groningen, Hans Willem van Aylva would try to attack and capture the occupied fort of Kuinre with 1200 soldiers and armed civilians, but that failed. Bernhard von Galen would later launch an attack on Heerenveen in Friesland, which was defended by the now elderly John Maurice of Nassau-Siegen, Hans Willem van Aylva, Carl von Rabenhaupt and Henry Casimir II. Between 8 and 9 September he would launch 3 offensives towards Heerenveen. All of them resulted in a failure for the Bishop's troops, which meant that Friesland was secured from Münsterite occupation.

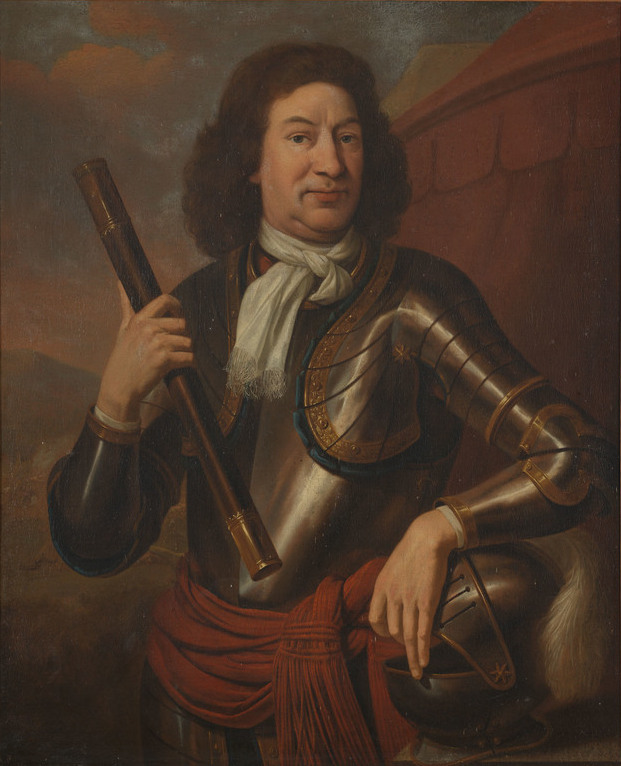
Portrait of Hans Willem van Aylva

Around the same time, Wedde would be recaptured by 8 September, and Oudeschans by 27 October by Carl von Rabenhaupt. And would recapture Coevorden shortly after with the help of Mijndert van der Thijnen. The recapture of Coevorden would also be a major event during this war, since the siege meant that the position of the war would shift towards the favour of the Dutch Republic. In January 1673, Bernhard von Galen sacked and plundered Cleves and Mark and met with Turenne near Wesel. Shortly after Raimondo Montecuccoli would start the negotiations with the Bishop in order to start their own conflict against France and her allies. Meanwhile John Maurice of Nassau-Siegen and Hans Willem van Aylva would defeat the Münsterite forces after an engagement near Staphorst, and would attack Zwartsluis shortly after, but that resulted in a failure.

On 22 July 1673, Nieuweschans would be reconquered by Carl von Rabenhaupt after a lengthy blockade, and would try to reconquer Steenwijk afterwards, though that ended in a failure. A few months later in October, Bernhard von Galen would appear before Coevorden again to try to recapture it, this attack ended in a failure along with him losing 1400 men. A few months later, in November. Dutch and German troops under Menno van Coehoorn and Raimondo Montecuccoli besieged and captured Bonn which lasted 7 days, this cut off the French supply lines which meant they could no longer supply their war in the Dutch Republic and had to retreat. In March 1674, Bernhard von Galen would plunder Windschoten and the surrounding areas again, and would launch a final attack on Groningen on 22 March. Shortly before the peace was finalized, Carl von Rabenhaupt invaded the territories of the Bishopric of Münster and captured Nordhorn with 3000 men on 1 April and Neuenhaus on 7 April. But had to retreat due to the peace treaty being signed between both parties.

== Aftermath ==
The second Münster War would be the last of Münsterite attempts of invading the Dutch Republic, along with Bernhard von Galen renouncing all claims in the Dutch Republic, along with the Electorate of Cologne, who also left the war. (Note: Bernhard von Galen claimed the Dutch held cities of Lingen, Bredevoort and Groenlo, but also Lichtenvoorde, Borculo, Westerwolde and Lingen.) This also meant that France lost two important allies that had helped them bypass the Spanish Netherlands and Dutch outposts in the south. This, along with Spain and the Holy Roman Empire joining the war against France, meant that the French army had to retreat out of the Dutch Republic, leaving only Maastricht under French occupation.

Bernhard von Galen would also betray his former French ally after leaving the war due to him fighting for coalition forces against Sweden during the Scanian War. (Note: See Bremen-Verden campaign.) The second Münster war also lead to the first international agreement regarding Chemical weapons, since Bernhard von Galen used many chemical weapons during the siege of Groningen, a few examples being Stink bombs and Grenades and poisoned bullets.

== Gallery ==
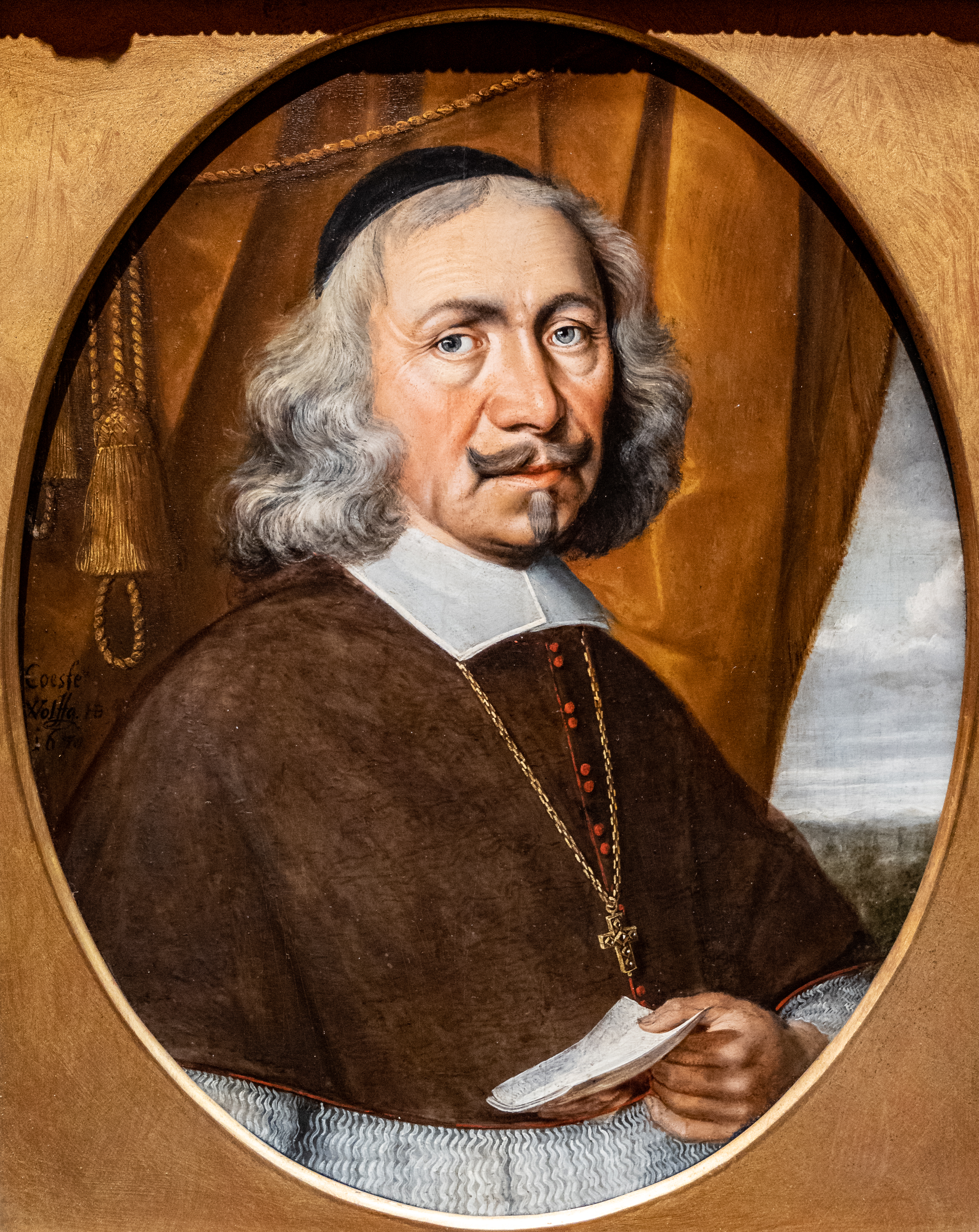
Portrait of Bernhard von Galen

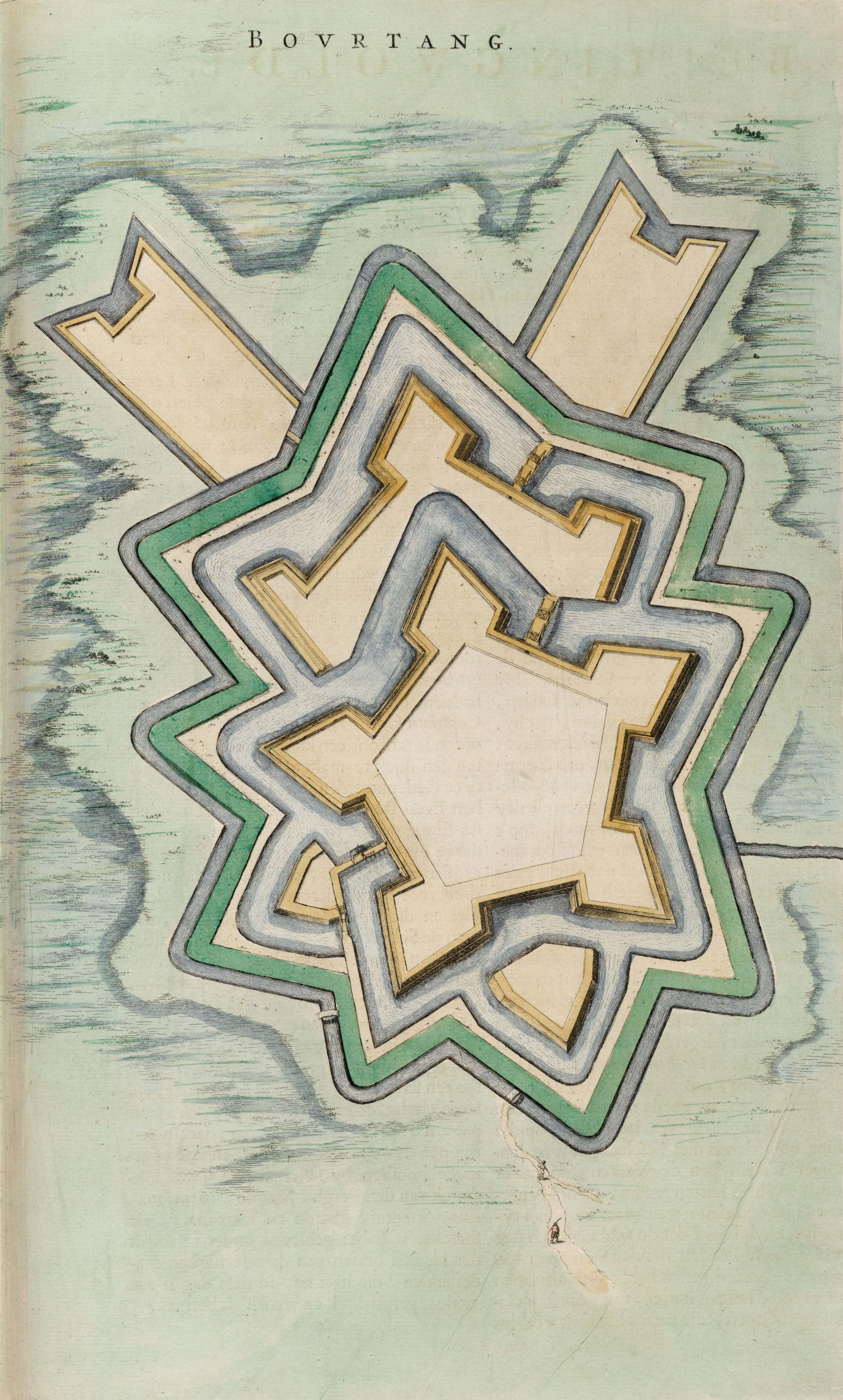
Fort Bourtange

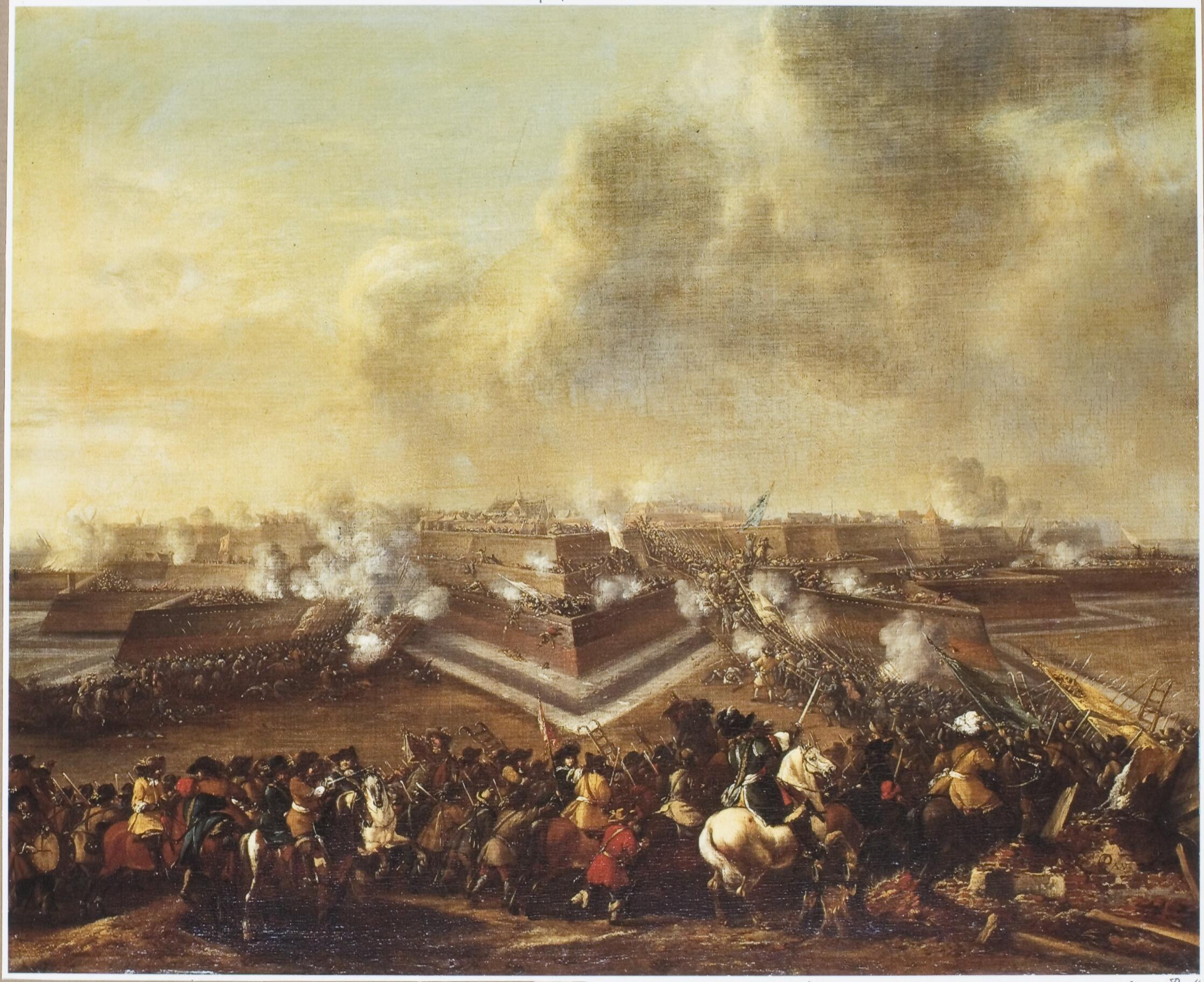
The siege of Coevorden

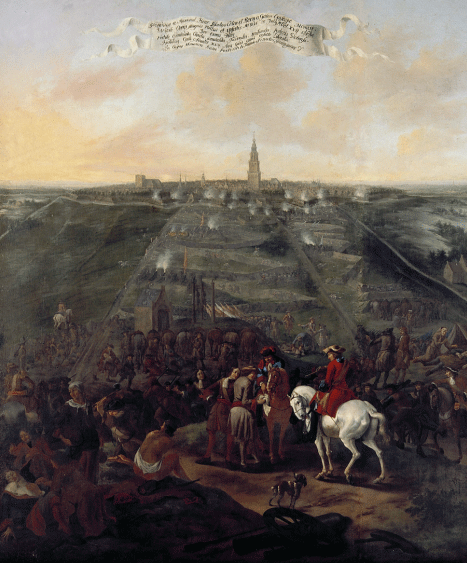
The siege of Groningen

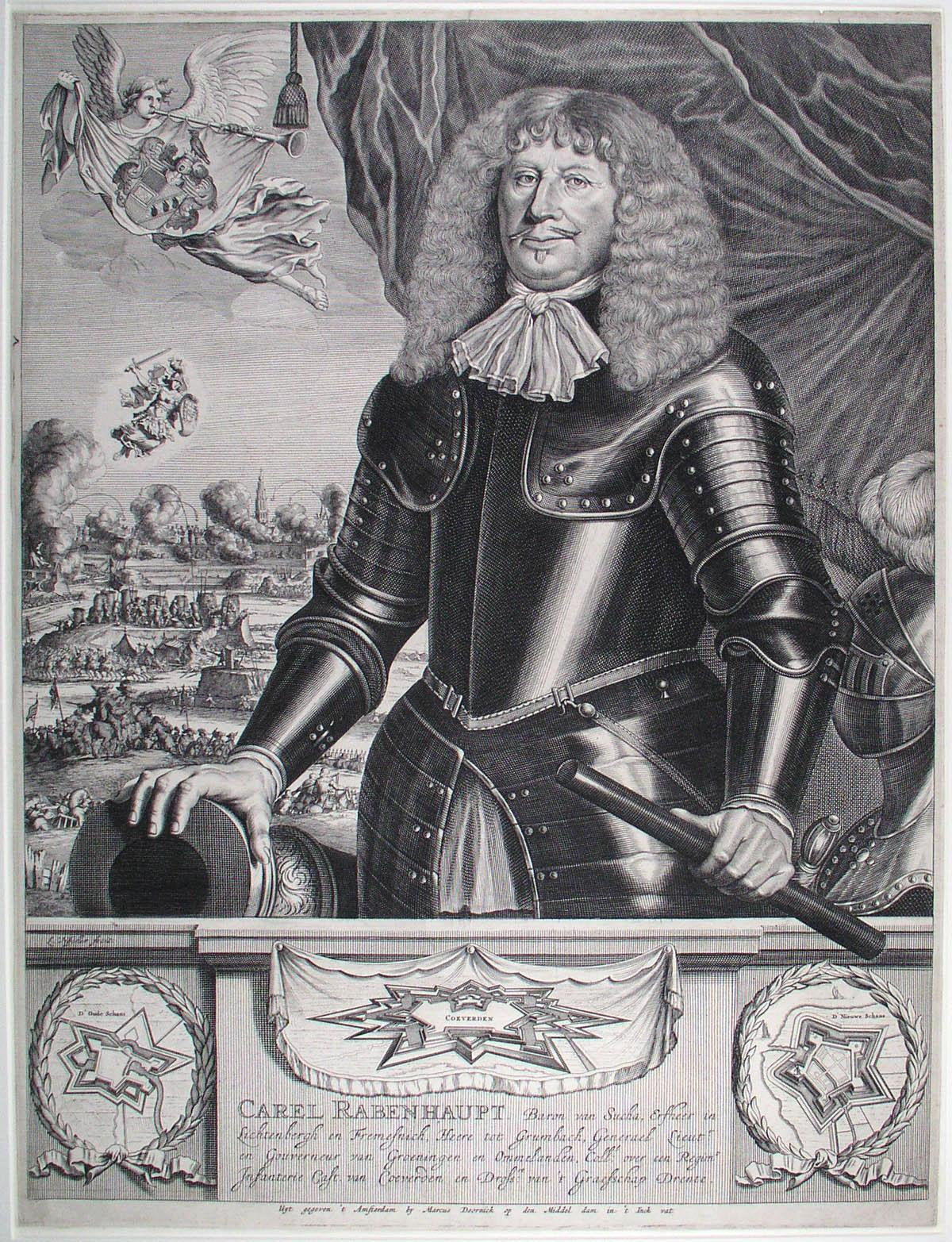
Carl von Rabenhaupt
