= Siege of Bredevoort (1672) =

1672 siege by Münster troops

- Part of the Franco-Dutch War and the Second Münster War
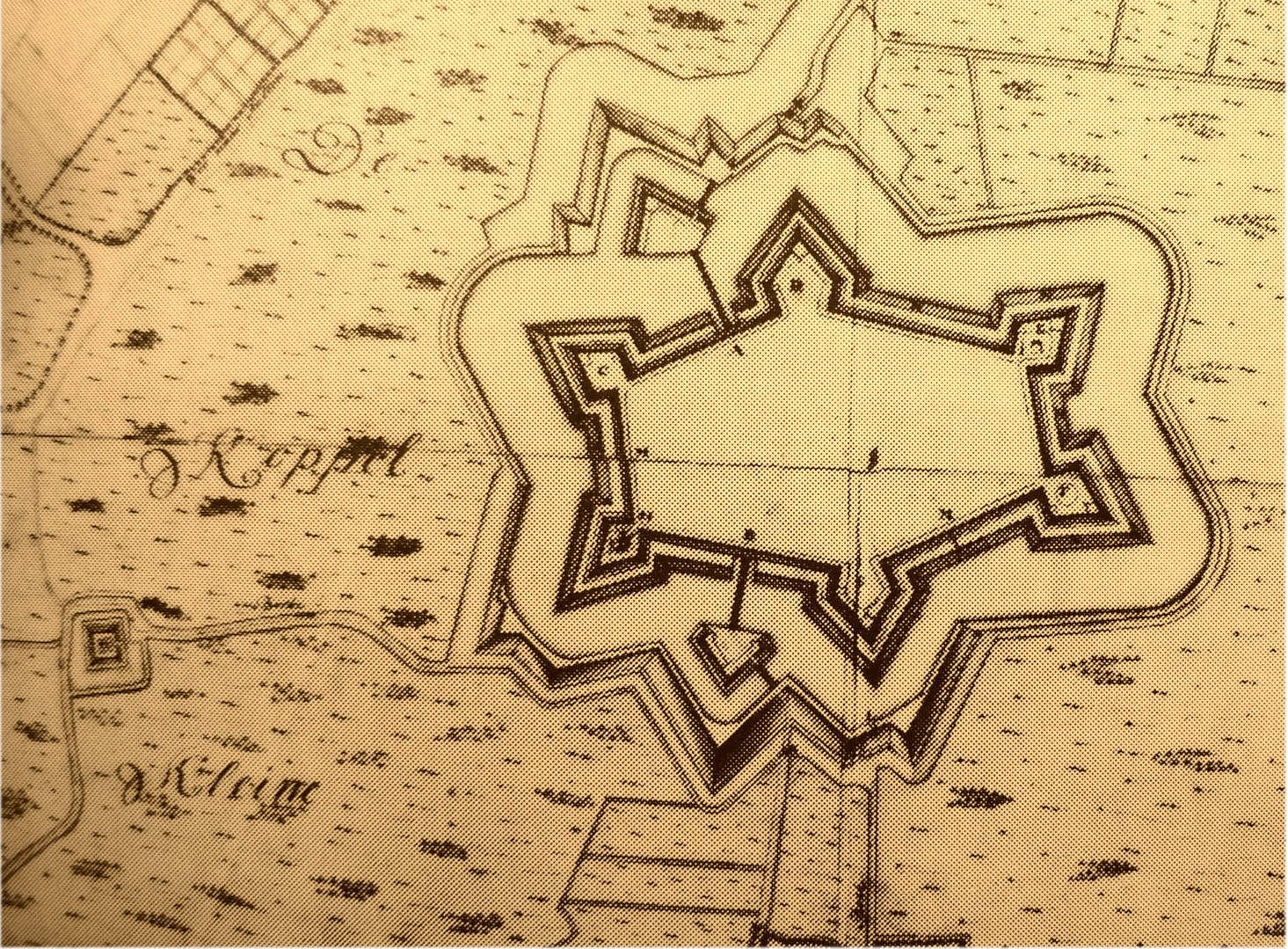
- Depiction of the fortress of Bredevoort
Date	12–18 June 1672
Location	Bredevoort, the Dutch Republic
Result	Münster victory

Belligerents
Dutch Republic	Bishopric of Münster

Commanders and leaders
(Dutch Republic) Adriaen van Keppel	Bernhard von Galen

Strength
500	2,000

Casualties and losses
Light	None

The siege of Bredevoort was a short siege by Münster troops, led by Bernhard von Galen to further initiate his invasion of the Dutch Republic. The siege itself lasted six days until the small garrison, led by Adriaen van Keppel was forced to surrender.

== Background ==
After signing the secret Treaty signed in Dover, Louis XIV managed to bribe Bernhard von Galen and Maximilian Henry of Bavaria to join his anti-Dutch coalition and to invade the Dutch Republic.

And after capturing the Dutch-held fortresses among the Rhine, the French forces under Louis, Grand Condé would defeat a small Dutch force at Tolhuis in order to cross the Rhine. The battle resulted in a French victory and allowed the French army to invade the Dutch Republic through Gelderland. However, Condé was wounded in action and subsequently had to give up his title as supreme commander to Turenne, who would split the army in order to besiege and capture Doesburg and Nijmegen.

Bernhard von Galen and Maximilian Henry would also take action and would capture and occupy Lingen and would invade Overijssel through Overdinkel and join French forces in besieging Groenlo, capturing the town after a siege that lasted 6 days.

== Siege ==
Bernhard von Galen arrived before the city with a force of 2,000 men. The fortress was surrounded by swamps, which made it difficult to invest in the forticifactions. The fortress had a garrison of 500 men led by Adriaen van Keppel. Just like in Groenlo, Bernhard von Galen would use grenades and artillery for his sieges, as these bombardments caused confusion and panic among the population. The women surrendered and fled the city, even though Bernhard von Galen didn't even begin to surround the city and no one had been wounded. The confusion and panic spread throughout the city, causing defenders to abandon their weapons. This ultimately led to the defeat of the Dutch forces when the city surrendered on 18 June, leaving it in the hands of Bernhard von Galen.

The siege would be regarded as a 'weird' or 'odd' siege, because it did not entirely follow the rules of war.

== Aftermath ==
After the siege, Bernhard von Galen would capture the cities of Deventer on 21 June and Zwolle shortly after on 22 June. The capture of these cities would allow him to advance his troops into the Northern provinces in which he would capture Coevorden after a siege and quickly overrun Drenthe and a large part of Groningen.

Bernhard von Galen's success would eventually meet an end after his unsuccessful siege of Groningen, which marked a turning point of his war against the Dutch Republic in which he was forced out of the war a few months after the England left the war and forced Bernhard von Galen to renounce his claims of potentially annexing Groenlo, Bredevoort and Lingen.

== Sources ==
- Fruin, Robert (1972). De oorlog van 1672 (E-book ed.). Wolters-Noordhof. ISBN 9789001324155.
- Roorda, D.J (1971). Het rampjaar 1672. Fibula-Van Dishoeck, Bussum. ISBN 9022830640.
- Israel, Jonathan (1995). The Dutch Republic: Its Rise, Greatness, and Fall. Oxford: Clarendon Press. ISBN 0-19-873072-1.
- Staring Instituut (1988). Bredevoort, een heerlijkeheid. Stichting 800 Jaar Veste Bredevoort. ISBN 9789090021355.
- Panhuysen, Luc (2009). Rampjaar 1672: Hoe de Republiek aan de ondergang ontsnapte. Uitgeverij Atlas. ISBN 9789045013282.
