= First Münster War =

Conflict part of the Second Anglo-Dutch War

- Part of the Second Anglo-Dutch War
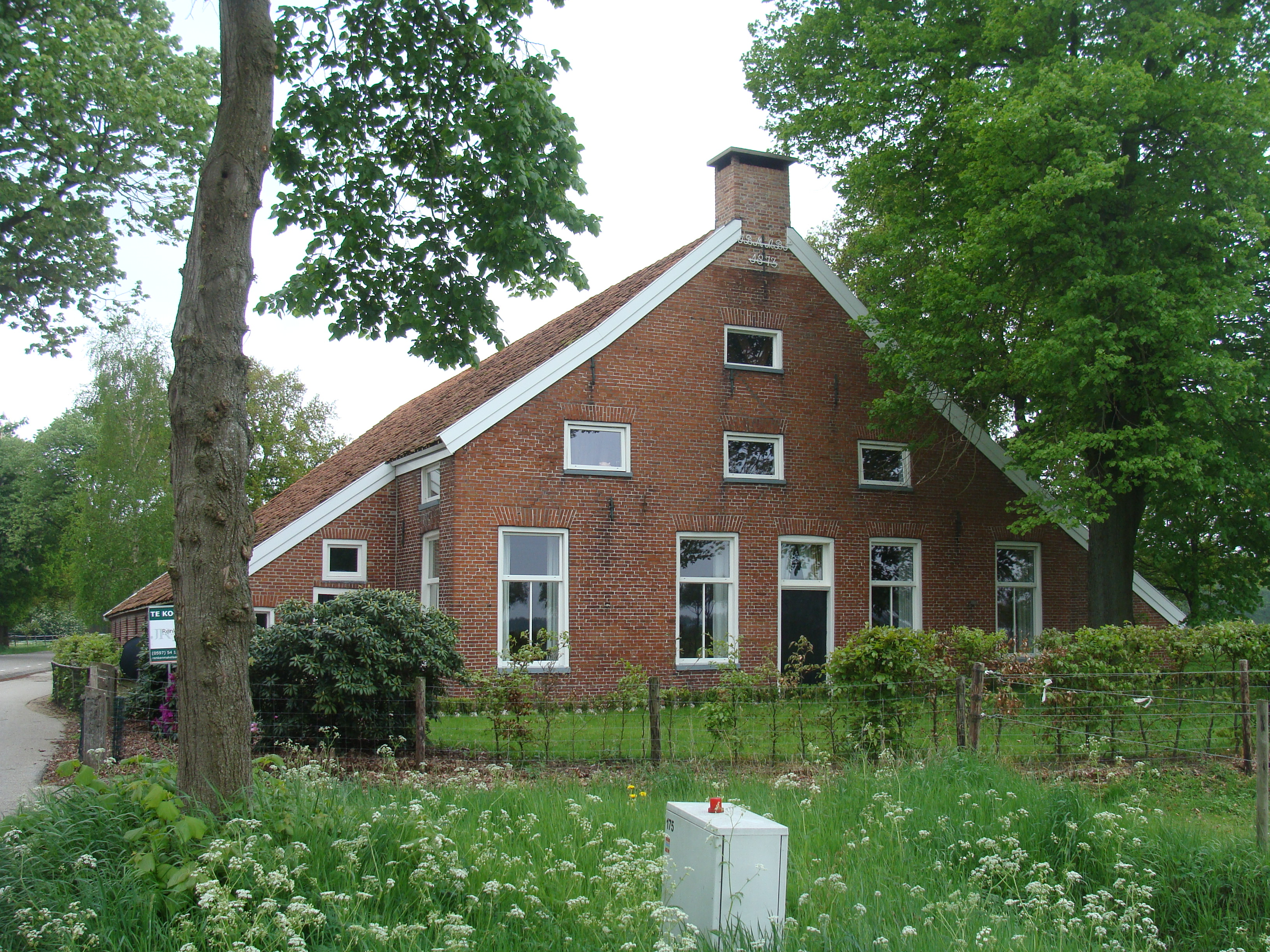
- Jipsinghuizen was the location of the most important battle of the war
Date	23 September 1665 – 18 April 1666
Location	The Eastern and Northern Netherlands
Result	Treaty of Kleve (1666)

Belligerents
Dutch Republic	Bishopric of Münster

Commanders and leaders
(Dutch Republic) John Maurice of Nassau-Siegen	Bernhard von Galen; George Christian of Hesse-Homburg

Strength
53,000 men (Note: This was the strength of the Dutch army on paper, but in the Eastern and Northern provinces alone it was most likely lower.); 6,000 French auxiliary troops	18,000–20,000

The First Münster War was a short conflict between the Dutch Republic against the Bishopric of Münster, who was supported by England. (Note: Although England was not a participant of this war. The Second Anglo-Dutch War was a related conflict and sent finances to the Bishop of Münster.) The Second Anglo-Dutch War is considered a related conflict.

== Background ==
In 1664, the English and Dutch found themselves fighting a war. The war began with the Battle of Lowestoft on 13 June which would be one of the most disastrous naval defeats in Dutch maritime history.

In July Michiel de Ruyter became the commander in chief of the Dutch states navy, and reorganized the line battle formation. This was followed by the Dutch spice fleet successfully returning home after the Dutch fleet fought the Battle of Vågen with the help of Norway.

Johan de Witt and the States General sought to prevent the Bishopric of Münster from joining the war on the side of England. Afterwards, Bernhard von Galen managed to drive the Dutch from the Dijlerschans, which was garrisoned under the count of East Frisia. In May, Dutch forces under Henry Casimir II recaptured the fort after invading Münsterite territory. In September, Bernhard von Galen demanded that the Dutch restitute the Lordship of Borculo, and when receiving no response, Bernhard declared war.

== War ==
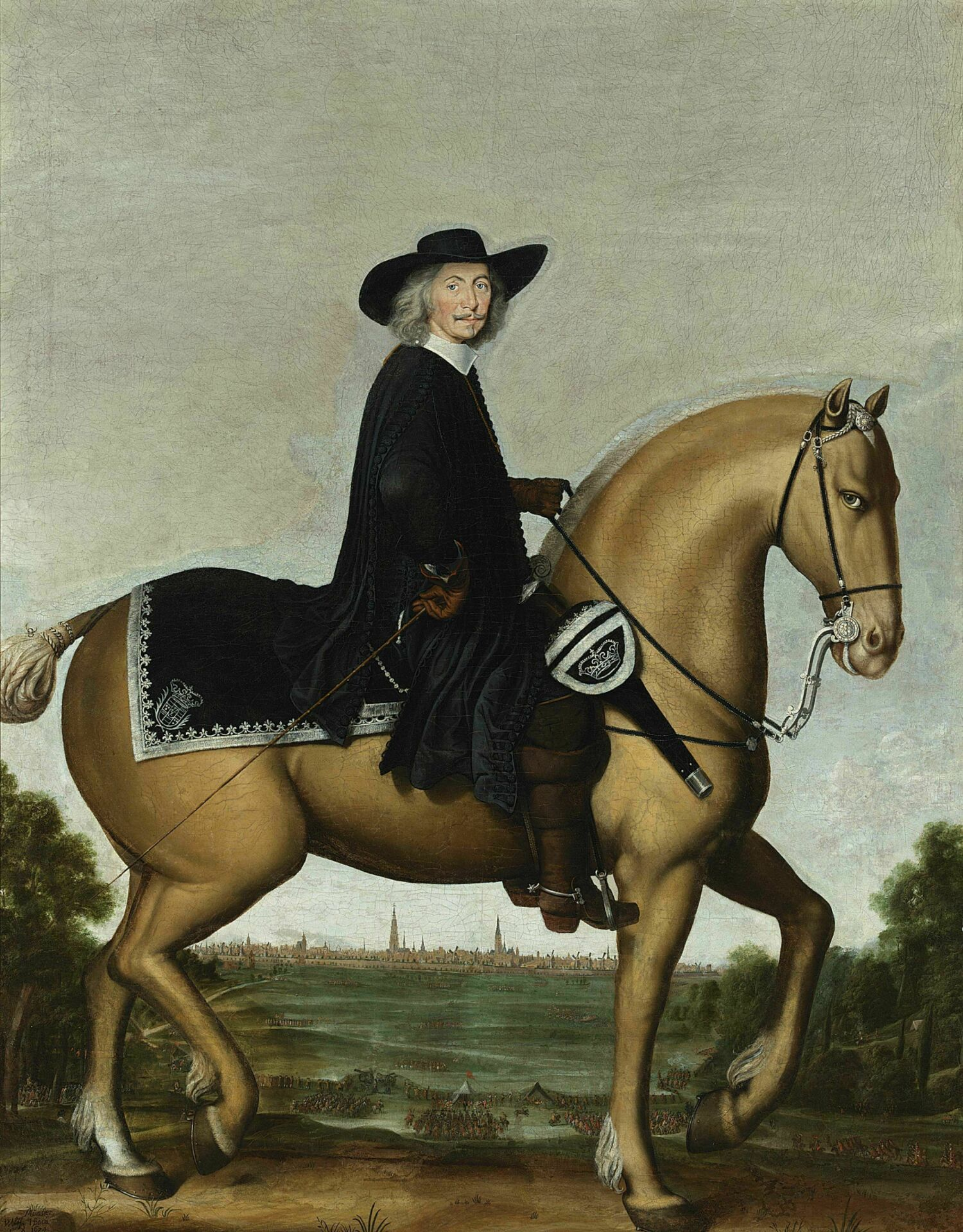
Portrait of Christoph Bernhard von Galen

Bernhard von Galen began his offensives on 23 September 1665 after signing a treaty with Henry Bennet, the then Earl of Arlington, which meant that he was now backed by English funding. And invaded the Gelderland and Overijssel with an army of 18.000-20.000 men. Bernhard von Galen along with George Christian of Hesse-Homburg invaded and captured Oldenzaal, Almelo and Enschede by 25 September. Borculo fell on 29 September. And Bredevoort and Lochem on 1 October. Most of the Achterhoek had been already conquered by the Bishop and other parts of Overijssel would soon follow.

The Dutch states army, under the command of the elderly John Maurice of Nassau-Siegen would retreat to the rear of the Ijssel line. The incapability of the states army sparked controversy and criticism in the Republic towards the Dutch States Party, especially towards Johan's brother, Cornelis de Witt due to him being one of the field deputies. And the question about who should command the army and the organization of the army quickly arose. After that, the Münsterite forces quickly overran Drenthe. During the Münsterite occupation of these cities and towns, most of it would be looted, sacked or plundered. Shortly afterwards, Bernhard von Galen had to retreat to the Ommen. Because he saw that the Ommerschans could not be captured by his army. Instead, he would invade Drenthe through Rouveen and Staphorst, and would march towards Windschoten and Wedde. Through Ootmaarsum, Bernhard von Galen would march towards the Emsland to invade the Oldambt in Groningen. The inhabitants of Jipsinghuizen would then flee and take refuge in other parts of the country. A garrison of 1.800 men would also be stationed in Jipsinghuizen to await the rest of the army that would arrive soon, the city of Groningen would send an additional army of 500-600 men. The Dutch forces led by Willem Nierop attacked the Münsterite army on the 26th of September, which resulted in 300 Münsterite losses.

By that point, much the Dutch Republic was in panic, especially Groningen which was threatened by the Bishop's troops. Though by that time Rudolph Augustus the Duke of Brünswick-Wolfenbüttel offered military assistance to the Dutch Republic by attacking Münster to relieve the Dutch Republic, along with Frederick William of Brandenburg who even offered mediation. Along with a French auxiliary force, which consisted of 6.000 men. After trying, a plan of invading and capturing Willemstad, Oudenbosch and Bergen op Zoom by Bernhard von Galen for a potential English landing would be cancelled. Afterwards, the Dutch commander John Maurice of Nassau-Siegen would march towards Bocholt, Bernhard von Galen, seeing that Münster was now threatened had to retreat. Negotiations were held in Kleve with Frederick William of Brandenburg as a mediator between the two.

== Aftermath ==
On 18 April 1666 the Treaty of Kleve was signed after the English stopped their funding of Bernhard's army, in which Bernhard von Galen was forced to accept humiliating terms. The terms were that he had to reduce his army to 3000 men, and had to renounce his claim to the Lordship of Borculo, in return for 'Eternal peace'. Even though the war was considered to be an "incident" in the Dutch Republic, it did show that the Dutch states army had a lack of fighting power. Though the 'Eternal peace' between the Bishop and the Dutch Republic did not last, because Bernhard von Galen would try to invade the Dutch Republic again a few years later.
