= Siege of Groningen =

The siege of Groningen may refer to one of several sieges:

- Siege of Groningen (1568) by Calvinist forces during the Eighty Years' War of 1568–1648
- Siege of Groningen (1580) by republican forces during the Eighty Years' War of 1568–1648
- Siege of Groningen (1594) by Dutch forces during the Eighty Years' War of 1568–1648
- Siege of Groningen (1672) by Prince-Bishopric forces of Münster during the Franco-Dutch War of 1672–1678
