= Hans Willem van Aylva =

Dutch military officer

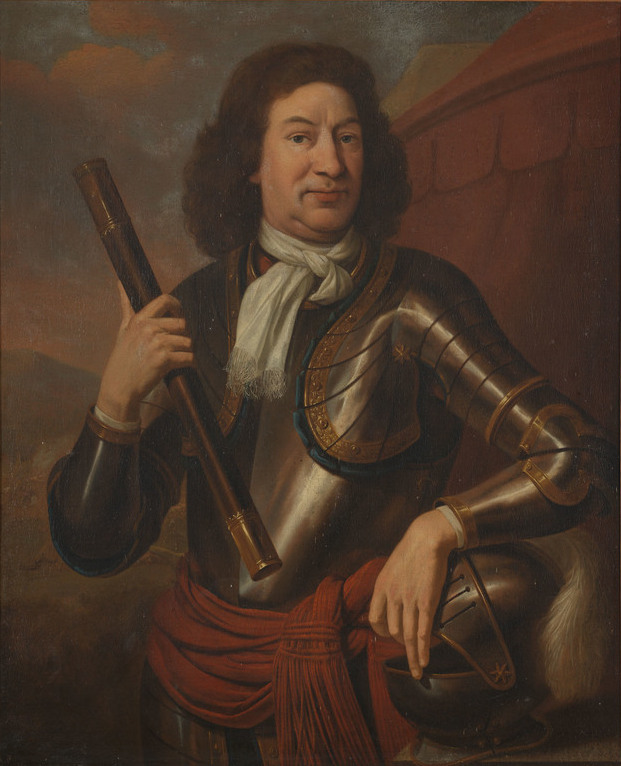
- Born: 1633 Holwerd, Dutch Republic
- Died: 21 February 1691 (aged 57–58) Near Leuven, Spanish Netherlands
- Allegiance: Dutch Republic
- Rank: Lieutenant admiral
- Conflicts: Second Anglo-Dutch War; Raid on the Medway; Third Anglo-Dutch War; Franco-Dutch War; Battle of Tolhuis; Siege of Groningen; Assault on Kuinre; Battle of Heerenveen; Battle of Staphorst; Battle of Zwartsluis; Battle of Seneffe; Nine Years' War; Siege of Kaiserswerth; Battle of Walcourt; Siege of Bonn; Battle of Fleurus

Hans Willem van Aylva (c. 1633 – 21 February 1691) was a Dutch military officer.

== Raid on the Medway and Franco-Dutch War ==
In 1667 he participated in the Dutch Raid on Medway, as commander of the Frisian squadron. He was appointed a major general in 1668 and promoted to lieutenant general four years later. In 1672, at the start of the Franco-Dutch War after Prince William III's appointment as captain general, he was again appointed lieutenant general of infantry and charged with the defence of Friesland. Aylva waged a kind of guerrilla war in the surroundings of Heerenveen; with a small force and his Frisian militias, he had hastily put Friesland in a state of defence by raising earthen entrenchments on the south-east side, forming a line from Kuinre along Heerenveen to Groningen. In July 1672, he led an unsuccessful attack with 1200 soldiers and civilians on Kuinre, where the troops of the Bishop of Munster had gathered much booty. Already 200 enemies had been shot down, and that place would undoubtedly have been conquered, if the Bishop had not obtained a hasty release of 2000 men from Kampen and Zwolle. The Frisians retreated again, losing 30 men in total. On 27 August the Bishop had to abandon the Siege of Groningen. Whereas the Dutch had managed to supply the city through waterways at its northern edge, Von Galen's troops were starving and had largely deserted. Largely due to an effective guerrilla campaign by troops from Friesland under Hans Willem van Aylva against their supply lines.

In the night between 8 and 9 September, the Bishop's troops attacked the Heerenveen entrenchment three times, but were beaten off every time, even though the entrenchment was sparsely manned. Around that time, or perhaps even earlier, Aylva was camped with some companies not far from the Blesse bridge, which enters Friesland from Overijssel, when one day a French marquis came riding across the bridge, talking loudly, as if he wanted to indicate that, since they had already conquered Overijssel, it was now Friesland's turn; This hurt the pride of the "Awesome General", as his Frisian compatriots called him. He therefore rode against the Frenchman and knocked him out of the saddle with a pistol shot.

At the beginning of 1673, together with John Maurice, Ayvla successfully fought the Munster troops of the Count of Lippe, among others near Staphorst in a fierce encounter; an attack against Zwartsluis in July of the same year, under the same commanders, failed. In August, when the Bishop of Munster advanced from Steenwijk on Friesland to conquer it, John Maurice informed Aylva, who was then in command at Wolvega, whereupon he went to Heerenveen. Several battles were fought, in which the enemy troops were repeatedly beaten. The troops of the Bishop made every effort to overrun Heerenveen, but they were stopped every time and could do nothing but plunder the defenceless countrymen, until on 1 September they were forced to retreat, without having accomplished anything of importance. Aylva had, through policy and vigilance, helped to secure Friesland against every attack of the enemy. When the front shifted from the Dutch Republic to the Spanish Netherlands, Ayvla took part, on 11 August 1674, in the Battle of Seneffe, leading the infantry of the right wing, on which occasion he was severely wounded.

== Nine Years' War ==
Following the outbreak of the Nine Years War, he commanded a small Dutch army that took part in early operations around Cologne, where he co-operated with German forces under Hans Adam von Schöning. Troops of Brandenburg and troops of the States captured Kaiserswerth and Neuss from the French, while Bonn fell in October after a bloody siege. At the Battle of Walcourt (1689), he led a mixed force of English and Dutch soldiers against the French left flank. The French reeled back in disarray but valuable service by the French cavalry, commanded by Colonel Villars, prevented the retreat from becoming a rout, allowing Humières to extricate his men from the field.

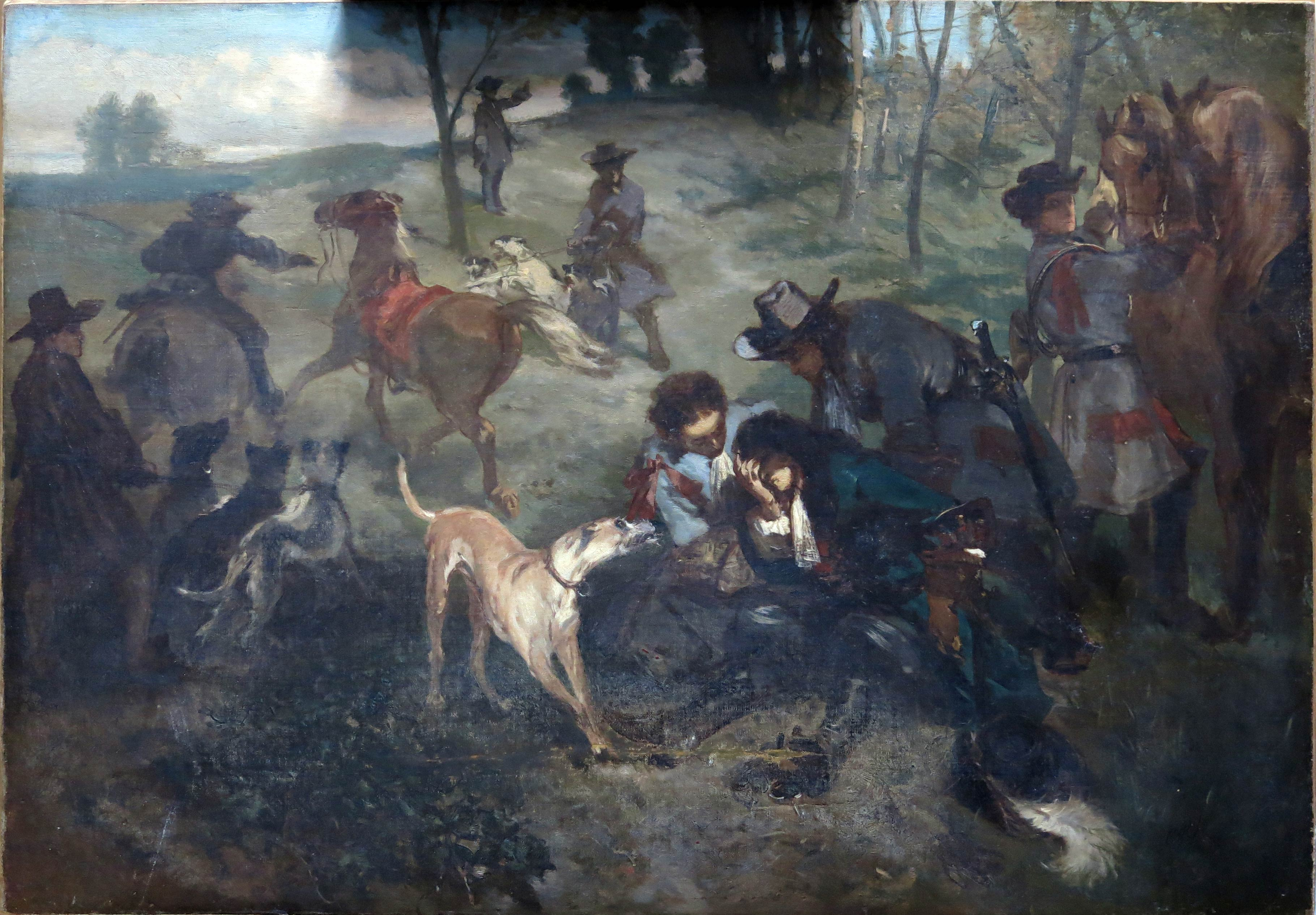
The death of general Hans Willem van Aylva

Aylva's last feat of arms was his brave conduct in the Battle of Fleurus, on 1 July 1690. Here, too, he showed his boldness and usual precautions. He was part of the large infantry square, which, although under attack from a superior force, stood its ground heroically, so that the Duke of Luxembourg, the French commander, discouraged by the many fruitless attempts to penetrate, finally held back and had to see nine regiments, led by the Count of Waldeck and Aylva, calmly retreat over the heights of Mellé to the side of Nivelles.

In the year 1691, Aylva commanded the armed forces of the Dutch Republic in Brabant, and had his quarters in Leuven. When he was on the hunt, his horse reared up and threw his rider to the ground; he hurt his head, which at first was thought to be of little importance, but subsequently caused him a fever, with such seizures that he died a few days later. His body was embalmed and transported to Friesland, and transferred to his parents' family grave in Holwerd.

== Bibliography ==
- Childs, J. (1991). The Nine Years' War and the British Army, 1688–97. Manchester University Press.
- Van Nimwegen, Olaf (2020). De Veertigjarige Oorlog 1672–1712: de strijd van de Nederlanders tegen de Zonnekoning [The 40 Years' War 1672–1712: the Dutch struggle against the Sun King] (in Dutch). Prometheus. ISBN 978-90-446-3871-4.
- Panhuysen, Luc (2009). Rampjaar 1672: Hoe de Republiek aan de ondergang ontsnapte. Uitgeverij Atlas. ISBN 9789045013282.
- Van der Aa, Abraham Jacob (1852). "Hans Willem van Aylva". Biographisch woordenboek der Nederlanden. Deel 1.
- Blok, P.J.; Molhuysen, P.C. (1911). "Aylva, Hans Willem baron van (1)". Nieuw Nederlandsch biografisch woordenboek. Deel 1.
