= Jipsinghuizen =

- Hamlet
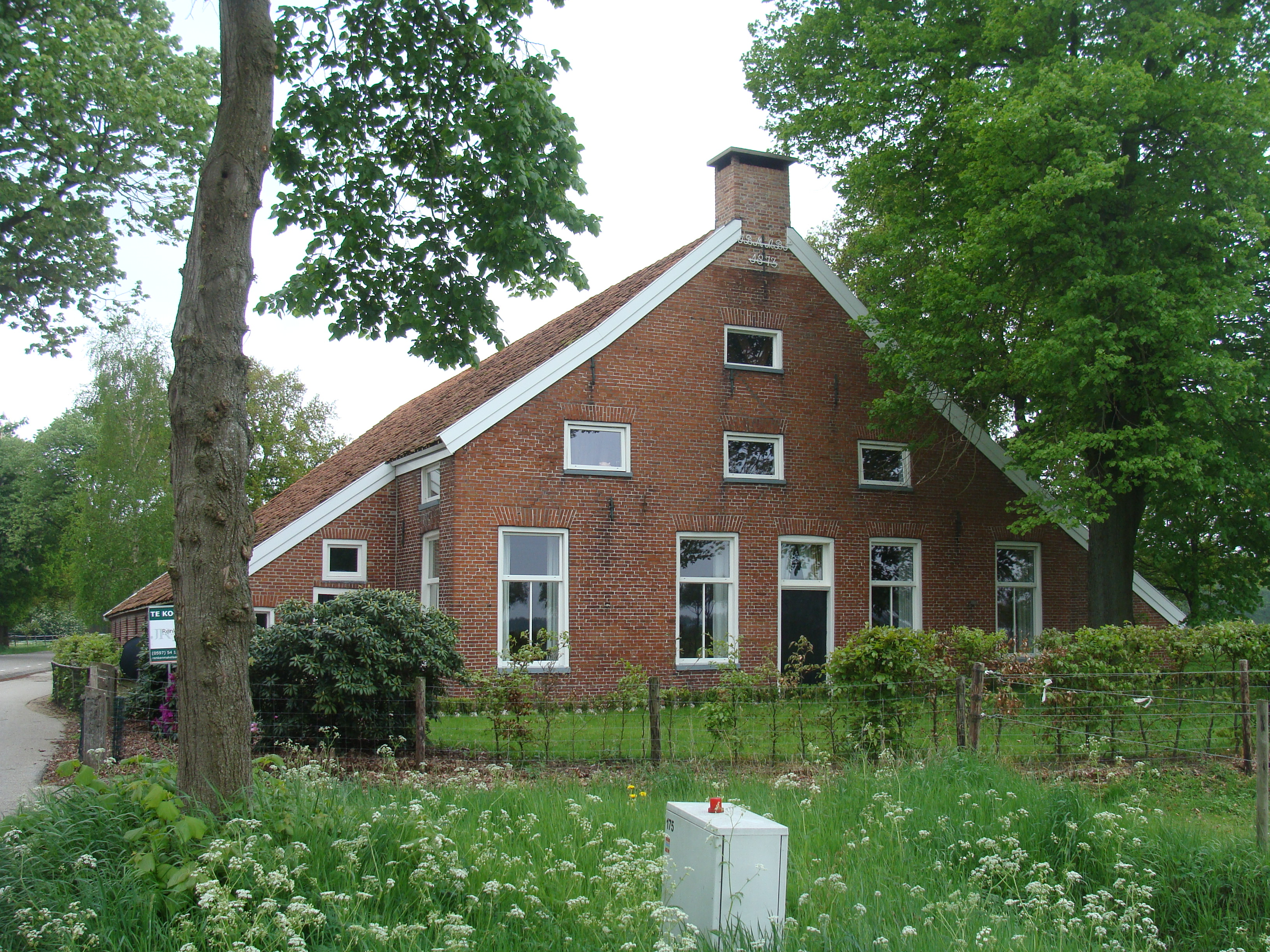

- Location in the province of Groningen in the Netherlands Jipsinghuizen (Netherlands)
- Coordinates: 52°58′37″N 7°8′59″E
- Country: Netherlands
- Province: Groningen
- Municipality: Westerwolde

Area
  - Total: 0.45 km^{2} (0.17 sq mi)

Population (2021)
  - Total: 150
  - Density: 330/km^{2} (860/sq mi)
- Time zone: UTC+1 (CET)
  - Summer (DST): UTC+2 (CEST)
- Postal code: 9551
- Dialing code: 0599

Jipsinghuizen (Dutch pronunciation: [ˌjɪpsɪŋˈɦœyzə(n)]; Gronings: Jipsenhoezen [ˌjɪpsn̩ˈɦuːzn̩]) is a hamlet in the Dutch province of Groningen. It is a part of the municipality of Westerwolde, and lies about 28 km northeast of Emmen. The statistical area "Jipsinghuizen", which also can include the surrounding countryside, has a population of around 150. Jipsinghuizen used to be part of the municipality of Vlagtwedde, but merged into Westerwolde in 2017. In 1665, the Battle of Jipsinghuizen was fought between Münster and the Dutch Republic.

== Battle of Jipsinghuizen ==
In 1665, Christoph Bernhard von Galen, the bishop of Münster, secretly constructed a road from Walchum, Lower Saxony to Sellingen, Groningen through the moor as part of a planned invasion of Groningen. The population panicked and fled, and von Galen took Sellingen on 20 September. 1,800 men were stationed at Jipsinghuizen, to await the arrival of the remainder of the army. The city of Groningen was alarmed and an army of 500 to 600 soldiers was dispatched to the region.

In the early morning of 26 September, the troops led by Willem Nierop attacked. About 300 soldiers of Münster were killed, and the remainder fled back to Walchum. Later, Münster managed to take Westerwolde via Drenthe and Oldambt, but was attacked by the Dutch States Army under command of John Maurice of Nassau-Siegen.

On 18 April 1666, von Galen was forced to accept the treaty of Kleve, a humiliating peace treaty drawn up by Frederick William of Brandenburg. Münster promised eternal peace, the return of all conquered territories and in particular Borculo, and a reduction of its army to 3,000 men. The eternal peace did not last, and von Galen returned in 1672.
