= Siege of Coevorden (1672) =

Siege during the Second Münster War

- Part of the Franco-Dutch War and the Second Münster War
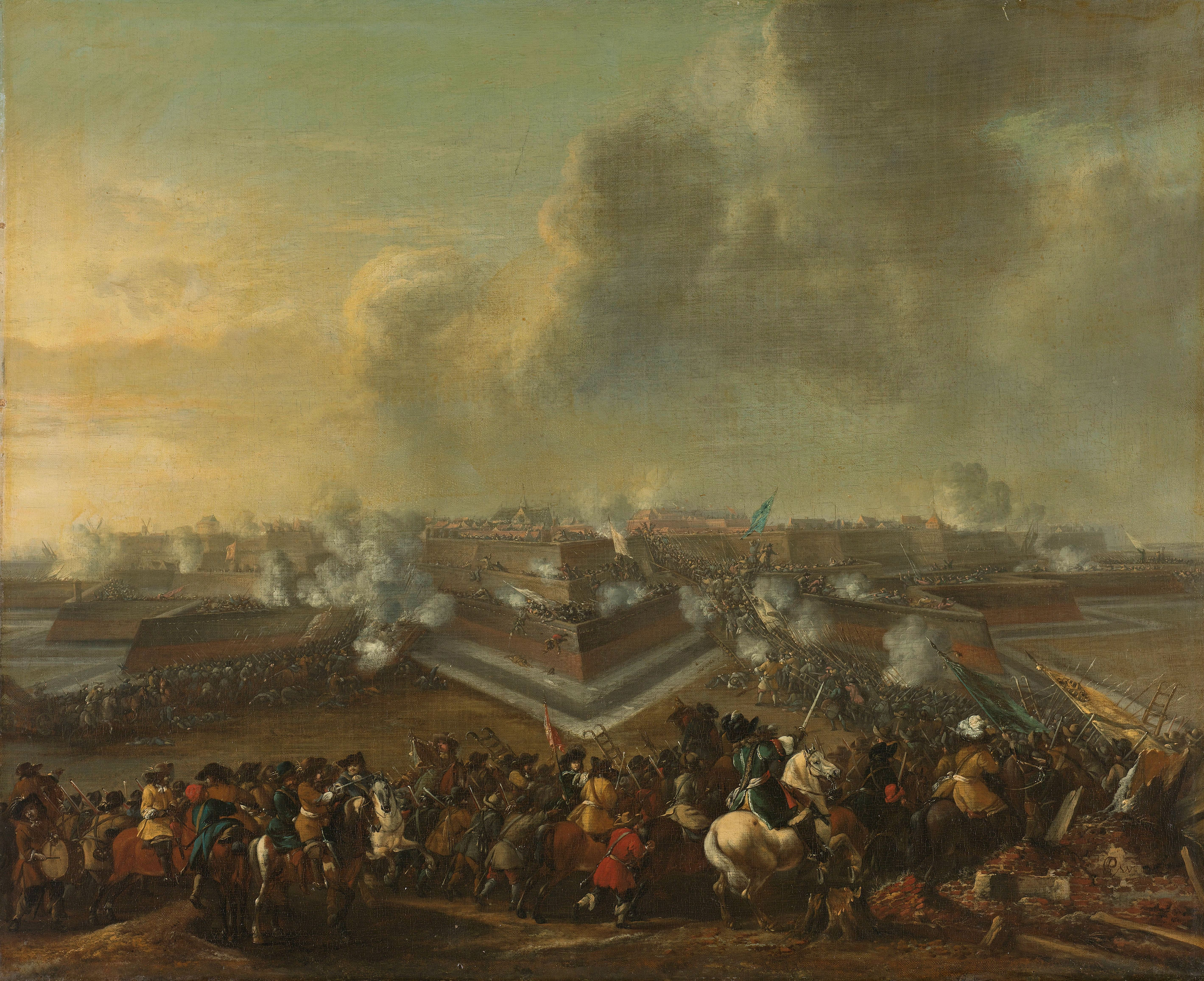
- The storming of Coevorden, by Pieter Wouweman
Date	First siege: 1–11 July 1672; Second siege: 29–30 December 1672
Location	Coevorden, the Netherlands
Result	First siege: Münster victory Second siege: Dutch victory

Belligerents
Dutch Republic	Münster

Commanders and leaders
(Dutch Republic) Carl von Rabenhaupt	Bernhard von Galen

Strength
Unknown	First siege: 24,000 men Second siege: Unknown

The sieges of Coevorden were two separate sieges of the city of Coevorden located in Drenthe in the Netherlands. The first siege was launched for Bernhard von Galen to make further progress in his conquests in the Eastern and Northern Netherlands, and the second on with the intention to recapture the city as an aftermath of the siege of Groningen.

== First siege ==
After conquering most of the provinces of Overijssel and Gelderland, Bernhard von Galen had to make a choice between attacking the city of Coevorden or to invade Friesland. But his decision was quickly made and decided to attack and try to capture Coevorden instead.

He arrived before Coevorden on 1 July, and started investing in its defences and digging their trenches around the fortress on 4 July. And on 6 July, the Münsterite troops started bombarding the city, in which the first sign of surrender had been shown. A day later the Münster forces started to bombard the city again with artillery and grenades, that caused a massive amounts of fire in the city. The Münsterite troops started to assault the city, but without much success. However, the city would surrender 2 days later.

== Second siege ==
After the city was captured, the inhabitants of Coevorden would flee their homes and Bernhard von Galen would plunder the city with his troops. Among these refugees was a teacher known as Mijndert van der Thijnen. After fleeing with his family to Groningen, he collaborated with Carl von Rabenhaupt to develop a plan for recapturing Coevorden, in which he played a crucial role.

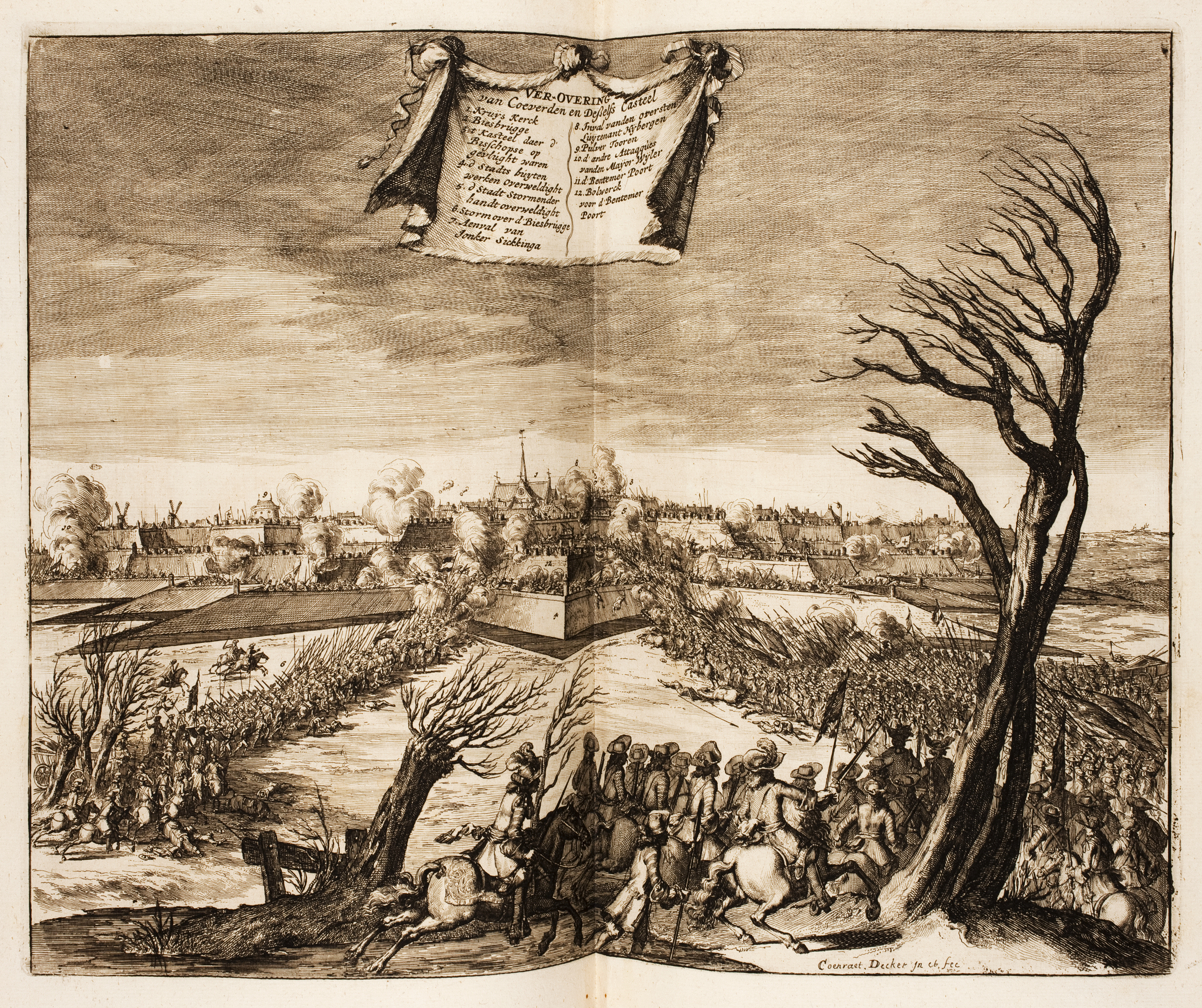
The storming of Coevorden

The Dutch forces marched towards Coevorden on 27 December, with 1000 men, just a few months after Carl von Rabenhaupt successfully defended Groningen. The city was not well defended by the troops of von Galen, because a garrison was considered too costly. Almost none of the cities that von Galen captured had been properly defended after its capture. The city of Coevorden had only a poorly equipped garrison of 600 men.

On 29 December, the Dutch army under Carl von Rabenhaupt would set up camps near the city. The next morning, with dense fog, the Dutch would attack on 3 sides. One on the side of the castle, the second on the side of the Bastion, and the third on the side of the gate. Short but fierce fighting took place near the Ramparts, which resulted in the Münsterite troops fleeing afterwards. All attacks on each side succeeded. And the city was recaptured in just 1 hour.

== Aftermath ==
The first siege would shatter Coevorden's reputation of being "invincible to capture". The siege would also be the height of Bernhard von Galen's campaign. And the capture of Coevorden allowed him to launch an invasion of Friesland and Groningen.

After the second siege, Carl von Rabenhaupt would be given the title of Drost of Drenthe. Commander van Eybergen would become the commander of the city, and van Thijnen would be given gold as reward. But Bernhard von Galen would return to the city just one year later and try to recapture it, but without success. The second siege marked a turning point when the war's momentum in the Northern and Eastern provinces shifted in favor of the Dutch Republic. The war between the Bishopric of Münster and the Dutch Republic ended in 1674 with the signing of the Treaty of Cologne.
