= Carl von Rabenhaupt =

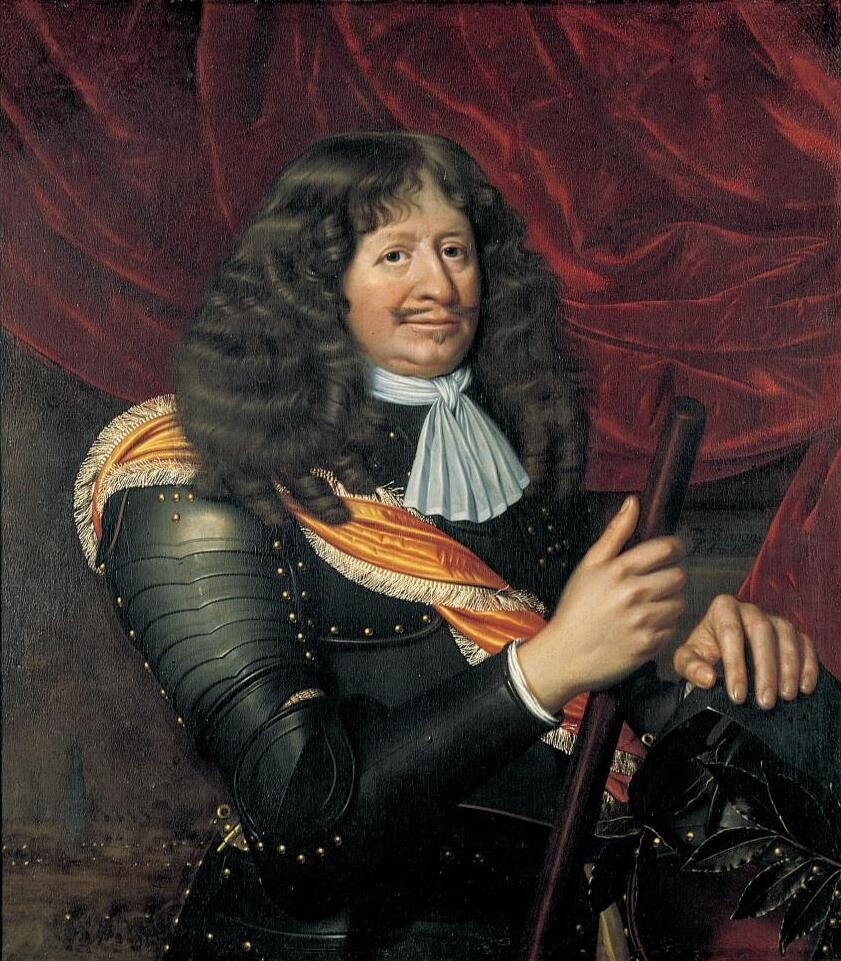
- Born: 6 January 1602; Bohemia
- Died: 12 August 1675 (aged 73); Coevorden
- Military career
- Service years: 1620–1648; 1671–1675
- Rank: Lieutenant general
- Battles: Thirty Years' War: Siege of Bautzen (1620) 1620; Siege of Bergen-op-Zoom (1622); Siege of Groenlo (1627); Capture of Maastricht (1632); Skirmish at Eschweiler (1644); Siege of Zons (1646); Capture of Vechta (1647); Siege of Paderborn (1647); Dutch War: Siege of Groningen (1672); Siege of Coevorden (1672); Siege of Coevorden (1673); Siege of Grave (1674)

Carl von Rabenhaupt (6 January 1602 – 12 August 1675) was a Bohemian Hussite nobleman who fought in Dutch and Hessian service during the Thirty Years War and came out of retirement to help the Dutch defend Groningen during the Franco-Dutch War. He made a name for himself as a siege specialist, taking or successfully defending many fortified cities along the Dutch-German border.

== Thirty Years War ==
A Bohemian Hussite, Rabenhaupt went into exile for his religion in 1620, after the failure of the Bohemian Revolt, and entered military service. First, he fought at the defence of Bautzen under the Duke of Jägerndorf against the Elector of Saxony. By 1622 he had followed Ernst von Mansfeld into Dutch service. Taking part in the sieges of Bergen-op-Zoom, Groenlo and Maastricht in the Low Countries, he established his reputation in siege warfare.

In 1633 he received an offer of service from William V, Landgrave of Hesse-Kassel. Transferring to Hessian service, he became governor of Rheine in Westphalia. He lost the city to imperial troops in 1634 while he was conquering Vreden and Bocholt with parts of the garrison. Afterwards, he served as commander of Steinfurt and Kalkar. In 1644, he defeated a Duchy of Lorraine force at the Rur (Roer) River near Eschweiler but was intercepted and captured on his way back to the Hessian stronghold Neuss by imperial troops under Christian von Nassau-Siegen. He was able to escape from prison and returned to Neuss to resume skirmishes with imperial troops.

Later in 1644, he occupied Xanten until Hessian regent Amalie Elisabeth handed it back to its ruler Frederick William of Brandenburg through Dutch mediation. A victorious skirmish at the Erft River in 1645 allowed Rabenhaupt to plunder the Upper Electorate of Cologne. He pushed forward into the Electorate but his siege of Zons in 1646 was relieved by the Imperials under Count Holzappel. In his next campaign in 1647, he was supported by Swedish troops under Hans Christoff von Königsmarck. Together they captured Vechta as well as Fürstenau, and besieged Paderborn. An imperial diversion under Guillaume de Lamboy to East Frisia forced them to lift the siege. Rabenhaupt recaptured Jemgum from the Imperials and returned to Hesse in the hope of becoming supreme commander of the Hessian forces. As the command was given to Johann von Geyso instead, Rabenhaupt retired from active service.

== Franco-Dutch War ==
After dedicating many years to science and religion on his estates in the Netherlands, Rabenhaupt was commissioned by the Dutch Republic in 1671 as colonel of his own regiment, and later promoted to lieutenant general. He was given command of the troops of Groningen and defended it against a siege in 1672 by Münster troops under Bishop von Galen. Following the Bishop's retreat on 28 August, Rabenhaupt recaptured Coevorden on 27 December. He became drost of Drenthe and governor of the fortress and held it against renewed attacks in 1673. He even pushed into the Bishopric's territory in 1674, taking Nordhorn and Neuenhaus until he was forced to retreat. Dutch peace treaties with Münster and Cologne ended the war on this front in spring 1674.

In July 1674, Rabenhaupt started to invest the French occupied Grave. His force was only strong enough to fully besiege the town when Brandenburg troops reinforced him in August. The garrison under Noël Bouton de Chamilly inflicted heavy casualties on the besiegers and only capitulated on 27 October to Rabenhaupt and Stadtholder William of Orange.

Following the victorious siege, Rabenhaupt returned to Coevorden to refresh his troops and to govern the region. He died there on 12 August 1675. A street in Groningen was named after him, and a sculpted bust of him was erected next to the town hall.

== Sources ==
- "Karel Rabenhaupt". Biografisch Portaal van Nederland.
- Poten, Bernhard (1888). "Rabenhaupt von Suche, Karl Freiherr" . Allgemeine Deutsche Biographie (in German). Vol. 27. Leipzig: Duncker & Humblot. pp. 85–87.
- Van der Aa, A. J. (1874). "RABENHAUPT (Karel)". Biographisch Woordenboek der Nederlanden (in Dutch). Vol. 16. Haarlem: Brederode. pp. 16–22.
- Van Nimwegen, Olaf (2010). The Dutch Army and the Military Revolutions, 1588–1688. Boydell Press. ISBN 978-1843835752.
