= Battle of Staphorst =

1673 battle during the Franco-Dutch War

- Part of the Franco-Dutch War
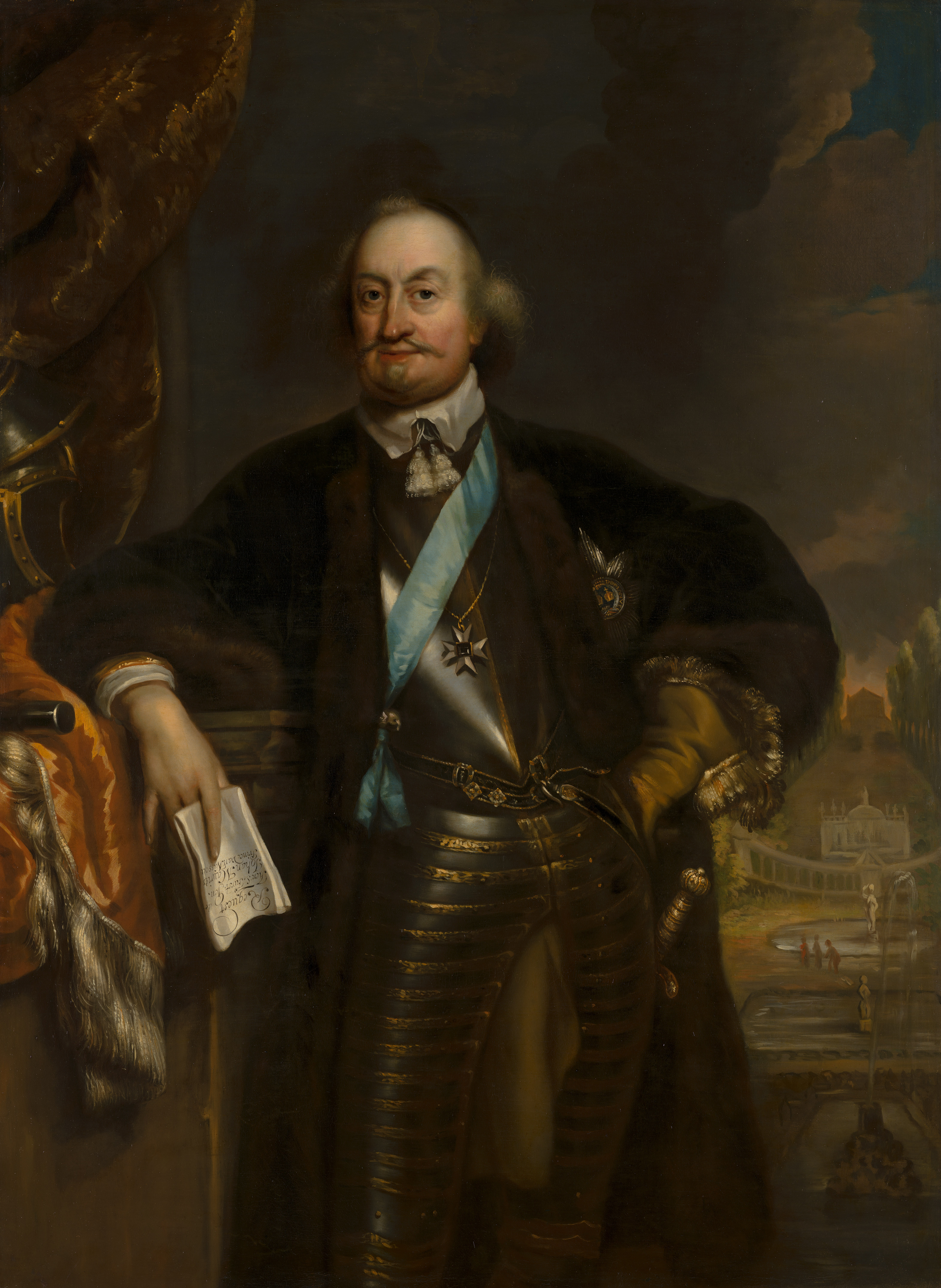
Date	2 July 1673
Location	Staphorst, the Netherlands
Result	Dutch victory

Belligerents
Dutch Republic	Münster

Commanders and leaders
(Dutch Republic) Nassau-Siegen (Dutch Republic) Willem van Aylva	Bernhard von Galen; Count of Lippe

The battle of Staphorst was a battle during the Franco-Dutch War, between troops led by John Maurice, Prince of Nassau-Siegen and Hans Willem van Aylva against the troops led by Christoph Bernhard von Galen, the battle resulted in a Dutch victory and led to the town being captured by Dutch forces. As a result of this battle, the Dutch troops would fight another battle, near Zwartsluis on 20 July, but without success.

== Sources ==
- Potgieter, Everhardus Johannes (1851). De gids: nieuwe vaderlandsche letteroefeningen, Volume 15, Deel 2; Volume 30 (E-book ed.). G.J.A. Beijerinck. p. 445.
- Knoop, Willem Jan (1895). Krijgs- en geschiedkundige beschouwingen over Willem den Derde (E-book ed.). Roelants. pp. VIII.
