= Ommerschans =

- Hamlet
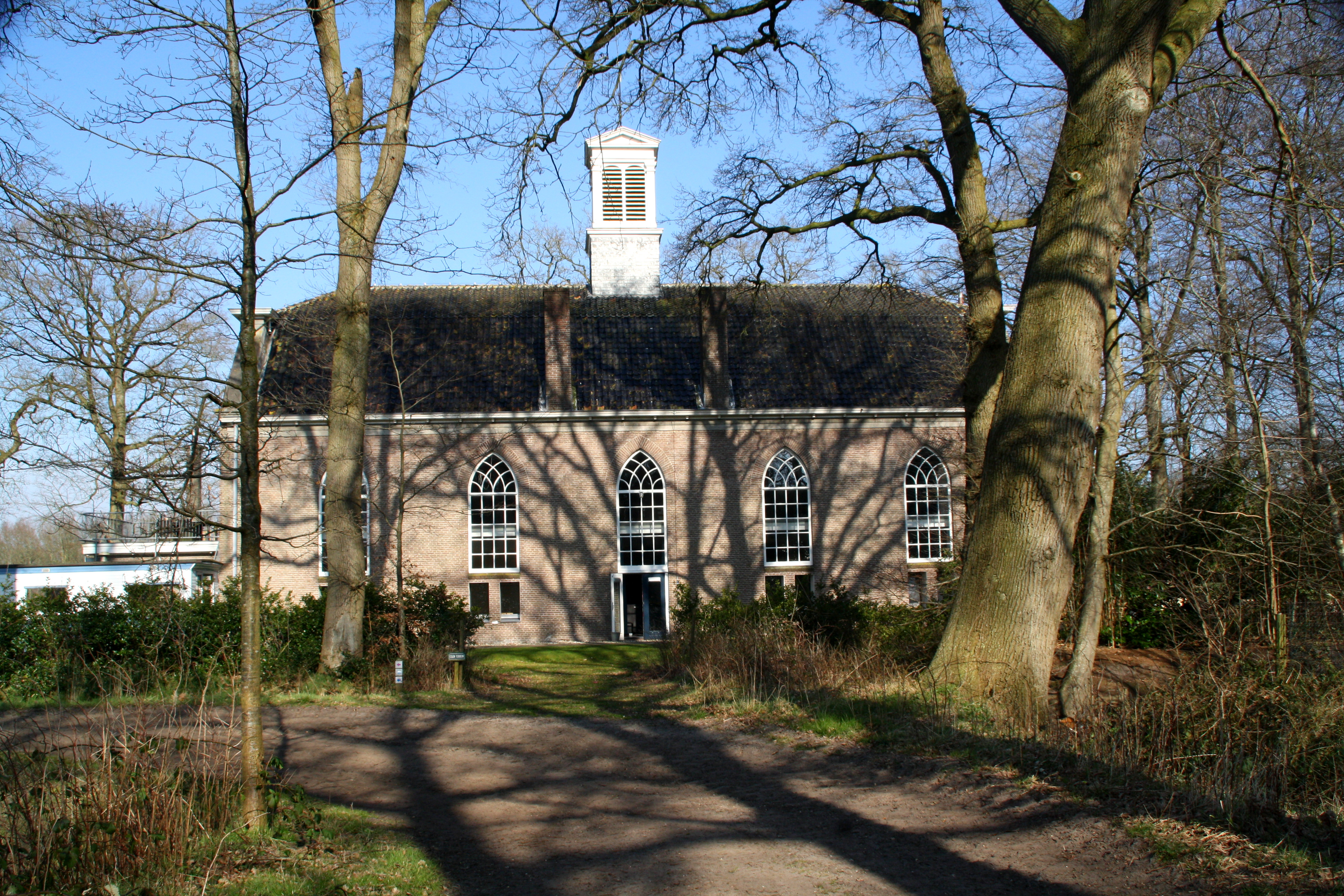
- Church at Ommerschans

- The village (dark red) and the statistical district (light green) of Ommerschans in the municipality of Ommen.

- Location in the province of Overijssel in the Netherlands Ommerschans (Netherlands)
- Coordinates: 52°35′9″N 6°24′21″E
- Country: Netherlands
- Province: Overijssel
- Municipality: Ommen

Area
  - Total: 4.22 km^{2} (1.63 sq mi)
- Elevation: 4 m (13 ft)

Population (2021)
  - Total: 130
  - Density: 31/km^{2} (80/sq mi)
- Time zone: UTC+1 (CET)
  - Summer (DST): UTC+2 (CEST)
- Postal code: 7739
- Dialing code: 0523

Ommerschans is a former bulwark in the Dutch province of Overijssel. It is a part of the municipality of Ommen, and lies about 16 km south of Hoogeveen.

== History ==
The Ommerschans was a fortress built in 1628 as part of a defence line to defend the northern provinces of Groningen and Friesland from the marauding count Hendrik van den Bergh (in Spanish service) after the expiration of the Twelve Years' Truce.

Its defences were strengthened again in the middle of the 17th century to defend against a possible invasion from the east. Nonetheless, the fortress was captured without any resistance when the Catholic bishops Bernhard von Galen of Münster and Maximilian Henry of Cologne invaded in 1672, the so-called rampjaar (or disaster year) that started the Franco-Dutch War. The 146 musketeers and 55 pikemen stationed at Ommerschans fled north, only to return later that year when the bishops retreated after their failed siege of the northern city of Groningen.

Under pressure from the citizens of Ommen and after the Peace of Utrecht of 1713, the fortress was closed down in 1715, only to be reinstated as a fortified arsenal in 1740 when war reignited in Continental Europe. During the Patriot Revolt of 1787, militias from Zwolle, Kampen and Vollenhove conquered and pillaged Ommerschans, stealing all its weaponry to help them in their paramilitary struggle against the regime. The fortification became abandoned and would never again be used for military purposes.

In the early 19th century, the Dutch government changed it into a resocialisation institution and labour camp for beggars, prostitutes and alcoholics from Amsterdam and other western cities. They were supposed to learn farming and morals by experience so they could reintegrate into society. In reality the beggars were used for semi-forced and all-but-unpaid labour to reclaim the wetlands surrounding Ommerschans, eventually reclaiming an area of 4 by 2½ kilometres. Politician and novelist Jacob van Lennep visited Ommerschans during his walking tour with Dirk van Hogendorp the younger across the newly independent United Kingdom of the Netherlands in the summer of 1823, and documented his appal at the conditions at the labour camp: "These hours are certainly among the saddest I have lived through."

When the institution went bankrupt in 1859 the Dutch government managed the labour camp until 1889, when it was finally closed down. During its years in operation, between several hundred and two thousand workers would live at Ommerschans at any one time, and an estimated 5448 workers died whilst at Ommerschans.

After its closure, the lands around Ommerschans became part of the state penitential institution Fpc Veldzicht, a few kilometers north at the village of Balkbrug. The grounds are still being cultivated by means of enforced labour.
