= Treaty of Kleve (1666) =

The Treaty of Kleve was a treaty signed in Kleve in 1666 which was proposed by Frederick William of Brandenburg. The two parties were the Dutch Republic under Johan de Witt and Bernhard von Galen of Münster. The treaty was signed due to Charles II of England stopping his funding of Bernhard von Galen's invasion of the Dutch Republic.

The terms were that Bernhard von Galen would retreat from the occupied territories of the Dutch Republic and give up his claim to the Lordship of Borculo. And that he reduced his army to 3 thousand men in exchange for 'eternal peace'.

Even though the Münsterite invasion was regarded as a 'minor incident' in the Dutch Republic, it did show that the States army had a lack of power and needed to be improved. The 'eternal peace' that was promised between the two would not last, since Bernhard von Galen would invade the Dutch Republic again in 1672.
