= Overdinkel =

Village in the east of the Netherlands

- Village
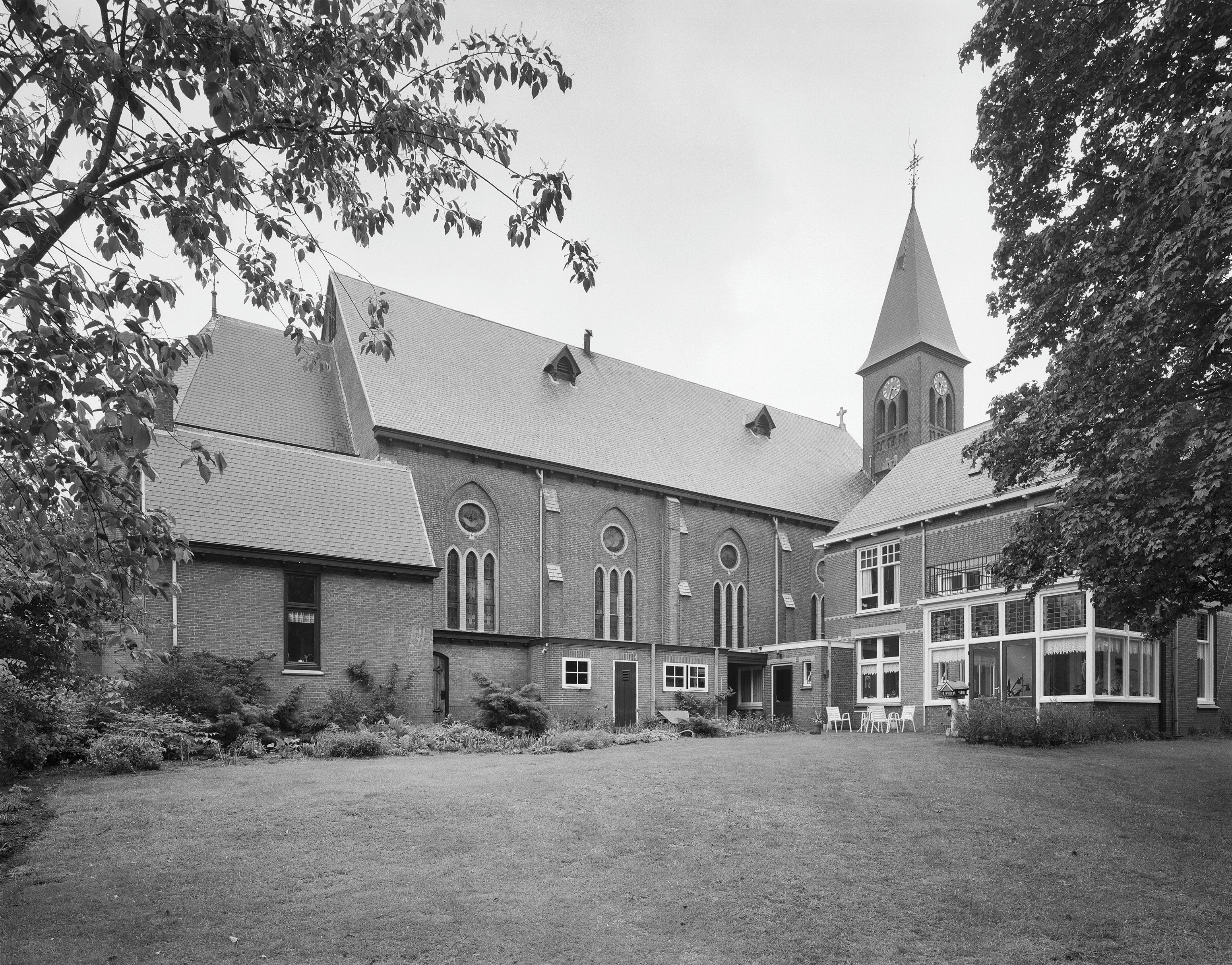
- Gerardus Majella church

- Location in the province of Overijssel in the Netherlands Overdinkel (Netherlands)
- Coordinates: 52°14′10″N 7°02′15″E
- Country: Netherlands
- Province: Overijssel
- Municipality: Losser

Area
  - Total: 10.04 km^{2} (3.88 sq mi)
- Elevation: 36 m (118 ft)

Population (2021)
  - Total: 4,110
  - Density: 409/km^{2} (1,060/sq mi)
- Time zone: UTC+1 (CET)
  - Summer (DST): UTC+2 (CEST)
- Postal code: 7586
- Dialing code: 053

Overdinkel is a village in the Twente region of the eastern Netherlands, in the municipality of Losser. It is named for the nearby river Dinkel. Its population in 2012 was 4,255. The territories of the Netherlands and the German Länder of North Rhine-Westphalia and Lower Saxony meet at a point to the east of Overdinkel.

== History ==
Overdinkel, previously a small farming community in a "solitary plain of heather and sand drifts", was developed in the early 20th century to house workers in the textile factories of Gronau. People from all over the Netherlands and from Germany came to live there. Since the Second World War the textile industry in the region has been in decline, and the village population is forecast also to decline, even though the hospitality industry has grown owing to the proximity of the German border. Overdinkel houses a community of Daughters of Our Lady of the Sacred Heart, founded in 1919.

== Local facilities ==
The village is reached by bus from Almelo and Oldenzaal railway stations. There are Roman Catholic and Dutch Reformed churches. Its cultural venue and community centre is known as 't Trefhuus (before 2016, Kulturhus).

== Gallery ==
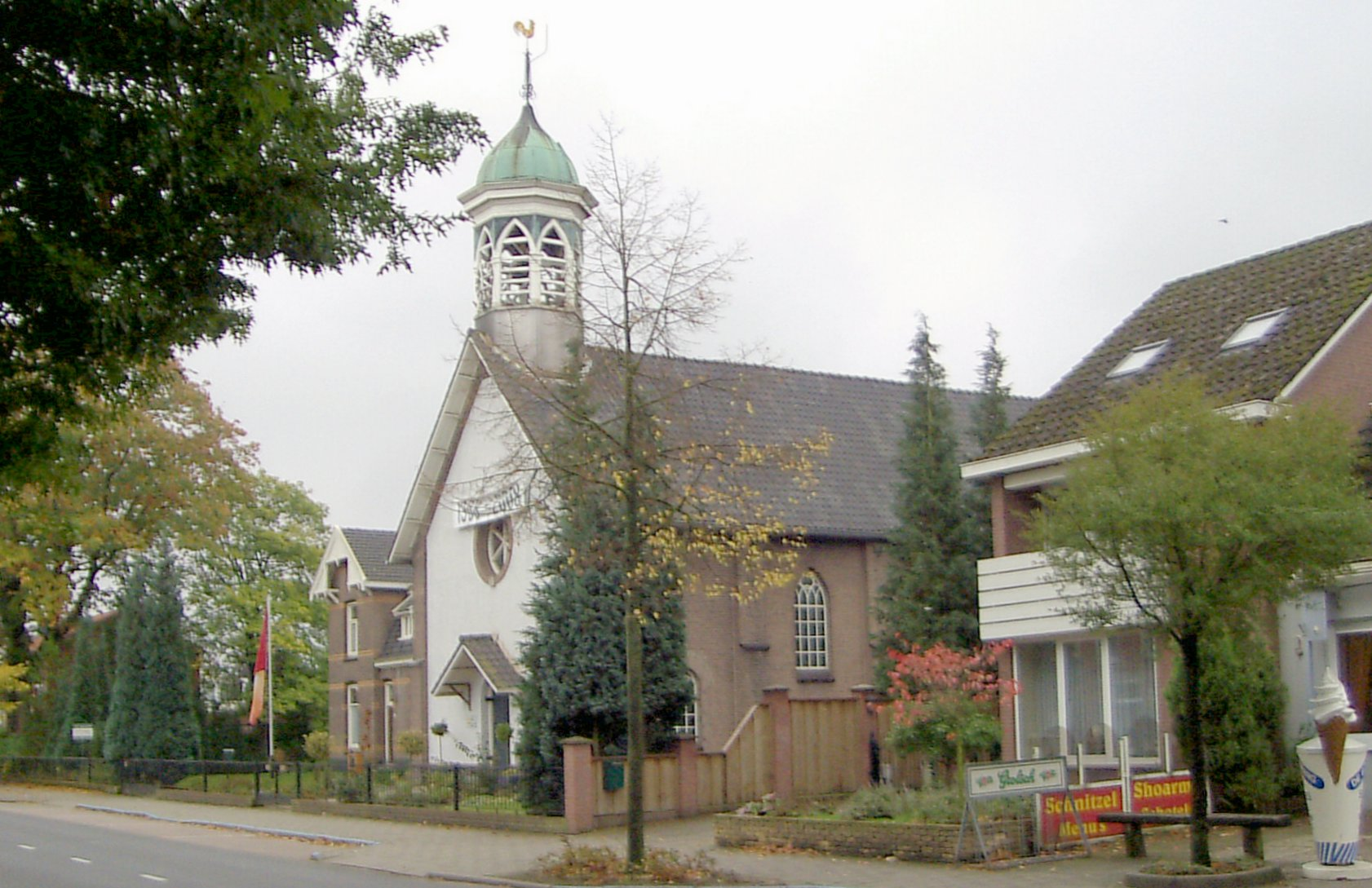
Protestant Church

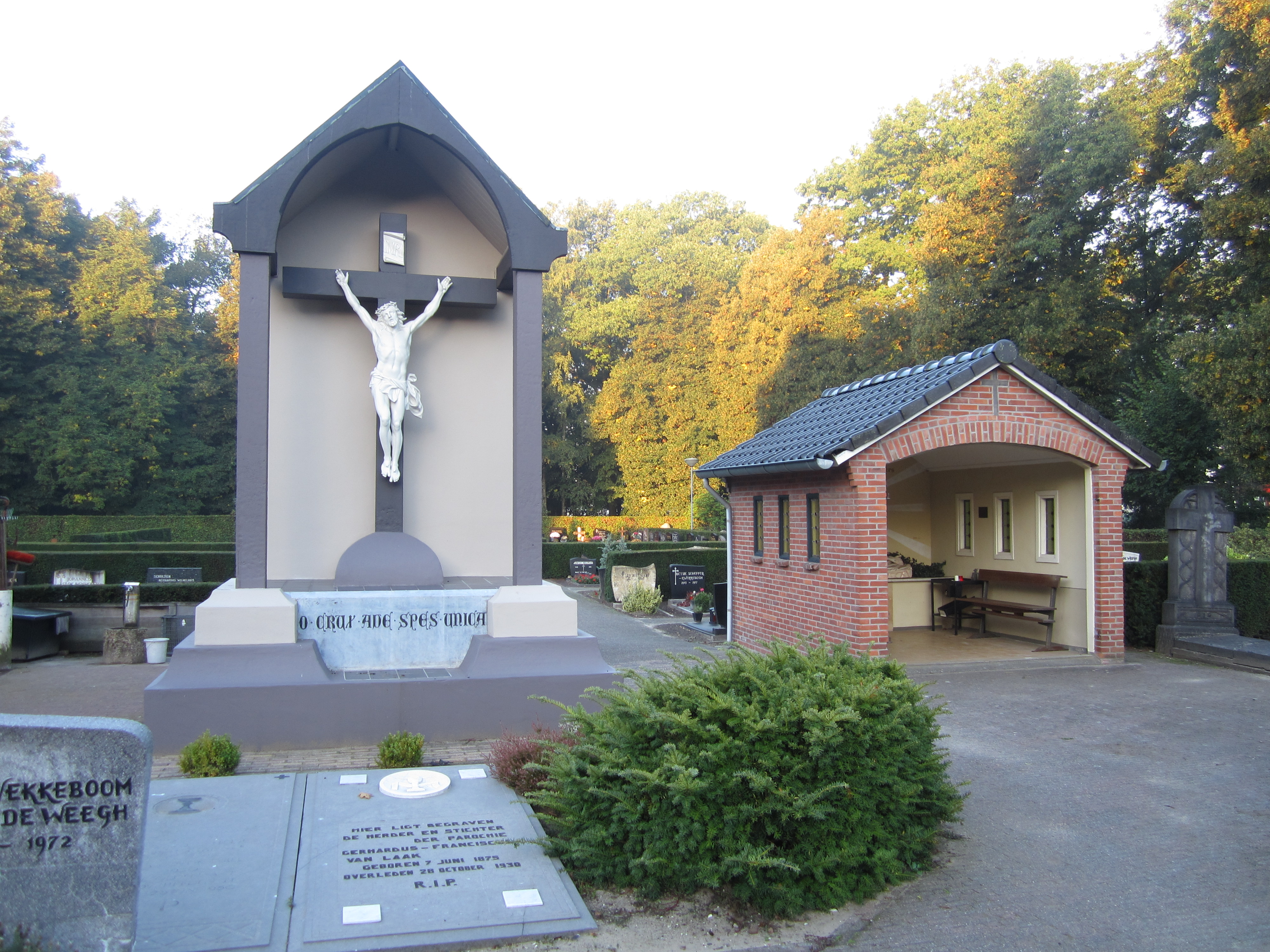
Crucifix at the cemetery

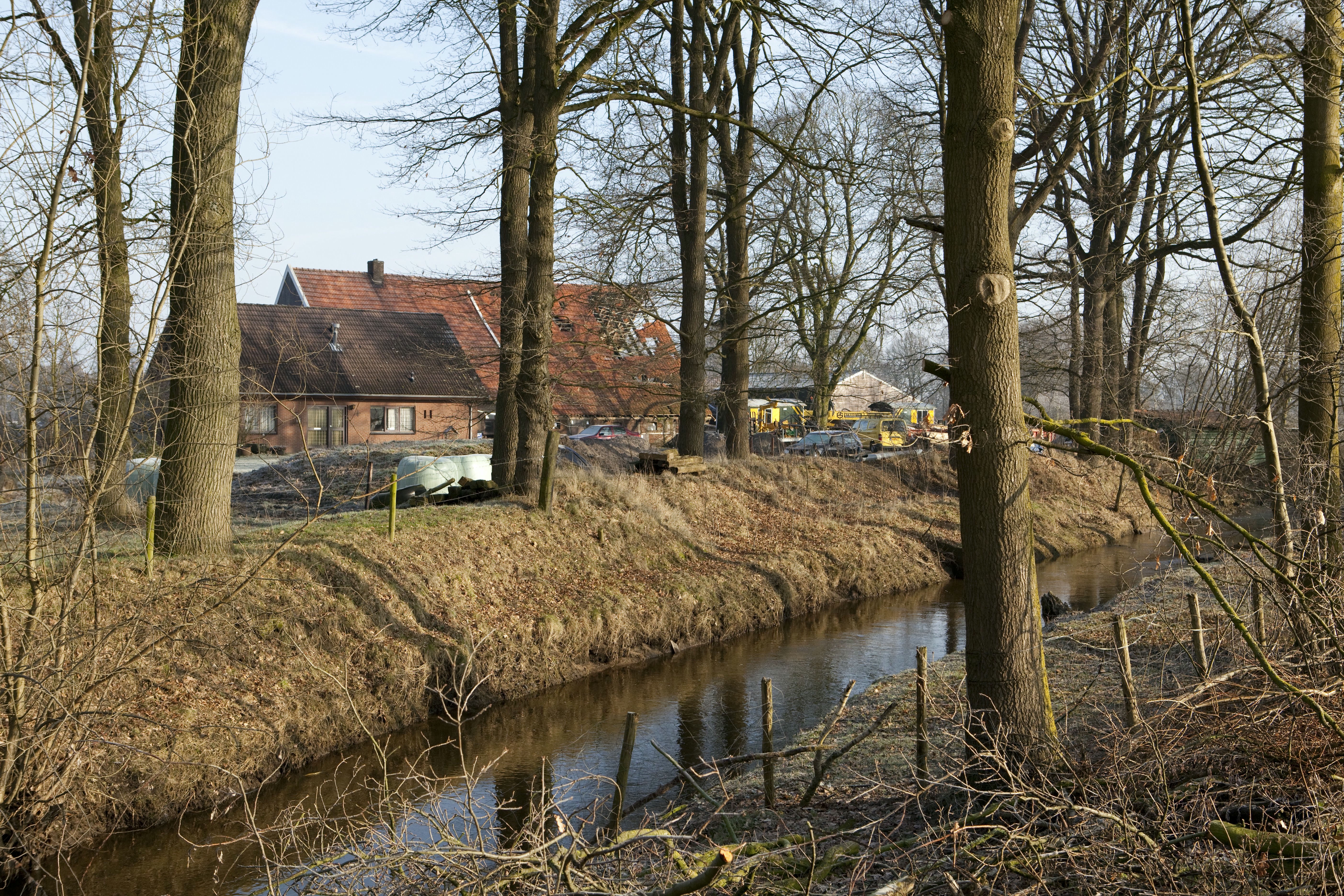
Farmhouse near a stream

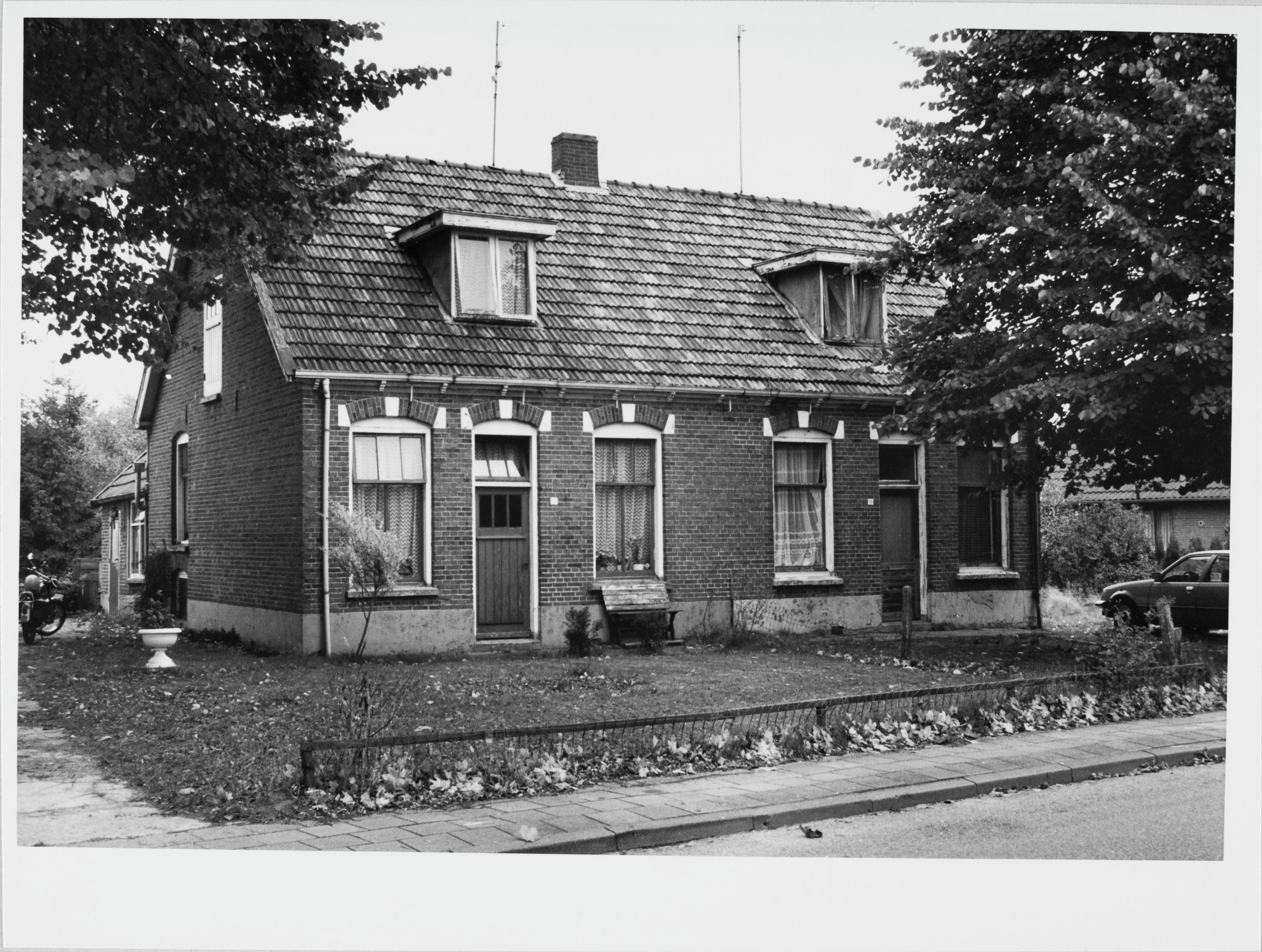
Semi-detached workers' house at the Kerkhofweg in 1982
