= Siege of Groningen (1672) =

1672 battle in the Franco-Dutch War

Coordinates: 53.2186°N 6.5672°E

- Part of the Franco-Dutch War and the Second Münster War
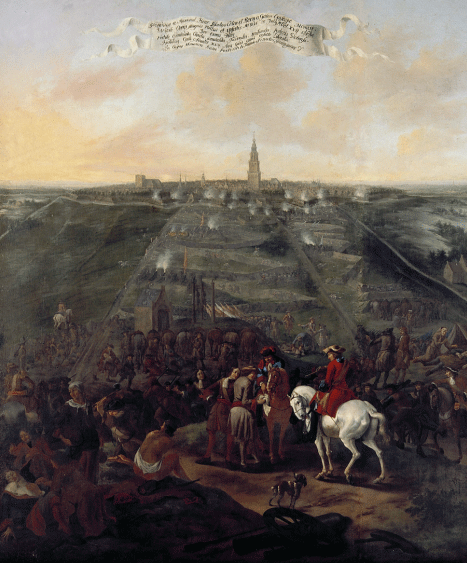
- The Siege of Groningen in 1672, painting by Folkert Bock
Date	9 July 1672 – 17 August 1672
Location	Groningen
Result	Dutch victory

Belligerents
Bishopric of Münster; Electorate of Cologne	Dutch Republic

Commanders and leaders
Bernhard von Galen	Carl von Rabenhaupt

Strength
13,000 – 24,000 men	2,500 men

Casualties and losses
5,000 – 10,000 men	Unknown

The siege of Groningen was a battle that took place in 1672 during the Franco-Dutch War. It was a Dutch victory that ended all hope of the Bishop of Münster to push deeper into the Netherlands. The Münster army was so weakened by the defeat that the Dutch army successfully reconquered much of the land that Münster had conquered just weeks earlier. Every year, the city of Groningen celebrates its victory as a local holiday on 28 August.

On 28 August that year, after a siege of only a month, the Bishop of Münster ordered the withdrawal of his troops. He was popularly called “Berend Bombs” due to the frequent use of bombs fired from cannons, the most modern weaponry of the time, which caused considerable damage within the city walls.

== Background ==
After the French captured Dutch held fortresses among the Rhine, like Rheinberg or Wesel in just under a week. Bernhard von Galen along with Maximilian Henry of Bavaria, under Cologne would invade the Dutch Republic. By first taking Lingen and invading Overijssel on 1 June. And after helping the French take Groenlo, he would advance further into the Republic. On 19 July, Bernhard took Coevorden after a short siege with an army of 24.000 men. Afterwards, Bernhard had to choose; Either invade Friesland or take Groningen. Bernhard eventually chose to besiege Groningen, because his connections with the Nieuweschans would be closer, and he thought he could invade Friesland with just a few thousand men. Bernhard eventually marched and arrived before Groningen on 19 July.

== Siege ==
The siege started on 21 July. In contrast to other Dutch cities besieged earlier in the war, Groningen was well prepared under the command of Carl von Rabenhaupt, with a garrison of around 2,500 men. The troops of the Bishop surrounded the city, and the countryside was plundered.

On 26 July, after a few days, the attacking armies caused significant damage to the surrounding houses. The day after, the Münsterite and Cologne forces started to bombard the city. That would earn Bernhard the nickname 'Bommen Berend' in the Netherlands. When these bombardments happened, the inhabitants of Groningen attempted to seek help for more troops to defend the city. On 27 July, their request was received by the States General, and William III of Orange decided to send a regiment to Groningen under Colonel Jorman.

Although the troops under Bernhard von Galen tried hard to bombard the city, their attempts were to no avail, mainly due to their supplies being harassed by a guerilla campaign by van Aylva in Friesland. On 27 August, Bernhard had to retreat due to his men starving and poor conditions. Groningen was successfully defended.

== Aftermath ==
After the siege of Groningen, Bernhard would retreat after losing 5.000-10.000 men. And in December of the same year, Carl von Rabenhaupt would besiege and recapture Coevorden. Which shifted the war in the east towards the favour of the Dutch Republic. Friesland would also be saved after the siege, which meant that the Amsterdam trade-route would also be saved since it revolved around the Zuiderzee
