= Siege of Groenlo (1672) =

1672 siege

- Part of the Franco-Dutch War
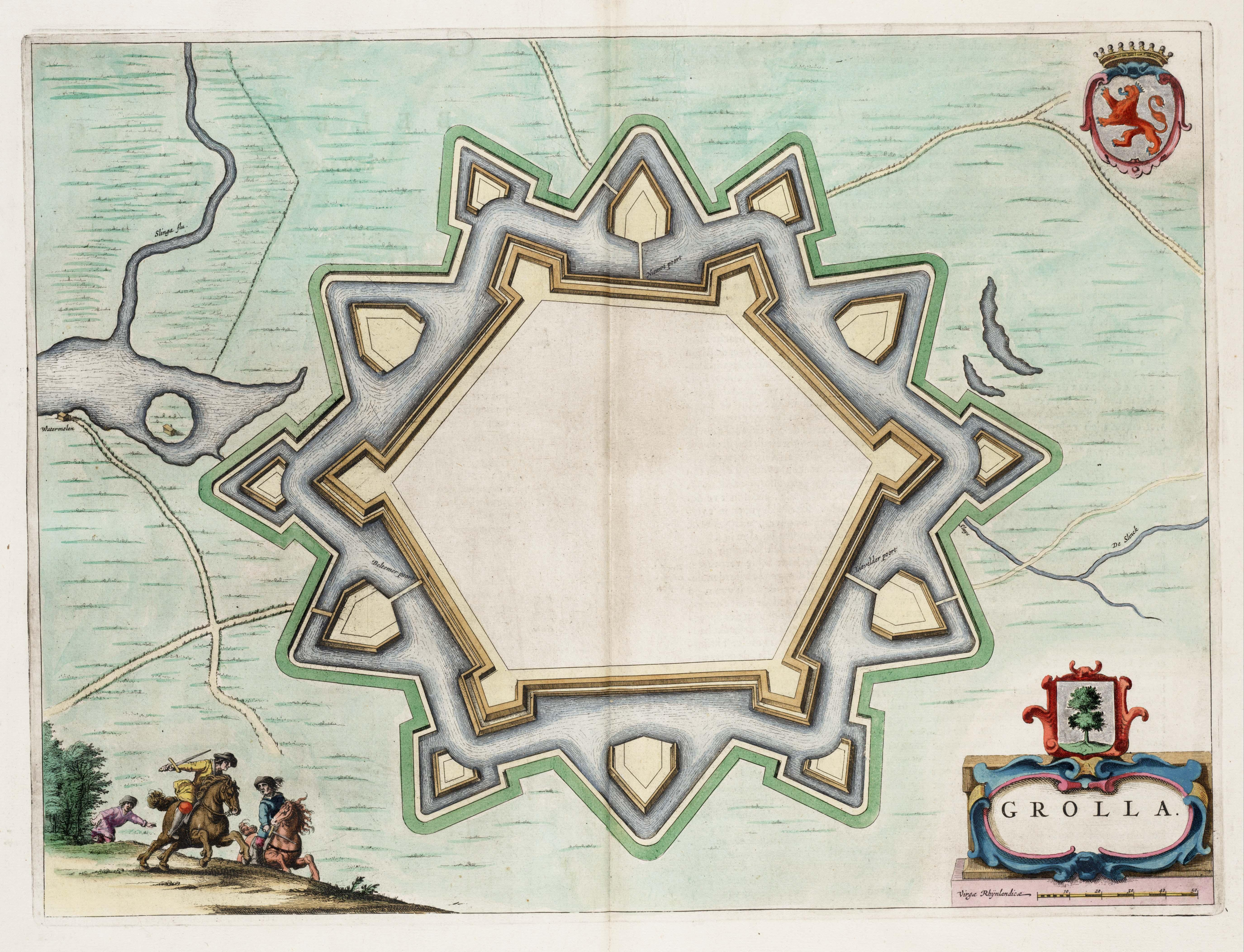
- Map of Grol's fortifications, restored after the siege of 1627. J.Blaeu
Date	1–10 June 1672
Location	Groenlo, Gelderland 52.042°N 6.616°E
Result	Franco-Münster victory

Belligerents
Dutch Republic	France; Cologne; Münster

Commanders and leaders
(Dutch Republic) Gustaff Tungel	Bernhard von Galen

Strength
600	100,000

Casualties and losses
Unknown	Unknown

The siege of Groenlo was a 10-day siege of the Dutch town of Groenlo from 1 to 10 June 1672 by the combined forces of France, the Elector of Cologne and the Prince-Bishop of Münster during the Franco-Dutch War. It ended in the town's surrender.

== Course ==
After the secret Treaty of Dover between France, England, the Prince-Bishop of Münster and the Archbishop of Cologne against the Dutch Republic, French troops passed through the possessions of Münster and Cologne and a few other French allies then the Spanish Netherlands, enabling them to by-pass the Dutch defences in the south and invade the Dutch from the east in June. Bernhard von Galen, bishop of Münster, invaded the Netherlands the on 1 June 1672 in several places, taking several towns (including Enschede, Almelo and Borculo) and laying siege to Groenlo, where his forces were joined by those of France and Cologne.

Groenlo was well-supplied with food, garrisoned with 22 cannon on new gun-carriages and 600 troops (made up of 10 infantry companies and 1 cavalry company, led by the infantry lieutenant-colonel Gustaff Tungel) and defended by bulwarks and a moat (which had proved their effectiveness in a 1627 siege). However, vastly outnumbered by the French force of over 100,000, it was only able to hold out for 10 days, after which the besiegers moved on to Deventer and other cities, in what became the 'Rampjaar' for the Dutch Republic. The most important parts of Groenlo's fortifications were demolished by the Bishop of Münster and his occupying troops only left the town in 1674.

== Sources ==
- (in Dutch) J.W. van Sypesteyn, J.P. de Bordes (1850): De Verdediging van Nederland in 1672 en 1673; Bijdragen tot de Staats- en Krijgeschiedenis van Nederland, 's-Gravenhage: Van Langenhuysen
