= Christoph Bernhard von Galen =

German bishop (1606–1678)

- Prince-Bishop of Münster
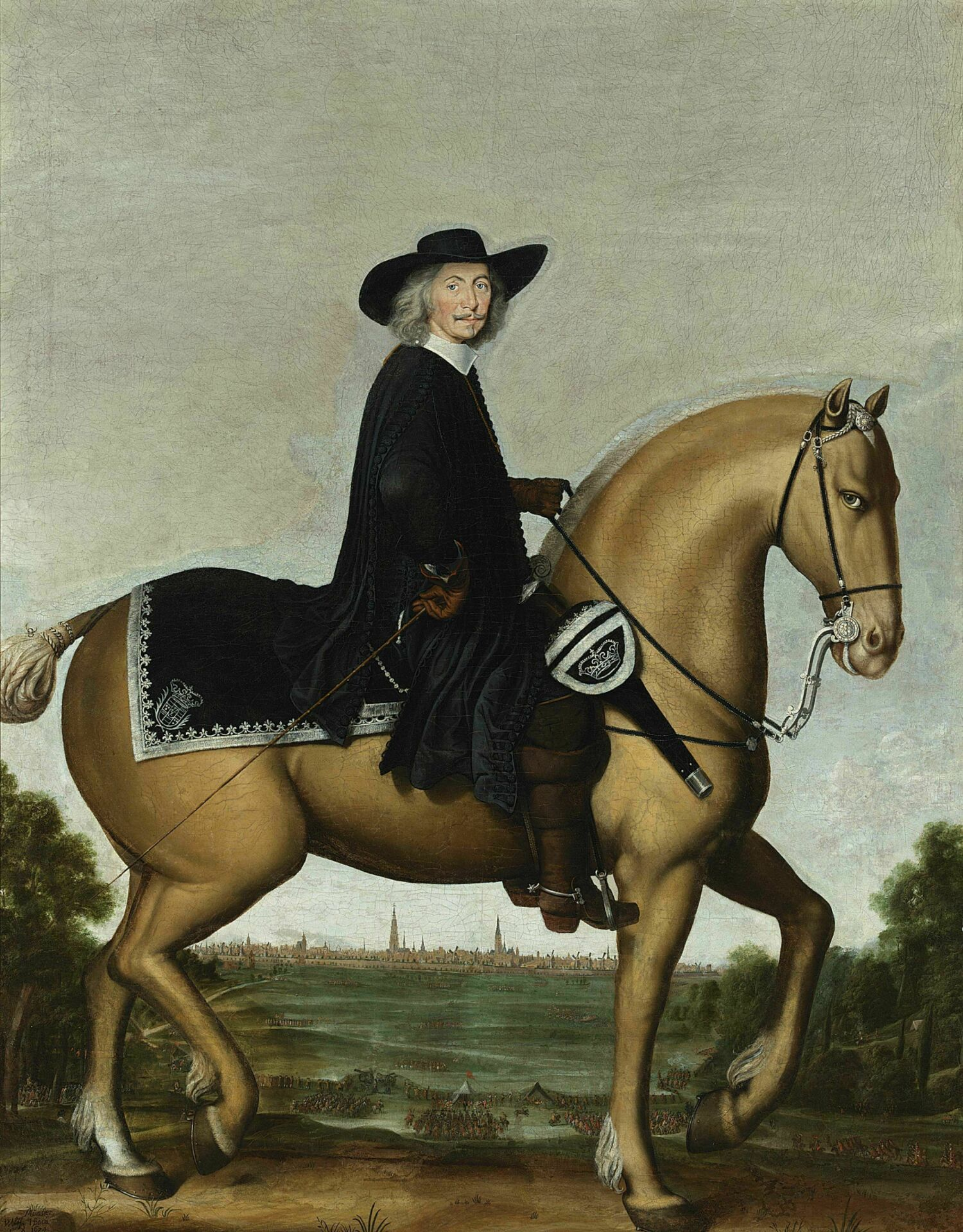
- Christopher Bernhard von Galen by Wolfgang Heimbach
- Church: Catholic Church
- Diocese: Diocese of Münster
- In office: 22 May 1651 – 19 September 1678
- Predecessor: Ferdinand of Bavaria
- Successor: Ferdinand of Fürstenberg

Orders
- Ordination: August 1651
- Consecration: 17 September 1651 by Franz Wilhelm von Wartenberg

Personal details
- Born: 12 October 1606 Drensteinfurt, Prince-Bishopric of Münster, Holy Roman Empire
- Died: 19 September 1678 (aged 71) Ahaus, Prince-Bishopric of Münster, Holy Roman Empire

Christoph Bernhard Freiherr von Galen (12 October 1606 – 19 September 1678) was Prince-bishop of Münster. He was born into a noble Westphalian family.

== Background, education and conversion to Roman Catholicism ==
Christoph Bernhard von Galen was born on 12 October 1606 to Lutheran parents of the aristocratic von Galen family. His father, Dietrich von Galen, had estates in the Baltic region and bore the title of Marshal of Courland. During a state assembly in Münster, Dietrich von Galen killed the Münster hereditary marshal, Gerd Morrien zu Nordkirchen, on 15 February 1607, and consequently had to spend twelve years in detention at Bevergern Castle. Because his wife accompanied him voluntarily, in 1616 the young Christoph Bernhard was placed under the care of his uncle, the Canon of Münster, Heinrich von Galen. He gave him a Catholic education by Jesuits at the Paulinum in Münster.

In 1619, at 13, he took his first job working for the cathedral chapter in Münster. In 1626, when he had reached the required age, he moved to Cologne and Mainz, to complete his education at a Jesuit school. An educational journey took him to Bourges and Bordeaux in France, from where he returned to Münster in July 1627. The time of the Thirty Years' War (1618-1648) affected him. In 1630 he became treasurer of the cathedral and in 1634 a spiritual advisor (Geistlicher Rat). At that time, not many canons were active politically. Von Galen was given numerous diplomatic missions. He repeatedly took part in negotiations with the imperial generals in Westphalia.

== Biography ==
Reduced to poverty through the loss of his paternal inheritance, he took holy orders; but this did not prevent him from fighting on the side of Emperor Ferdinand III during the concluding stages of the Thirty Years' War. In 1650 he was elected prince-bishop of Münster, succeeding Ferdinand of Bavaria.

After restoring a degree of peace and prosperity in his principality, Galen had to contend with a formidable insurrection on the part of the citizens of Münster; but in 1661 this was solved by the occupation of the city. At the head of the largest ecclesiastical principality of the Holy Roman Empire, the prince-bishop, who maintained a strong army, became an important personage in Europe. In 1664, he was chosen one of the directors of the imperial army raised to fight the Turks, but his troops came too late to fight; after the peace which followed the Christian victory at the Battle of St. Gotthard in August 1664, he aided Charles II of England in his Second Anglo-Dutch War with the Dutch, until the intervention of Louis XIV and Frederick William, Elector of Brandenburg compelled him to make a disadvantageous peace in 1666 in Cleve.

Coat of arms of Christopher Bernhard von Galen

When Galen again attacked the Dutch Republic six years later in the Franco-Dutch War, he was in alliance with Louis XIV, who helped him take Groenlo. His troops went more east and north and conquered not only Deventer and Coevorden. His army got stuck before the city of Groningen, failing to occupy the coast in the north, because of the deliberate flooding of the fields and marshes that became almost impassible. In October 1674 he withdrew his troops from the Dutch Republic and gave up his attempts to restore Catholicism to the Eastern provinces. In 1675 he deserted his former ally, and fought for the emperor Leopold I against France. In conjunction with Brandenburg and Denmark–Norway he attacked Charles XI of Sweden, and conquered the Duchy of Bremen in the Bremen-Verden campaign during the Swedish-Brandenburg War. Von Galen died at Ahaus.

He proved himself anxious to reform the church, although his chief energies were directed to increasing his power and prestige, in the course of which he succeeded in getting rid of the foreign armies which had been occupying Westphalia since the Peace of Westphalia in 1648.

== In popular culture ==
In the Netherlands he carries the nickname "Bommen Berend" ("Bombs Bernard") because he unsuccessfully laid siege to the Dutch city of Groningen using artillery. A holiday with this name is still celebrated in the city of Groningen on 28 August to commemorate the breaking of the siege.

== See also ==
- Strasbourg Agreement (1675), the first chemical weapons treaty in history, which was negotiated as a result of Bishop von Galen's siege of Groningen.

== Notes ==
Christoph Bernhard von Galen Galen family Born: 12 October 1606 in Drensteinfurt Died: 19 September 1678 in Ahaus
Catholic Church titles
Regnal titles
Preceded by Ferdinand I of Bavaria	Prince-Bishop of Münster as Bernard; 1650-1678	Succeeded by Ferdinand II of Fürstenberg
