= Land reclamation in the Netherlands =

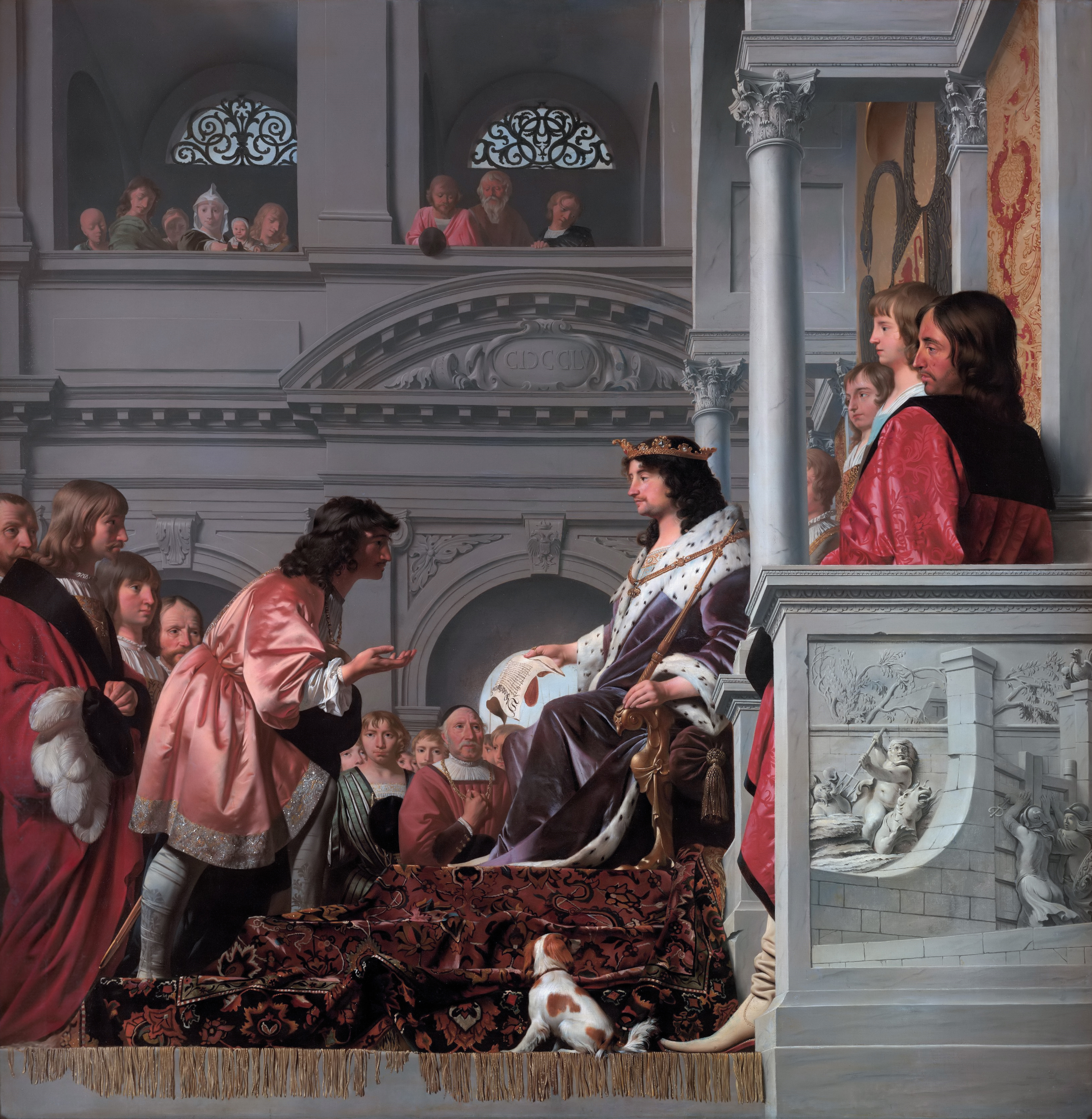
William II of Holland grants the charter to the Water Board of Rhineland in the 13th century.

Land reclamation in the Netherlands has a long history. As early as the 14th century, the first reclaimed land had been settled. Much of the modern land reclamation has been done as a part of the Zuiderzee Works since 1919. Land reclamation in the 20th century added an additional 1,650 square kilometres (640 sq mi) to the country's land area.

It is estimated that about 65% of the country would be under water at high tide if it were not for the existence and the country's use of dikes, dunes and pumps. 26% of the Netherlands by area, and 21% by population, is located below the mean sea level.

== History and origins ==
The Netherlands has a coastline that is constantly changing with erosion caused by wind and water. The Dutch people inhabiting the region had at first built primitive dikes to protect their settlements from the sea. In the northern parts of the Netherlands sea levels fell exposing new land at a rate of 5–10 meters per year between 500 BC and 500 AD. This natural process was exploited to claim new agricultural lands. Discontinuous dikes were built to protect the new farms.

Smaller strips of land were reclaimed by filling with sand or other types of land materials. This was usually done near urban and harbour areas since the 14th century. For instance, Amsterdam and Rotterdam were expanding in this manner.

The development of using windmills for pumping water in the 15th century allowed the draining of significant bodies of water. This resulted in the creation of polders. The first steam powered water mill was put to use in 1787.

=== Recent history ===
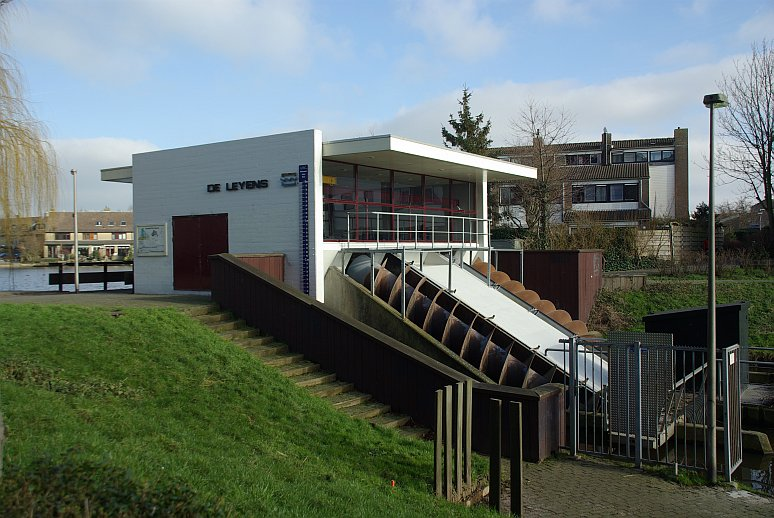
A modern pumping station in Zoetermeer

In 2012, plans emerged to create the Marker Wadden, a group of islands designed to establish nature reserves in the north of the Markermeer. In contrast to the Markerwaard, no human occupation is planned. The creation process began in early 2016.

== Polders ==
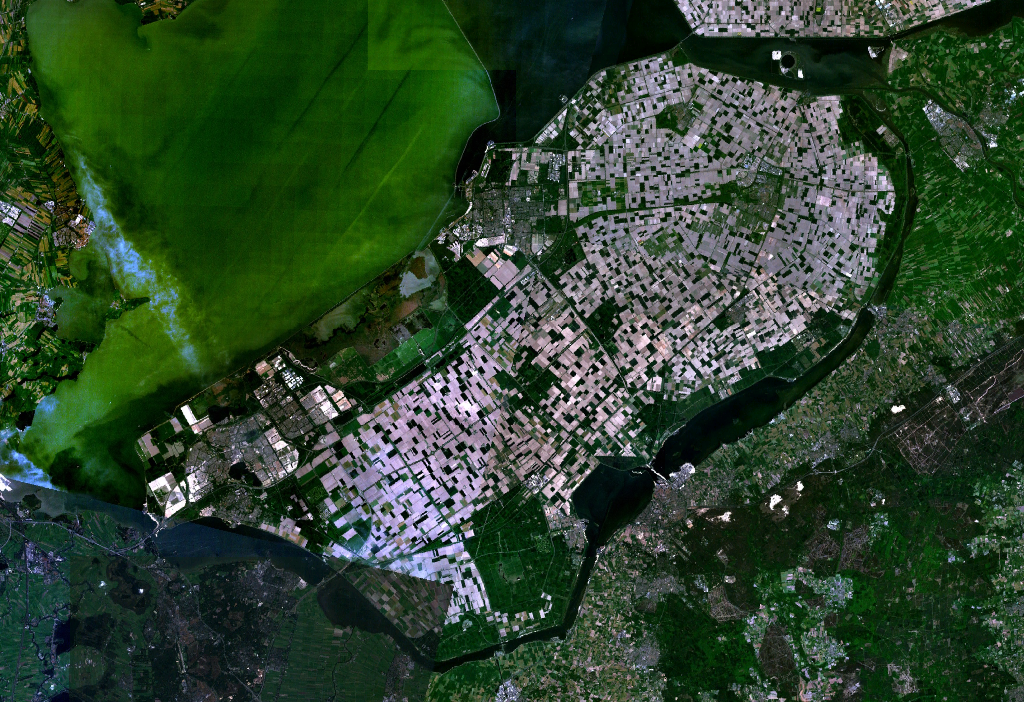
A satellite image of Flevopolder in Flevoland

The Netherlands is frequently associated with polders, as its engineers became noted for developing techniques to drain wetlands and make them usable for agriculture and other development. This is illustrated by the saying: "God created the world, but the Dutch created the Netherlands"

The Dutch have a long history of reclamation of marshes and fenland, resulting in some 3,000 polders nationwide. About half the total surface area of polders in north-west Europe is in the Netherlands. The first embankments in Europe were constructed in Roman times. The first polders were constructed in the 11th century.

As a result of flooding disasters, water boards called waterschap (when situated more inland) or hoogheemraadschap (near the sea, mainly used in the Holland region) were set up to maintain the integrity of the water defences around polders, maintain the waterways inside a polder, and control the various water levels inside and outside the polder. Water boards hold separate elections, levy taxes, and function independently from other government bodies. Their function is basically unchanged even today. As such they are the oldest democratic institution in the country. The necessary cooperation among all ranks to maintain polder integrity gave its name to the Dutch version of third way politics—the Polder Model.

The 1953 flood disaster prompted a new approach to the design of dikes and other water-retaining structures, based on an acceptable probability of overflowing. Risk is defined as the product of probability and consequences. The potential damage in lives, property and rebuilding costs is compared to the potential cost of water defences. From these calculations follows an acceptable flood risk from the sea at one in 4,000–10,000 years, while it is one in 100–2,500 years for a river flood. The particular established policy guides the Dutch government to improve flood defences as new data on threat levels becomes available.

=== List of polders ===
Some famous Dutch polders and the year they were laid dry are:

- Beemster (1609–1612)
- Schermer (1633–1635)
- Haarlemmermeerpolder (1852)
- As part of the Zuiderzee Works:
  - Wieringermeerpolder (1930)
  - Noordoostpolder (1942)
  - Flevopolder (1956–1966)

== Proposed developments ==
The Markerwaard is the name of a proposed polder in the IJsselmeer that was never built. The construction of Markerwaard would have resulted in the near-total reclamation of the Markermeer. Markerwaard was expected to be finished in 1978.

In 1941 work for this project started; about 2 km of a dike north of Marken was built. It would have had an area of nearly 600 km^{2}. But the German occupation stopped the project. Later, it was decided that the Flevopolder should have priority. In 1957, the island of Marken was connected to the mainland of the province North-Holland. In 1976 the dam Houtribdijk connecting Enkhuizen and Lelystad was completed, a necessary step in the construction of Markerwaard, the dikes for the bordering lakes were still to be completed. However the entire project became mired in political and environmental controversy. In the late 1970s, the project was revised down leaving wide bordering lakes between the polder and North Holland. Marken would remain a peninsula, unlike on the original project. At this stage, the Markerwaard would have had an area of 410 km^{2}.

Finally, in 2003, it was decided not to build this polder.

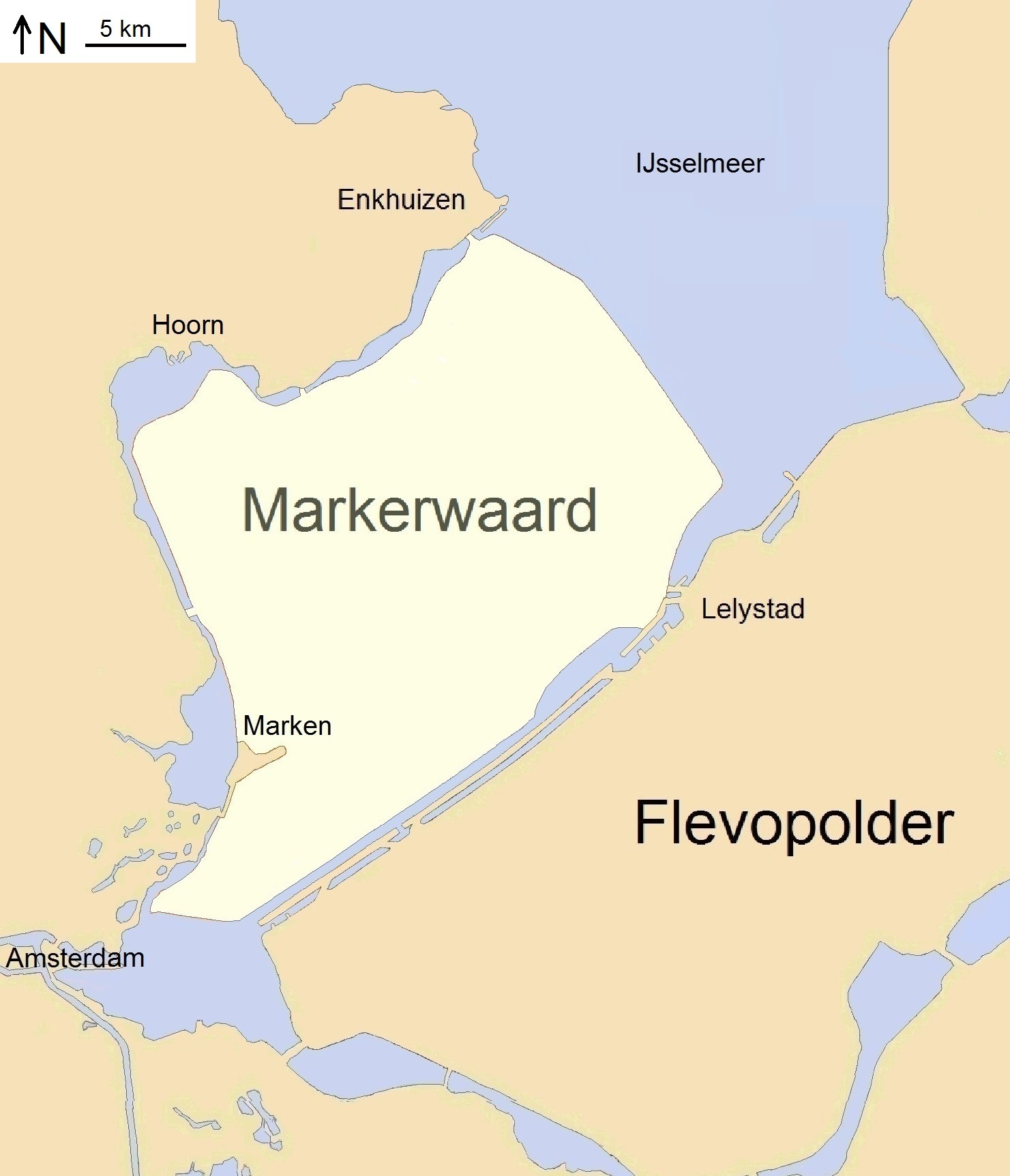
1965 plan for a polder

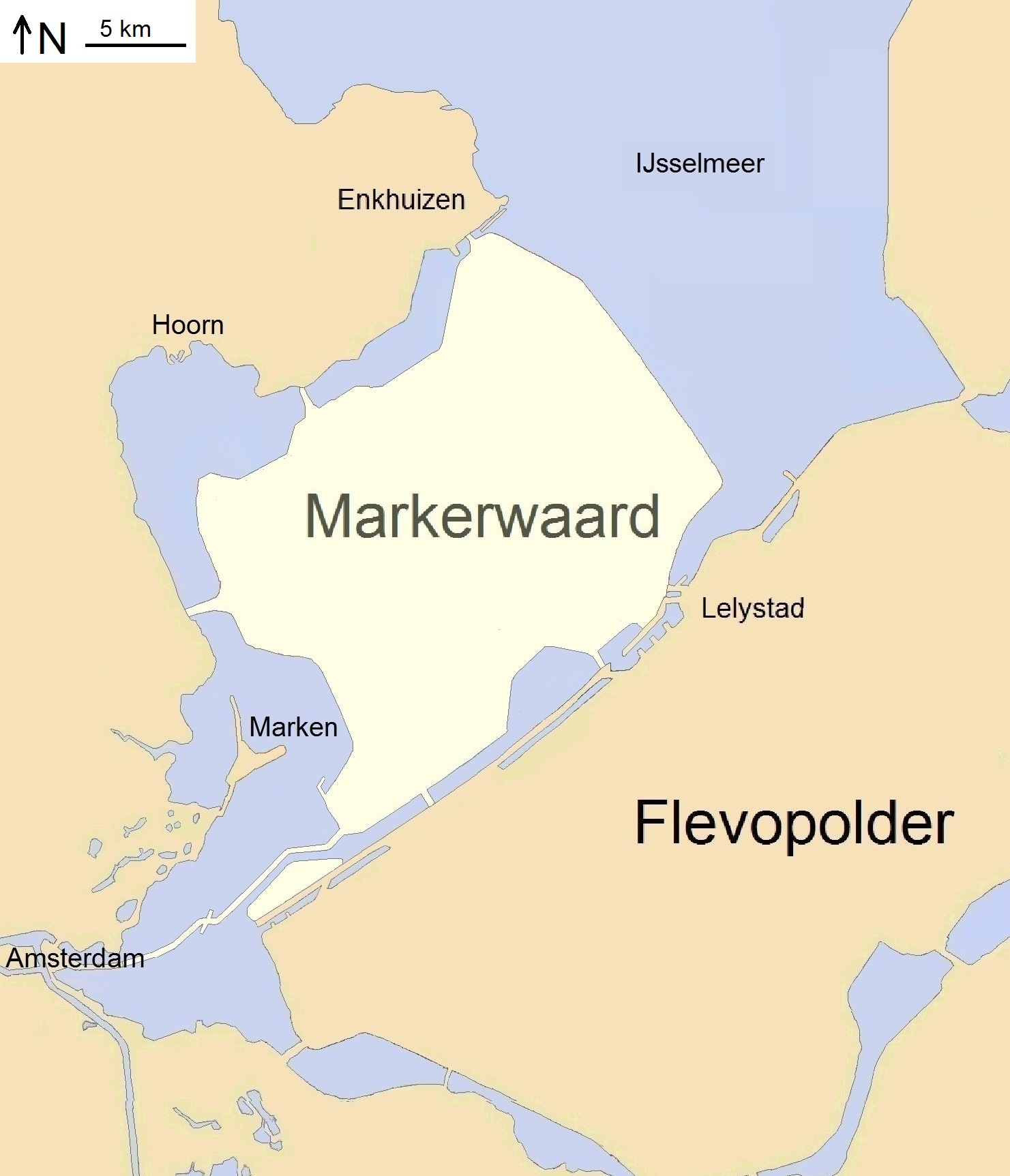
1981 plan for a polder

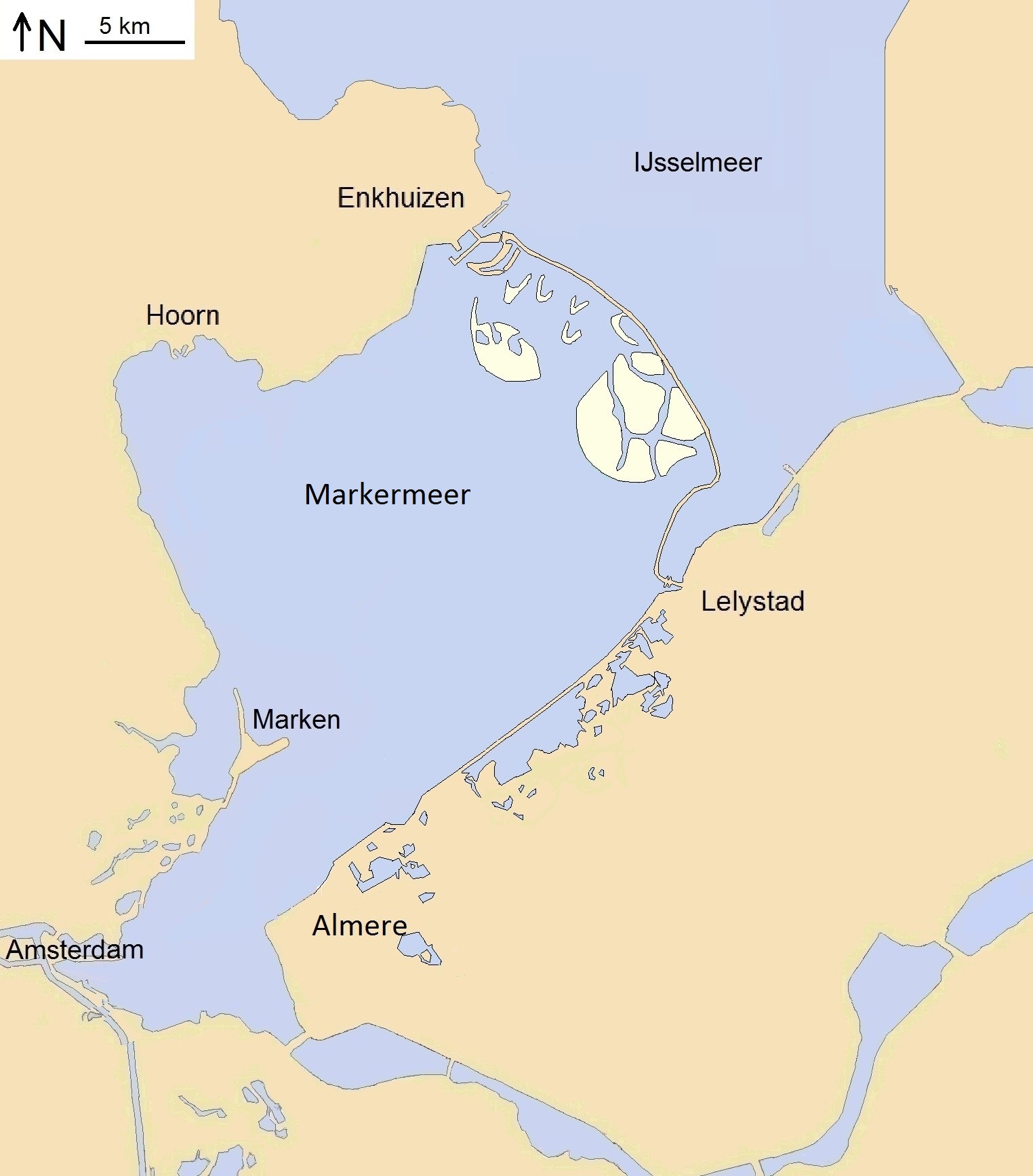
The Marker Wadden project

Different proposals for land reclamation at Markermeer

== Opposition ==
In the 1960s, the Vereniging tot Behoud van de Waddenzee organization successfully campaigned against plans to reclaim part of the Wadden Sea.

In 1974, the Association for the Preservation of the IJssel Lake (also known as the Vereniging tot Behoud van het IJsselmeer), one of the most vocal groups against land reclamation, published Plan Waterlely, which provided opposing viewpoints and solutions to land reclamation. Among its many arguments, it said that land reclamation was no longer needed as a Dutch tradition since it was no longer needed for flood prevention, as previous reclamation projects were used for. The Plan also argued that urbanization would lead to more land reclamation, which would create a never ending cycle of reclamation, and that creating newly reclaimed land would only delay the fixing of the core issues of urbanization. Also, it argued that issues that were generated on "old land" should remain there, and not be expanded into newly reclaimed land. Though dismissed by the Dutch government, the press generally was well receptive to the Plan.

== See also ==
- Delta Works
- Dijkgraaf (official)
- Flood control in the Netherlands
- Lauwersmeer
- Water board (Netherlands)
- Windmills at Kinderdijk
