= Naviduct =

Type of navigable aqueduct

Coordinates: 52°41′26.40″N 5°17′43.78″E

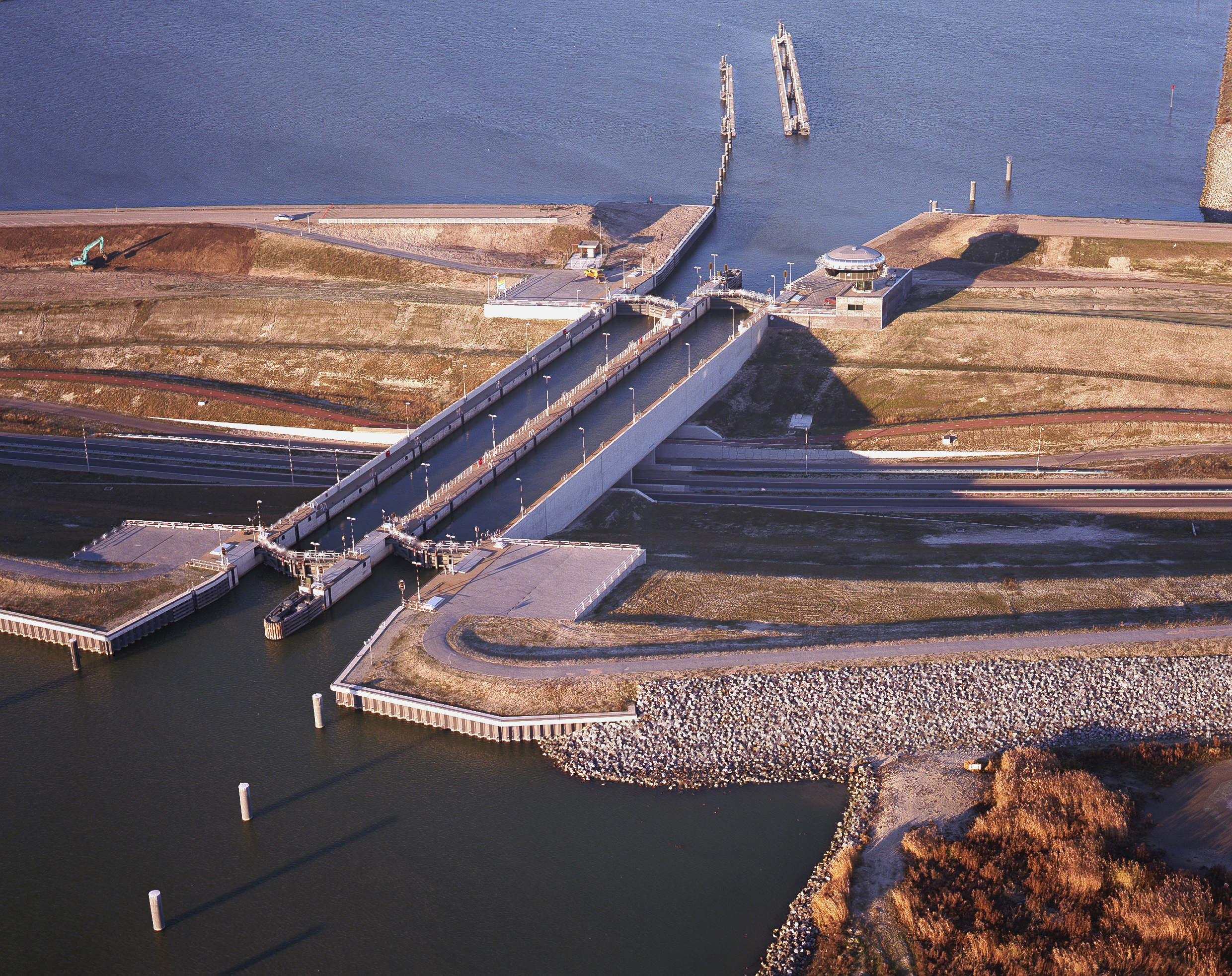
Krabbersgat naviduct, near Enkhuizen, Netherlands (Photo: Rijkswaterstaat)

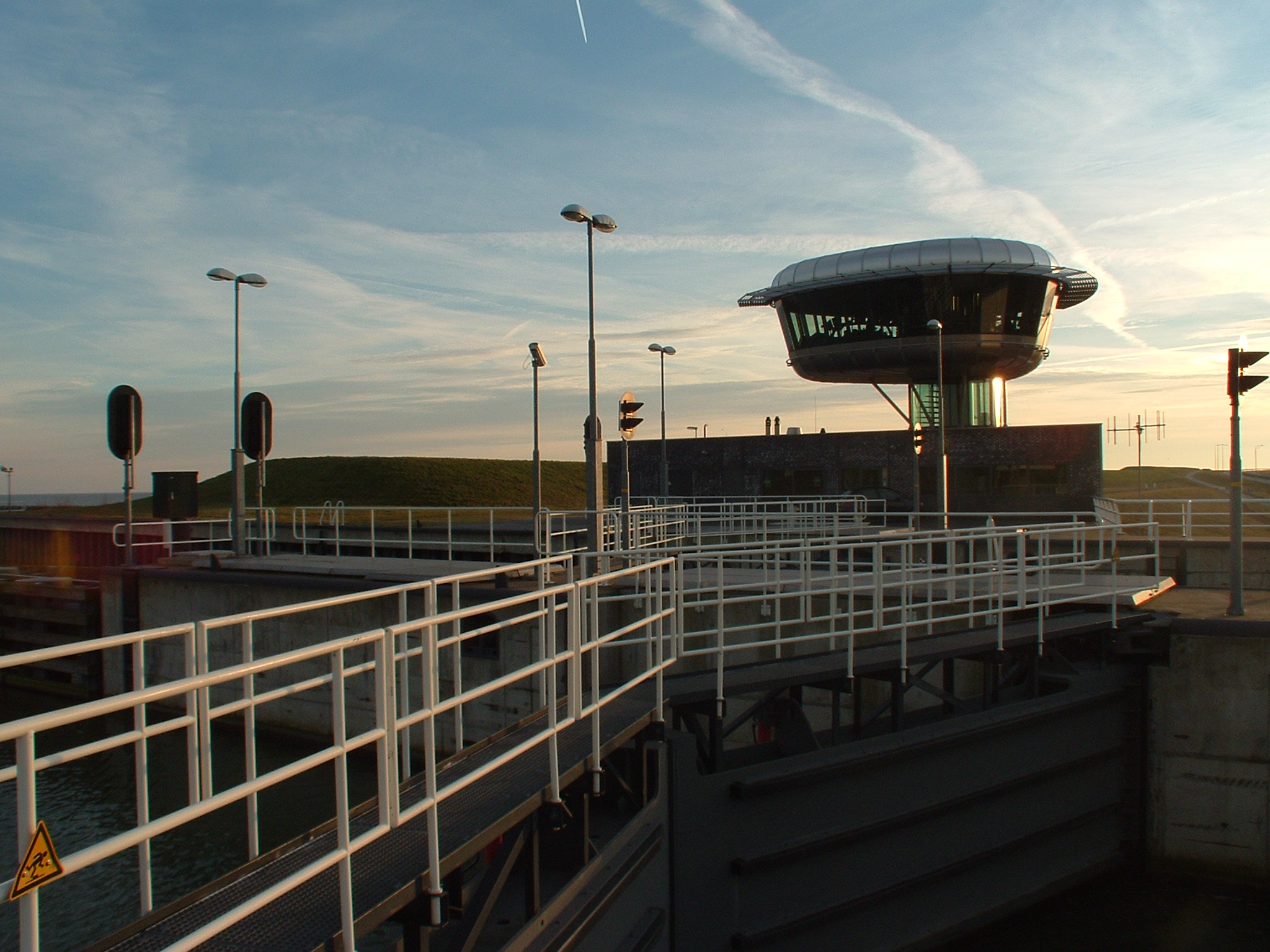
Naviduct control tower

A naviduct is a special class of navigable aqueduct, in which the waterway also includes a lock. One example of a naviduct has been built at Enkhuizen on the Houtribdijk in the Netherlands on the instructions of the Rijkswaterstaat. This cost over €55 million and was completed in 2003. It is big enough to simultaneously transfer two large Rhine river-barges from the Markermeer to the IJsselmeer or vice versa. The structure was chosen because a busy waterway crosses a dam carrying a busy road, but the space available for separate aqueduct and lock facilities was restricted.

== Name and definition ==
The term is derived from the words for navigation and aqueduct, which are in turn partly derived from the Latin words navis meaning ship and ducere meaning to lead or conduct. It can also be thought of as a lock system with an underpass under the lock for road traffic. The term is introduced and used extensively in the Netherlands for referring to the works near Enkhuizen in Dutch and English language texts.

== Krabbersgat Naviduct ==
The world's only operational naviduct is near Enkhuizen, and is part of works commissioned in 1995 and administered in the Netherlands by the Rijkswaterstaat. This location is at the western end of the Houtribdijk in the province of Flevoland, which separates the Markermeer from the IJsselmeer. This dam was built as a possible northern dike to build the Markerwaard polder in 1975. Although construction of this polder has been permanently shelved and was officially abandoned in 2003, the dam is still called a dike. Until the building of the naviduct, marine transport between the two lakes had to cross the dike at the Krabbersgat lock (near Enkhuizen) or the Houtrib lock (near Lelystad) due to the differing lake levels. The two lakes have the same target level, but wind surge and feed flows affect the two water bodies differently. Without a lock on the naviduct, the flow of water through the aqueduct could become too high for navigation. Highway N302 runs along the dike between the two towns, with bascule bridges at the two lock locations. Prior to the official opening of the naviduct at 11am on 26 April 2003 by Roelf de Boer, delays often arose for both road and water traffic, which could not pass the lock location simultaneously, and this was a particularly acute problem at the Enkhuizen end of the dike.

=== Technical details ===
The naviduct is constructed in a specially designed polder, having an artificially managed water table depth of -12.00 m NAP. The polder is diamond-shaped with a length of 500m and a width of 160m, while its embankment is elevated to +6m NAP. The road under the naviduct reaches a depth of -10.80m NAP. The polder guide dams were built using the geotextile tube method, where porous sausage-shaped bags are pumped full of sand slurry. The slurry is dewatered as the pumps fill the bags, forming a stable structure that is subsequently covered with quarried stone.

Both locks have a length of 125 meters, a width of 12.5 meters and meet the Va requirements of the CEMT Class (i.e. each is suitable for a large Rhine river-barge). Special waterproof concrete was used for the locks, as they are designed to operate without the need for maintenance resulting from surface wear. The completed project cost €55 million before tax.

== Other naviducts ==
=== Disused ===
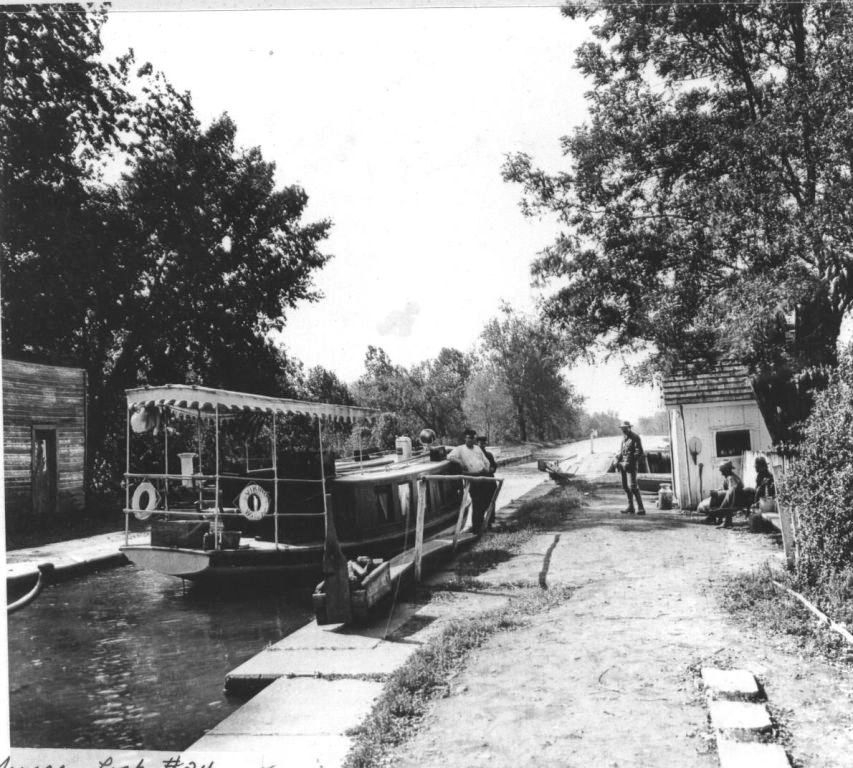
Riley's Lock (Lock 24) which doubled as the aqueduct over Seneca Creek, on the Chesapeake and Ohio Canal

The Seneca Aqueduct on the Chesapeake and Ohio Canal is a disused naviduct, consisting of a lock (Riley's Lock) and an aqueduct. The lock is located next to the aqueduct, but both are part of a single structure made out of sandstone. It was used from 1833 to 1924. One of the arches of the aqueduct collapsed in 1971, so it can no longer contain water.

=== Planned ===
The Dutch government is currently considering whether to replace some of its existing lock and opening bridge combinations with naviducts. Naviducts have a high construction cost compared to standard locks and bridges, but benefit the economy by reducing delays. The former State Secretary for Infrastructure and the Environment, Joop Atsma, issued a statement in 2012 detailing the factors influencing the decision to build a new naviduct on the Afsluitdijk at Kornwerderzand. Strengthening of the existing locks was costed at €33 million, building new locks at €91 million and a naviduct and new locks at €200-450 million, depending on the size of locks and size of highway. A naviduct would give waiting time annualised benefits of €3 million to maritime traffic and €13 million to road traffic, based on the bridge opening 7,000 times a year. Cost–benefit analysis of all potential solutions were considered, and for the present time, the locks will be strengthened. However, it is quite possible that a naviduct will be built to replace the locks when they reach the end of their useful life in 2050.
