= Creil Woods =

Former forest in the Netherlands

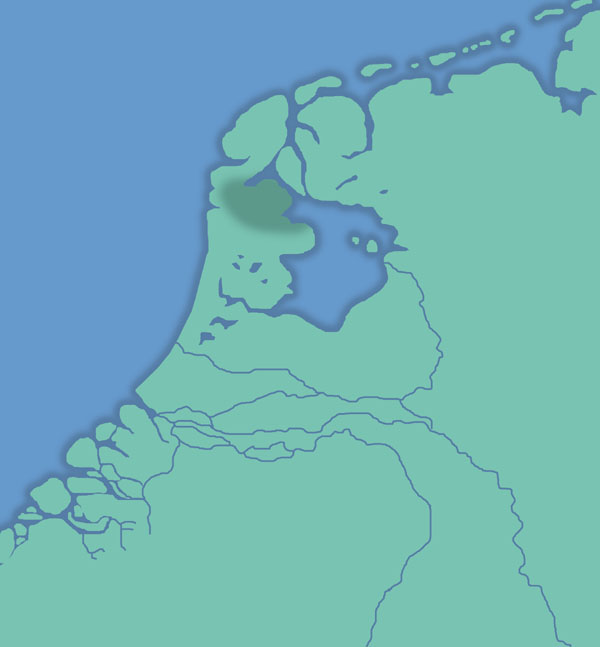
The location of the Creil Woods around the year 1000, the exact limits of the forest are unknown.

The Creil Woods Dutch: Creiler Woud or Kreilse Bos was a forest in an area that is now partially the northeast of North Holland and partially submerged in the IJsselmeer and Wadden Sea, between what is currently Texel and Enkhuizen.

== Landscape and environmental history ==
Archaeological and palaeoenvironmental research of the north-eastern Zuiderzee area indicates that this region was not only inhabited but also supported extensive terrestrial ecosystems prior to its inundation. Studies combining geological coring, sediment analysis, and historical reconstruction show that large areas consisted of peatlands with developed woodland vegetation, including alder- and willow-dominated wet forests typical of lowland environments. These forested landscapes formed part of a broader inhabited terrain that was progressively eroded and submerged between the 12th and 15th centuries due to repeated storm surges and marine incursions. As a result, remnants of former woodland, including buried tree trunks and organic layers, became preserved beneath marine sediments. In this context, the Creil Woods (Creiler Woud or Kreilse Bos) can be understood as part of this drowned forest landscape, representing a localized expression of the wider woodland ecosystems that once occupied the area before the formation of the Zuiderzee.

The woods are known for having been the location of a large hunt organised by Floris II, Count of Holland in 1119.

The 1170 All Saints' Flood largely destroyed the forest as it was submerged during the birth of the Zuiderzee.

Part of the area that the forest once inhabited has been reclaimed as the Wieringermeer Polder in 1927. Remains of the forest can still be found on the floor of the Wadden Sea and IJsselmeer.

The Creil Woods is the namesake to the towns of Creil, Kreil and Kreileroord.
