= All Saints' Flood (1170) =

Natural disaster in the Netherlands

All Saints' Flood of 1170

Meteorological history
- Date: 1–2 November 1170

Overall effects
- Areas affected: Northern Netherlands, and Holland. Marked the beginning of the expansion of the Almere and its opening to the North Sea, ultimately leading to the creation of the Zuiderzee

The All Saints' Flood of 1170 (Dutch: Allerheiligenvloed) was a catastrophic flood in the Netherlands which took place during the night of 1 to 2 November (All Saints' Day) in 1170. Large parts of the northern Netherlands were flooded. This and the subsequent Saint Nicholas' Flood in 1196, marked the beginning of the expansion of the Almere and its opening up to the North Sea, ultimately leading to the creation of the Zuiderzee and the Wadden Sea.

The Annales Egmundenses, a collection of medieval chronicles, are the only known source that reports on the flood in Kennemerland in 1170. The storm surge hit the area completely unexpectedly, resulting in livestock drowning and people having to seek refuge on the beams of their homes. Without the help of ships, most likely from the town of Diemen, to rescue the drowning victims, there would have been even more casualties. According to the Annales, the sea water was pushed up to the walls of the city of Utrecht. A sea fish (a whiting) is said to have been caught there.

The flooding created the islands of Wieringen and Texel. The Almere was once a fresh water lake, but a sea channel opened a connection from the North Sea into the lake through Creil Woods (Kreilerbos), a peat forest between Stavoren and Enkhuizen, was swept away, removing an important barrier between the Almere and the Wadden Sea and thus also to the North Sea. The Almere began to turn into the salt-water sea which became known as the Zuiderzee. By around 1248, the transformation of the lake into the Zuiderzee was complete. The sea area increased inside the Netherlands and large peat areas developed, which were easily washed away.

The flood rendered the settlement of Rotta (the predecessor of Rotterdam) uninhabitable, and marked the beginning of Amsterdam. The water level of the Almere dropped and the mouth of the Amstel river became drier, causing the river to flow and making it possible to reach other parts of the Netherlands via the IJ, which had turned from a shallow river into a wide estuary because of the floods. The area gained an open connection to the sea. The banks of the Amstel became dry enough for building, whereas previously the poorly drained peatland made human habitation in the area almost impossible, and Amsterdam eventually emerged at a junction of waterways that attracted traders from the Hanseatic cities. This was ultimately perpetuated by the construction of a dam in the Amstel between 1264 and 1275, hence the name Amestelledamme 'at the dam in the Amstel' that became Amsterdam.

== See also ==
- Floods in the Netherlands
