= Houtribdijk =

Dam in the Netherlands

Coordinates: 52°38′N 5°25′E

Markerwaarddijk
Houtribdijk
Official name	Houtribdijk
Location	N302 Enkhuizen — Lelystad
Separating	Markermeer — IJsselmeer
Total length	26 km
Width	68 m
Construction started	1963
Construction ended	1976

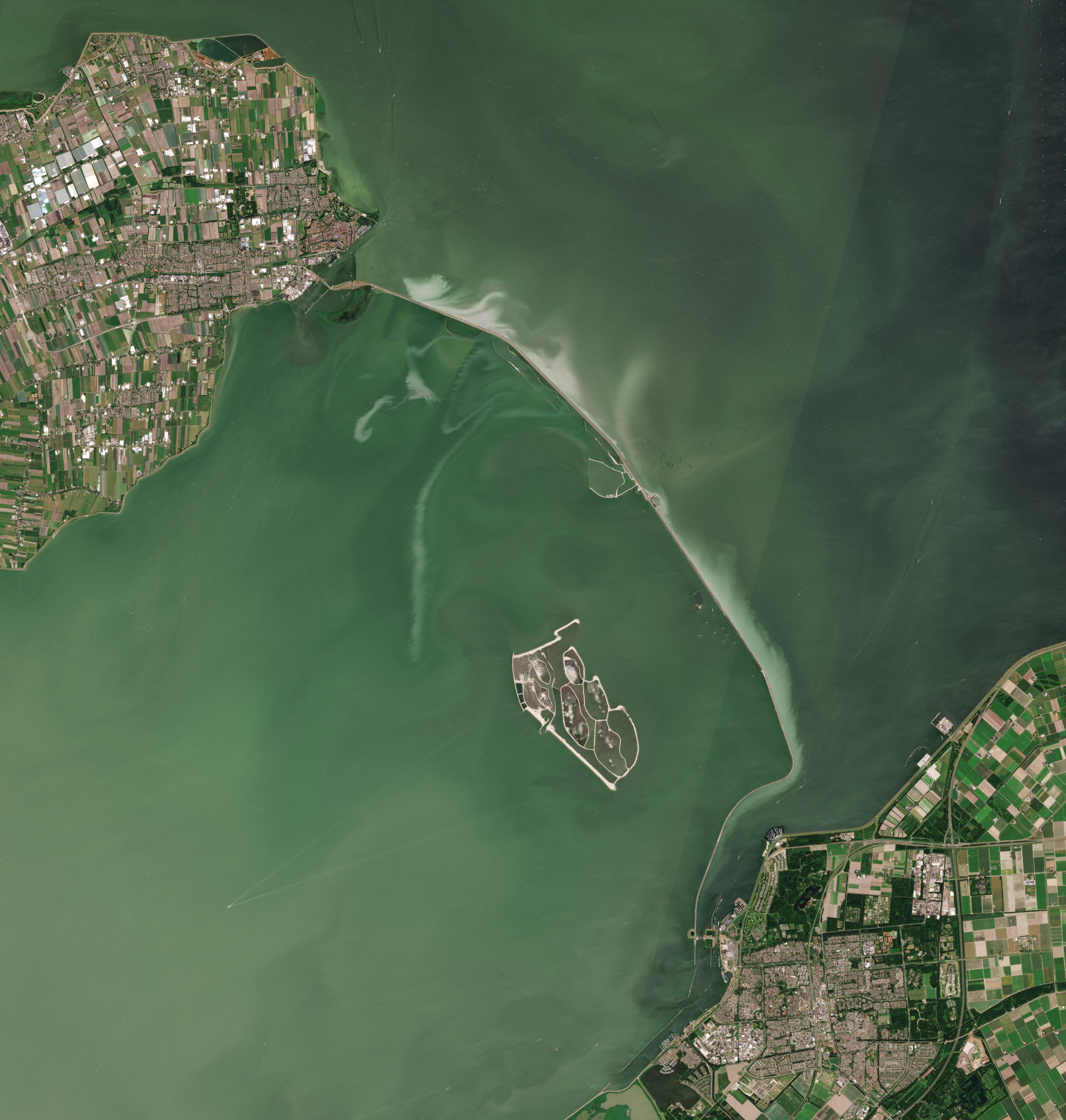
Houtribdijk, satellite image

The Houtribdijk is a dam in the Netherlands, built between 1963 and 1976 as part of the Zuiderzee Works, which connects the cities of Lelystad and Enkhuizen. On the west side of the dike is the Markermeer and on the east is the IJsselmeer. The 26-kilometer-long dike was intended for the Markerwaard, but the construction of this polder was abandoned in 2003 due to environmental concerns. The Houtribdijk was widened and reinforced between 2017 and 2020.

Although called a dike (withholding water from land area), the Houtribdijk is actually a dam (separating water bodies).

Parts of the dike are known as the Markerwaarddijk and the Lelydijk. It is also called the "Enkhuizen–Lelystad dike" (dijk Enkhuizen-Lelystad) in traffic announcements, as if it had no official name. The dike also used to be called Enkhuizerzanddijk.

== Road on the dike ==
The road that runs on the dike is the N302 and is used by 8,500 vehicles per day with a speed limit of 100 km/h. The road also features a biking path alongside the N302 on the northeastern side. Marine traffic can cross the dike at either the locks or the naviduct at Enkhuizen. Alternatively, there is a lock system at Lelystad.

== Harbor ==
About halfway along the dike there is Trintelhaven, an emergency harbor. Trintelhaven is also the site of a restaurant and an AM broadcasting station, which used to operate on 1395 kHz with 20 kW. It uses as antenna a 54-meters-tall free-standing grounded-lattice steel mast, which was built in 1999. The mast carries a wire antenna, which runs up the tower and is fixed to a horizontal cross on the top of the tower.

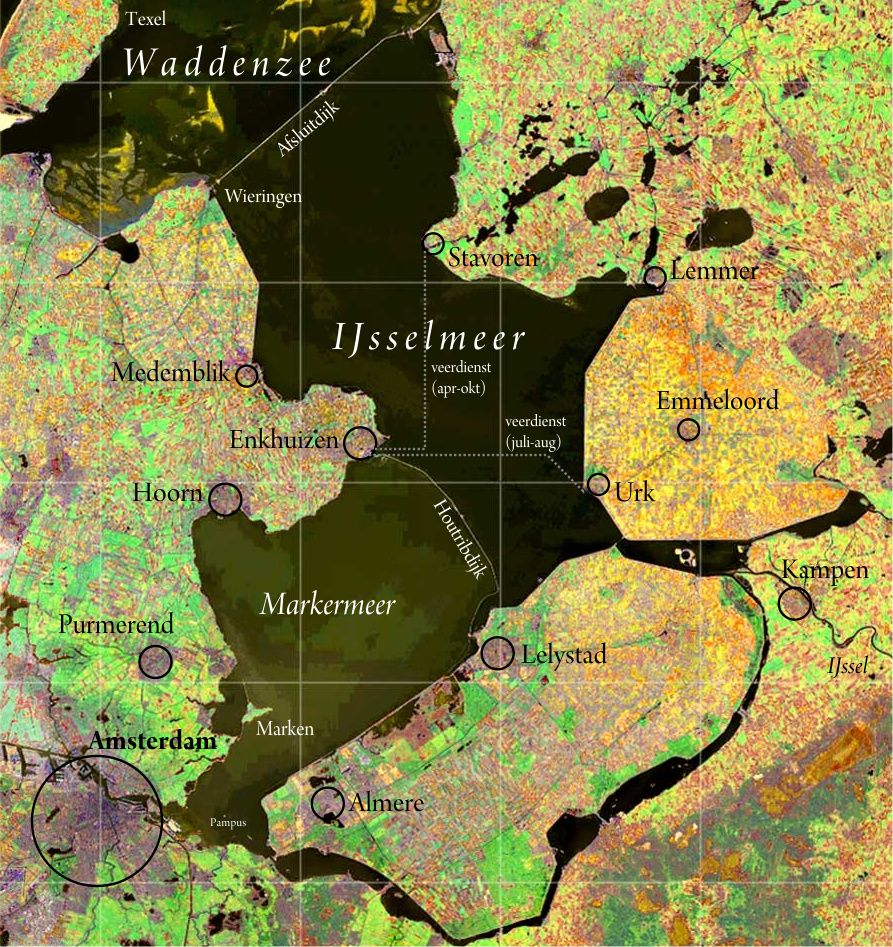
The Houtribdijk separates the Markermeer from the IJsselmeer. The dike in the north is the Afsluitdijk.

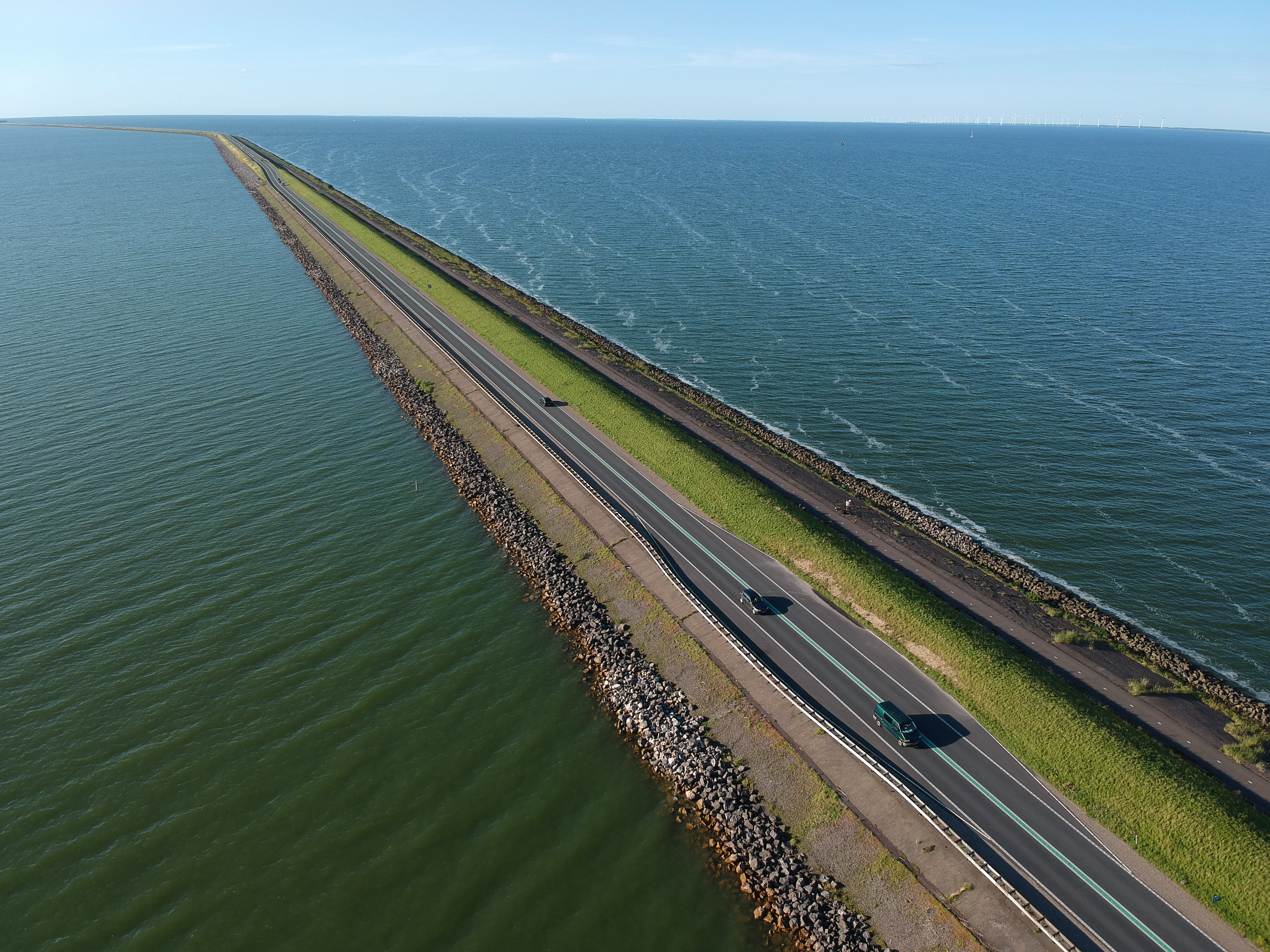
The Houtribdijk near Lelystad.
