= Flood of 1916 =

Zuiderzee flood in the Netherlands

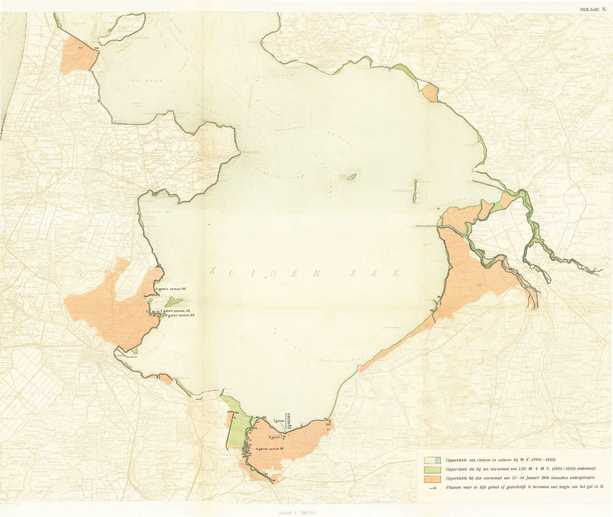
This map shows inundated areas due to the flood of 15 January 1916, reported by the Dutch government in September 1916

The flood of 1916 or Zuiderzeevloed of 1916 is a flood that took place from the night of 13 January to the morning of 14 January 1916 in the Netherlands along the dikes of the Zuiderzee as a result of a storm surge.

== Course ==
The flood coincided with a high water inflow of rivers, causing many ruptures and structural damage in levees at dozens of places along the coastline. Some wooden houses on the island of Marken completely tumbled over. In the province North Holland, 19 people were killed, while at sea, several ships were wrecked causing another 32 casualties. Queen Wilhelmina visited the areas that were affected.

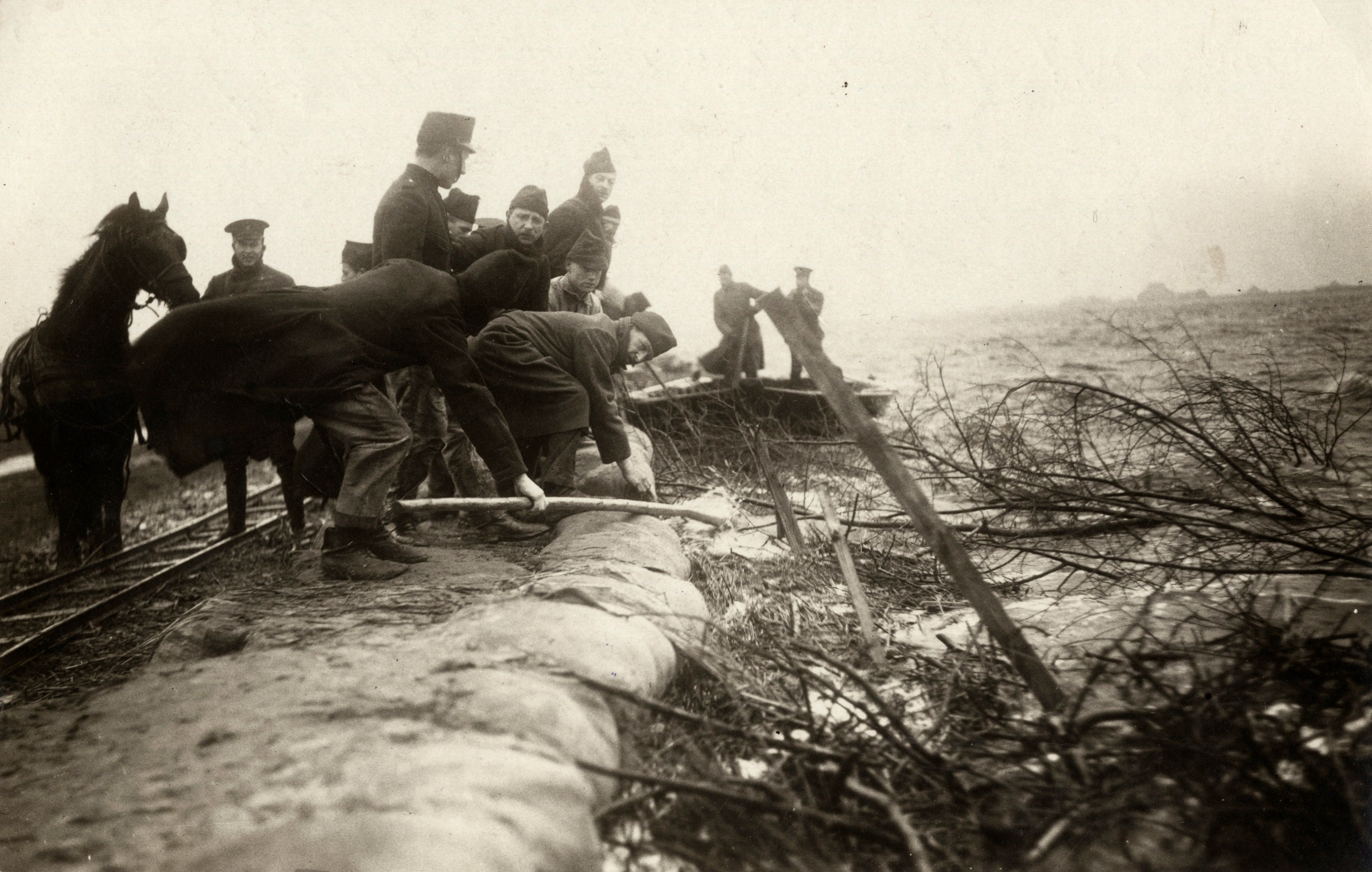
Soldiers and civilians have taken action to build temporary dikes using sandbags.

== Consequences ==
This disaster, in combination with the famine caused by the First World War, led to a law called the Zuiderzeewet. The reinforcement of the levees, undertaken after the disaster, was finished in 1926. In 1932, the Zuiderzee was 'tamed' by constructing a 32-kilometre-long levee, a barrage called the Afsluitdijk. For the fishermen, this also led to the end of their fishing activities.

== Foreign help ==
Based on the correspondence in The Hague between the ambassador of Turkey to the government of the Netherlands, the Turks donated a sum of FL 2387.90 (equivalent of about €20,000 now) to the Netherlands in aid for the victims of the flood.
