= Kreil, Netherlands =

Creil
- Hamlet
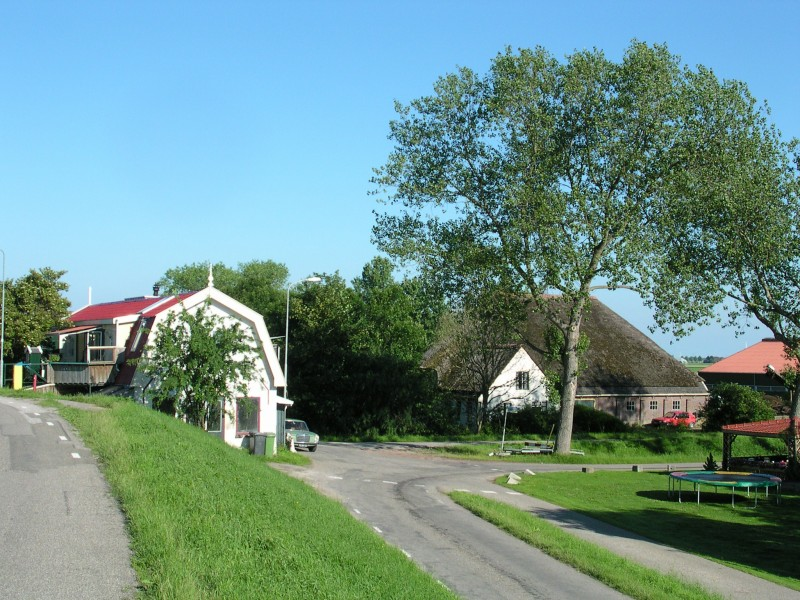

- Location of Kreil in the province of North Holland
- Coordinates: 52.800939°N 4.866850°E
- Country: Netherlands
- Province: North Holland
- Municipality: Hollands Kroon
- Elevation: 0 m (0 ft)

Population
  - Total: ca. 20
- Time zone: UTC+1 (CET)
  - Summer (DST): UTC+2 (CEST)
- Postcode: 1768
- Area code: 0224

Kreil is a hamlet in the Dutch province North Holland, it is located on the Westfriese Omringdijk (West-Frisian Circular Dyke) in the municipality Hollands Kroon.

Before the formation of the Hollands Kroon municipality, half of the village was in the municipality of Anna Paulowna and the other half was in the municipality of Wieringermeer
