= Marker Wadden =

Artificial archipelago in the Netherlands

- Location in the Markermeer
- Location: Municipality of Lelystad, Flevoland, Netherlands
- Coordinates: 52°35′N 5°23′E

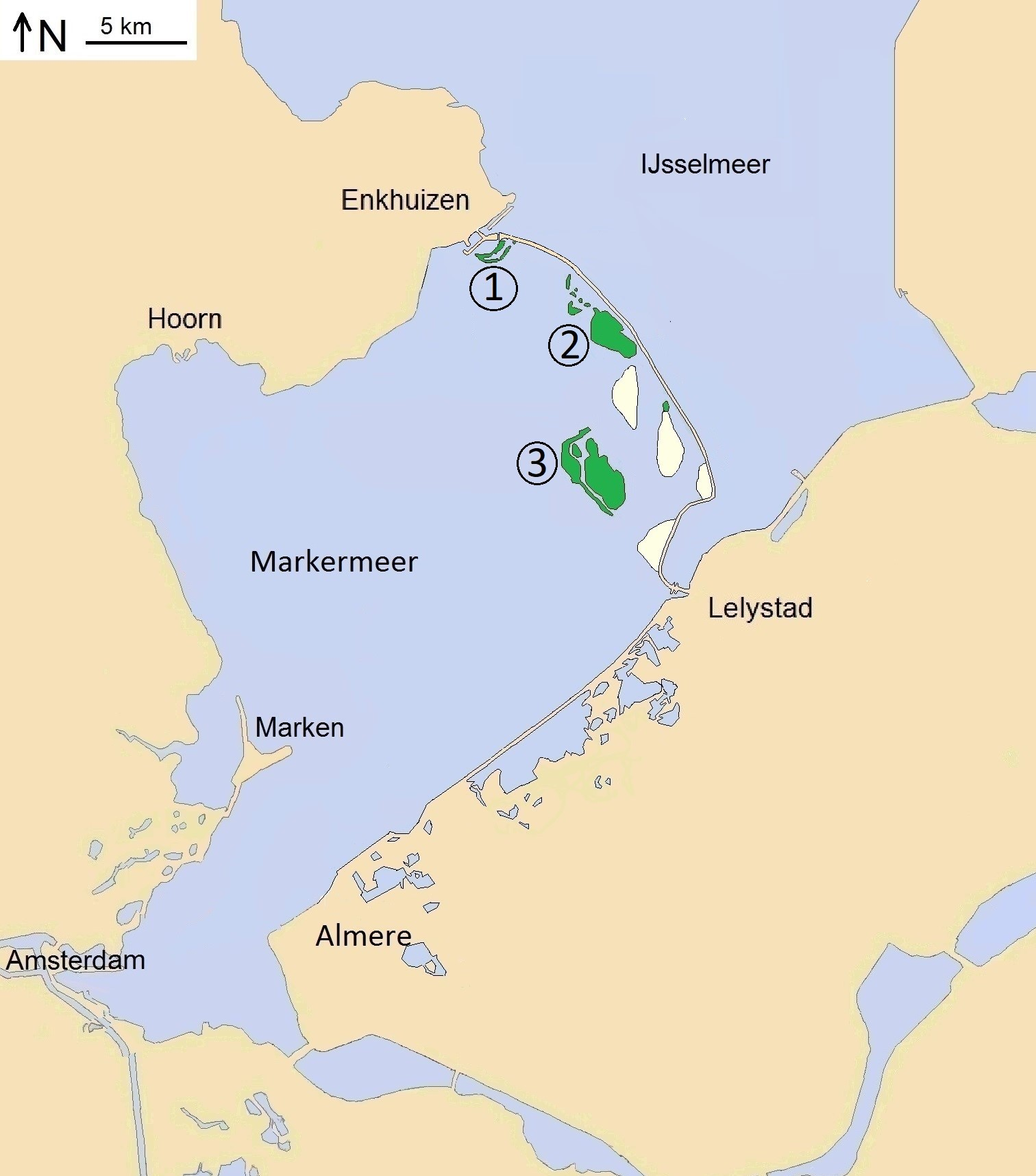
Artificial islands of the Markermeer 1 = prototype 2 = Trintelzand 3 = Marker Wadden in pale = proposed islands (in 2022).

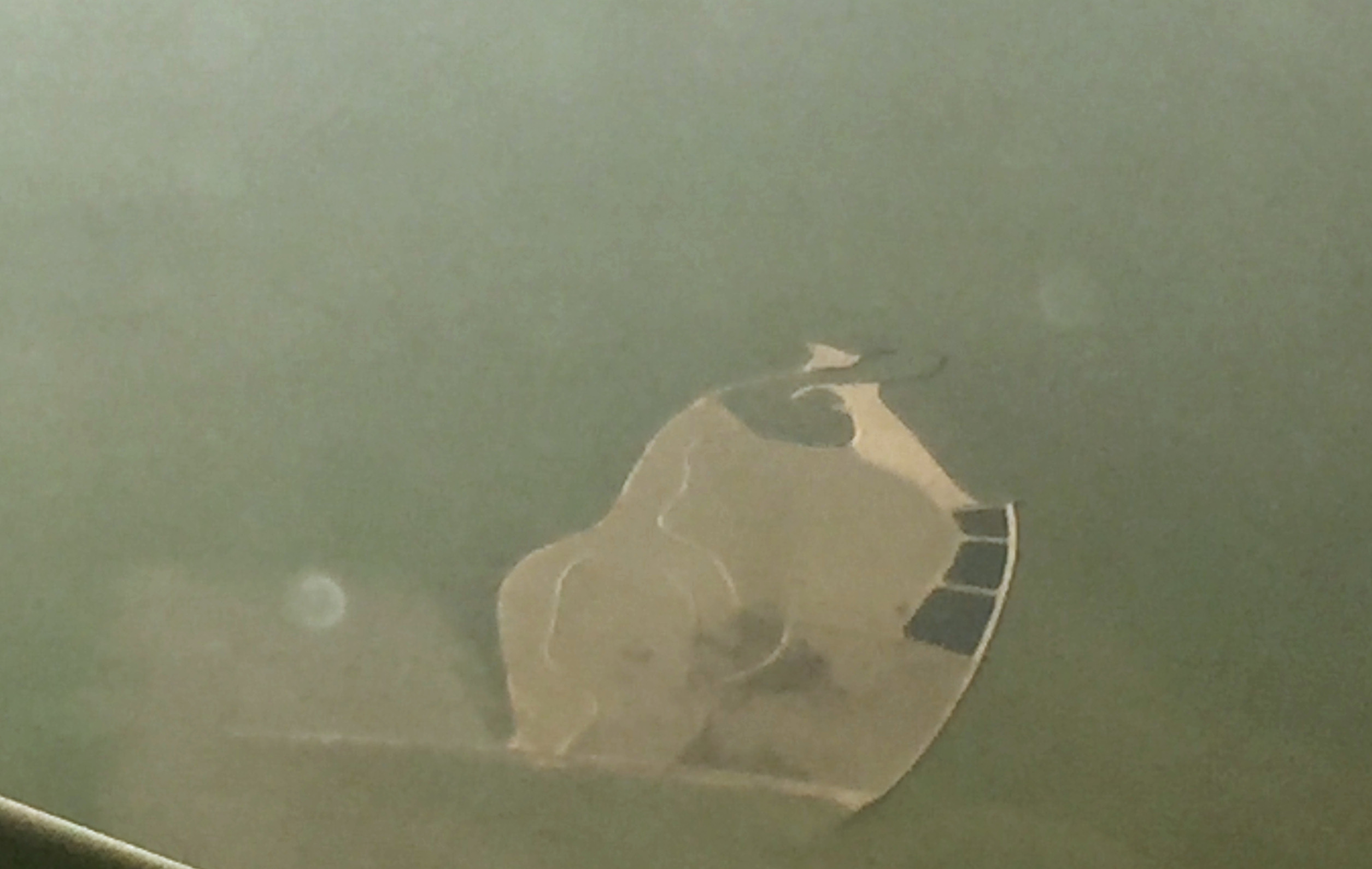
The first island seen from an airplane in 2017, still a virgin island

The Marker Wadden is an artificial archipelago developed in the Markermeer between 2016 and 2021, a lake in the Netherlands. The first island was inaugurated on 24 September 2016. It is a nature reserve alternative to the much bigger proposed Markerwaard polder that was begun in 1941, but paused following World War II and finally canceled in 2003.

== Project ==
The project was proposed in 2012 by the Vereniging Natuurmonumenten. The Dutch government, BirdLife Netherlands, ANWB, and VNO-NCW are partners in its development.

Work on the first phase, which is mainly focused on the construction of the first island, started in April 2016, with Royal Boskalis being awarded the contract.

The main aims of the project are to create breeding grounds, islands, and coast line as well as to improve the water ecology of the Markermeer. The project creates a wetland comparable with the Wadden Sea—hence the name of the project—yet without tides. This is because the Markermeer is not connected to the sea and is in a fresh water environment. The nature reserve is accessible to tourists. There is a ferry service from the city of Lelystad, itself a city built on reclaimed IJsselmeer land.

On 11 May 2016, the first new island was completed, Natuurmonumenten called this a "milestone". In March 2017, it was announced that four other islands should be completed before 2020.

== Flora and fauna ==
The islands have been colonized by large numbers of breeding birds. A colony of 200 breeding pairs of pied avocet has made the islands their home, as has a large colony of common tern. Little terns also breed on the islands. Northern shoveler, gadwall, garganey, Mediterranean gull, spoonbill, long-tailed duck and numerous other species of birds have been seen on and around the islands.

== Participants ==
Contributions: Dutch government €19,000,000.

== Controversy ==
The ecologist Wouter van Dieren claimed he first had the idea in 1996 and talks about "plagiarism".

== Events ==
In March 2024 Marker Wadden was the focus of a 50-strong scientific ecological conference investigating aspects of water ecology and coastal science organised by the Netherlands Centre for Coastal Research.
