= Zuiderzee =

Former inland sea in the Netherlands, now the IJsselmeer

Coordinates: 52°42′N 05°24′E

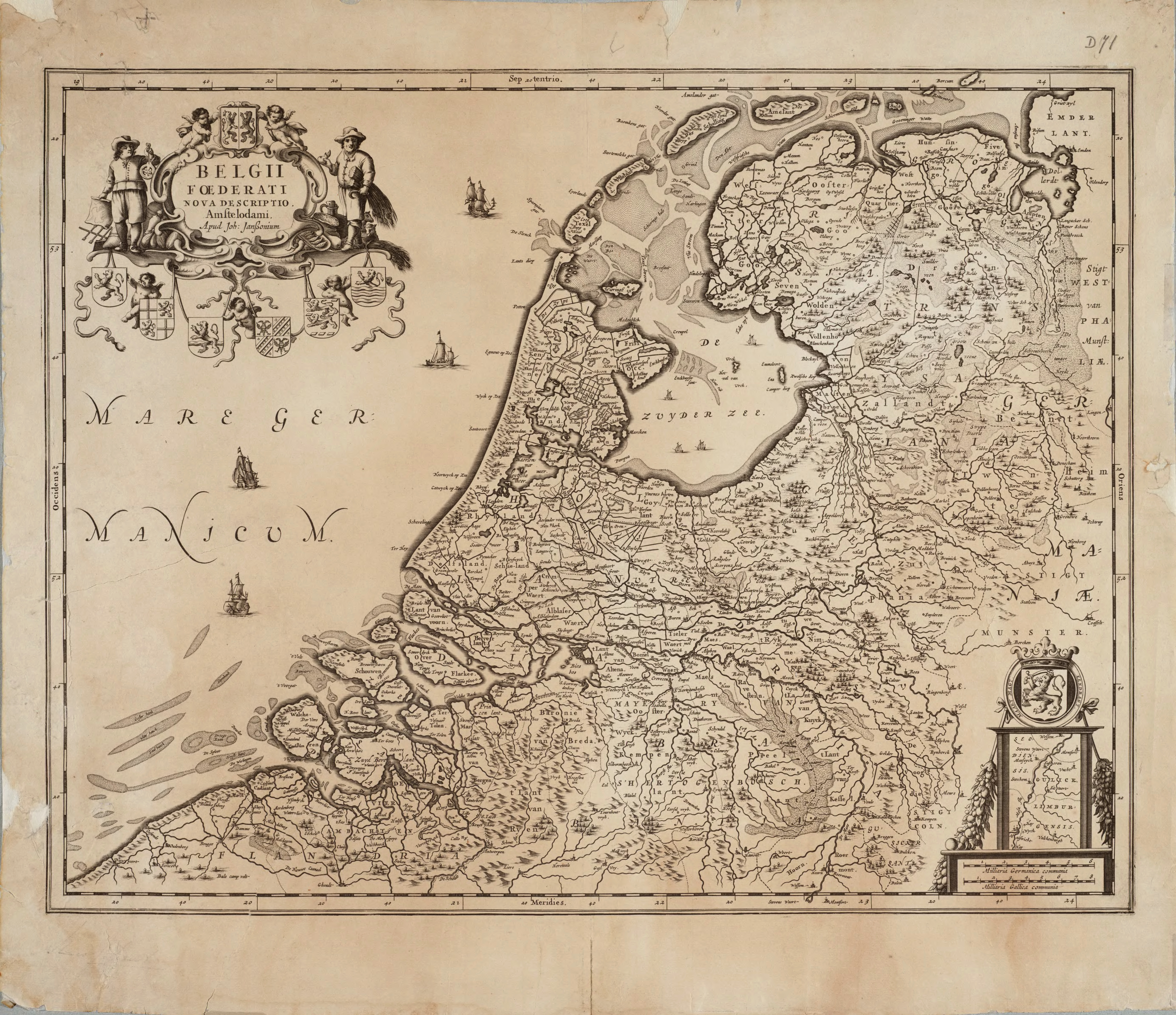
Historical map of the Netherlands (1658) with the Zuyder Zee

The Zuiderzee or Zuider Zee (Dutch: [ˌzœy.dər.ˈzeː]; old spelling Zuyderzee or Zuyder Zee), historically called Lake Almere and Lake Flevo, was a shallow bay of the North Sea in the northwest of the Netherlands. It extended about 100 km (62 mi) inland and at most 50 km (31 mi) wide, with an overall depth of about 4 to 5 m (13 to 16 ft) and a coastline of about 300 km (190 mi). It covered 5,000 km^{2} (1,900 sq mi). Its name is Dutch for "southern sea", indicating that the name originates in Friesland, to the north of the Zuiderzee (cf. North Sea).

It is generally acknowledged that the Zuiderzee existed from roughly 1170, following the devastating All Saints' Flood, until 1932, when the Afsluitdijk was completed. The majority of the Zuiderzee was closed off from the North Sea, leaving the mouth of the inlet to become part of the Wadden Sea. The salt water inlet changed into a fresh water lake now called the IJsselmeer (IJssel Lake) after the river that drains into it, and by means of drainage and polders, an area of some 1,500 km^{2} (580 sq mi) was reclaimed as land. This land eventually became the province of Flevoland. Part of the IJsselmeer was also divided into the Markermeer.

== History ==
=== Lake Flevo ===
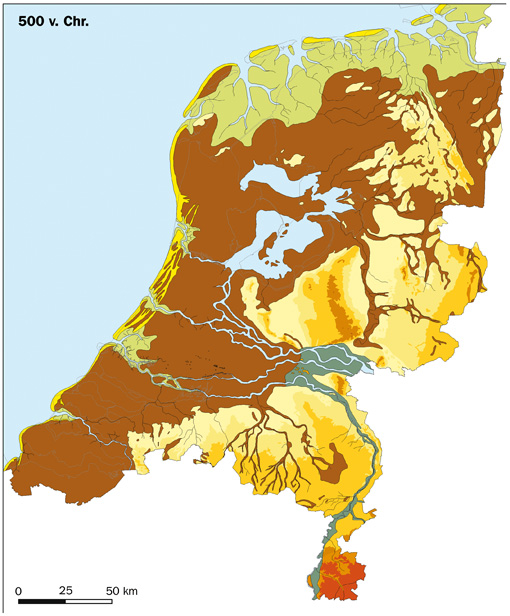
The present-day Netherlands c. 500 BC.

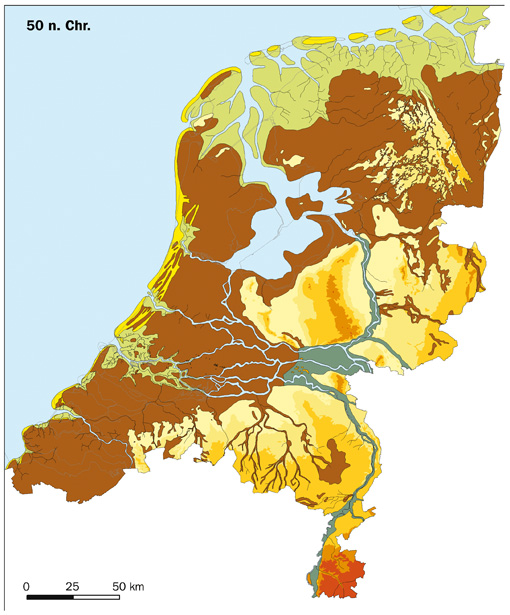
The present-day Netherlands c. 50 AD.

In classical times the body of water at this location was called Lake Flevo (Flevo Lacus) by Roman authors. This was the central and largest lake in a region filled with a mixture of lowland and freshwater lakes occupying the area later filled by the Zuiderzee. It was separated from the sea by a belt of marsh and fen; at that time, the coastline ran along the line of the Frisian Islands. A number of streams, including the Vecht, Eem, and IJssel, fed into the lake. The lake itself fed out into the North Sea through the Vlie (Latin: Flevus). It existed in Roman times and the early Middle Ages.

From the Indo-European root *plew- "flow", the name was transmitted by the Roman geographer Pomponius Mela in describing this region. In his treatise on geography of 44 AD, Pomponius speaks of a Flevo Lacus. He writes: "The northern branch of the Rhine widens as Lake Flevo, and encloses an island of the same name, and then as a normal river flows to the sea". Other sources rather speak of Flevum, which could be related to today's Vlie (Vliestroom), i.e. the seaway between the Dutch islands of Vlieland and Terschelling. This last name is grammatically more probable for a geographical indication, which is why it is assumed that Pomponius confused the declension of the word giving the name Flevo. In fact the Vlie formed outfall from the lake into the North Sea.

In the second half of the twentieth century the Flevopolders and a new province, Flevoland, took the name of the body of water which lay there long ago.

Over time these lakes gradually eroded their soft peat shores and spread (a process known as waterwolf). Some part of this area of water was later called the Vlie; it probably flowed into the sea through what is now the Vliestroom channel between the islands of Vlieland and Terschelling.

During a period of rising sea level between 250 and 600 CE, the connection to the sea and the lake were significantly enlarged. A period of lower sea levels followed.

=== Almere ===
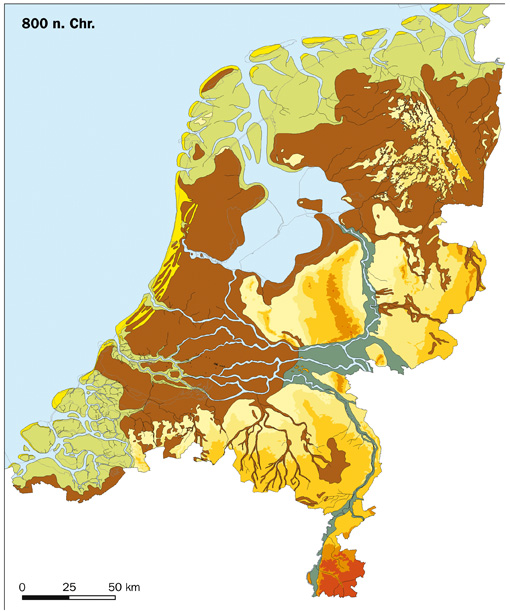
The present-day Netherlands c. 800 AD. At that time, the lake was called Almere.

Lake Almere is mentioned among others in a life of saints written by Anglo-Saxon Bishop Saint Boniface in 753, and a deed of gift from the town of Urk. Its etymology may be eels, in Dutch aal or ael, so: ael mere = "eel lake". Presumably, the water of Lake Almere at that time was fresh water or slightly brackish. The name of the new town of Almere in Flevoland was given in 1984 in memory of this body of water.

A number of occurrences during the Middle Ages led to the transformation of the lake to an inland sea that would be called the Zuiderzee, which are:

- rising sea levels due to global warming known as the Medieval Warm Period.
- excavation of peat by the Frisians in West Friesland near the Vlie, a river that connected lake Almere to the North Sea.
- floods such as the All Saints' Flood (1170).

The Marsdiep between Den Helder and Texel was once a river (fluvium Maresdeop) which may have been a distributary of the Vlie. During the early Middle Ages this began to change as rising sea levels and storms started to eat away at the coastal areas which consisted mainly of peatlands. In this period the inlet was referred to as the Almere, indicating it was still more of a lake, but the mouth and size of the inlet were much widened in the 12th century and especially after the disastrous All Saints' Flood (1170) and subsequent floods broke through the barrier dunes near Texel and The land between Stavoren, Texel, and Medemblik was washed away around 1170. The disaster marked the rise of Amsterdam on the southwestern end of the bay, since traders from the Hanseatic cities could now reach the area.

=== Zuiderzee ===
The formation of the Zuiderzee was a gradual process, influenced by several storm surges in 1163/64, 1170, 1173, and especially the Saint Nicholas' Flood of 1196, which completed much of what the earlier floods had set in motion. Human activities – particularly agriculture and peat extraction – are regarded as the primary drivers of the change, as they caused land subsidence through peat oxidation and erosion. In the 13th century, additional storm surges (1214, 1219, 1220, 1221, 1246, 1248) further shaped the region, which developed into an extensive tidal-flat area with Texel, Wieringen, Huisduinen, and Callantsoog as islands. Around 1400, the Zuiderzee had reached its full extent, although it was still only two to three meters deep. In the south and east, the devastation was halted by the high sandy shores of the Gooi, the Veluwe, Voorst, and Gaasterland.

The size of this inland sea remained largely stable from the 15th century onwards due to improvements in dikes, but when storms pushed North Sea water into the inlet, the Zuiderzee became a volatile cauldron of water, frequently resulting in flooding and the loss of ships. For example, on 18 November 1421, a seawall at the Zuiderzee dike broke, which flooded 72 villages and killed about 10,000 people. This was the Second St. Elizabeth's flood.

The process of creating polders had developed to a point by 1667 that the damming of the Zuiderzee was proposed, although a feasible method did not appear until the 20th century.

The Netherlands was part of the First French Empire between 1810 and 1813. A département was formed in 1811 and named as Zuyderzée after the Zuiderzee, whose territory roughly corresponded to the present provinces of North Holland and Utrecht.

In 1928, the 6-meter and 8-meter sailing events for the Amsterdam Summer Olympics were held on the Zuiderzee.

=== Zuiderzee Works ===
Map of the Zuiderzee Works in the Netherlands

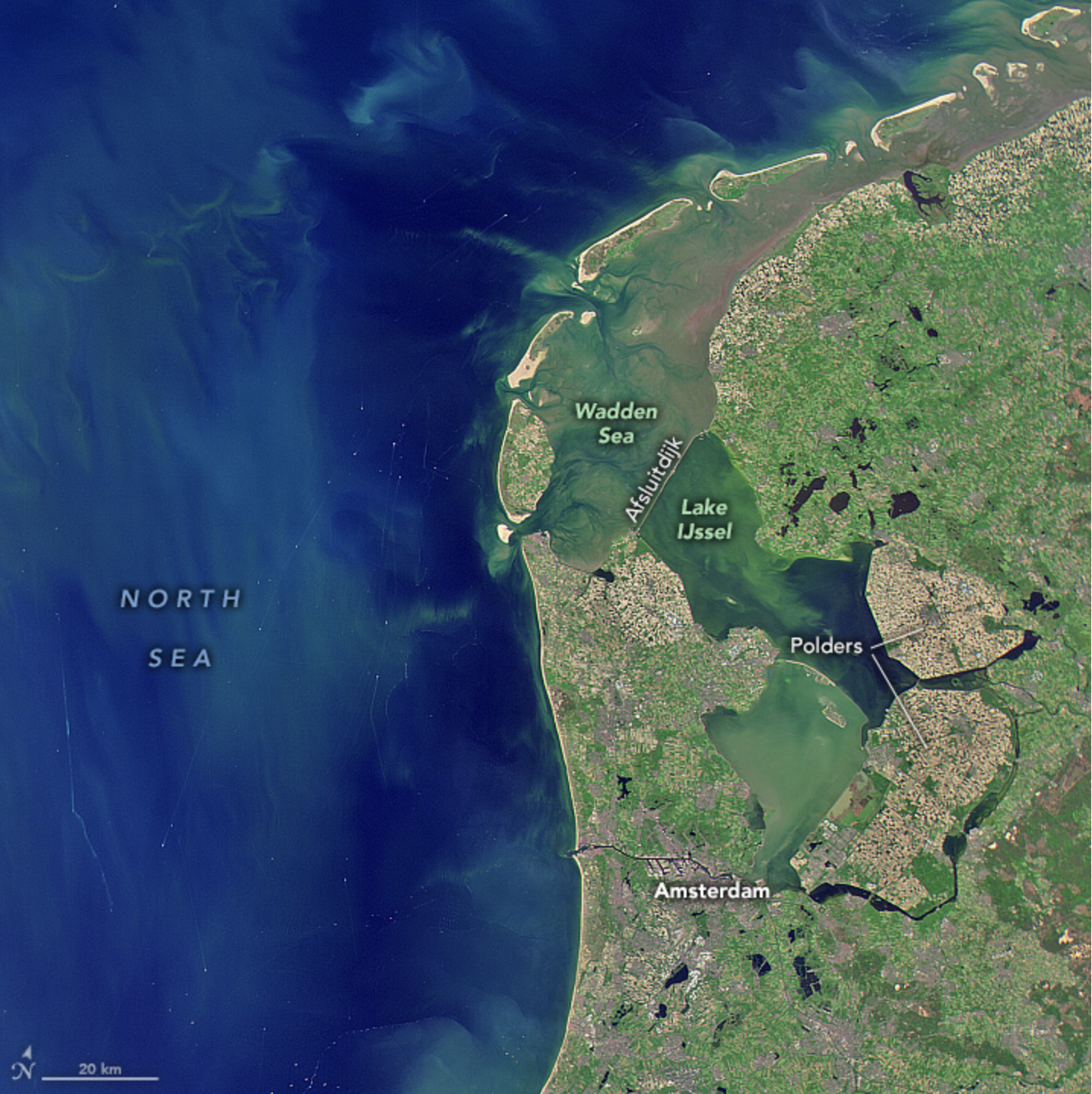
Satellite view of the modern region, with parts of the Zuiderzee Works annotated

The construction between 1927 and 1932 of a 19-mile long dam (the Afsluitdijk), under plans originating from Cornelius Lely, enclosed the Zuiderzee. The creation of this dam was hastened by the Flood of January 1916. Plans for closing the Zuiderzee had been made over thirty years earlier but had not yet passed in parliament. With the completion of the Afsluitdijk in 1932, the Zuiderzee became the IJsselmeer, and the outer portion of the Zuiderzee became the Wadden Sea. Large areas of land, mainly for agricultural use, were subsequently reclaimed from the water through the construction of polders with dams, pumping, and other hydrological technology. Four had been built by the early 1980s. They were the Wieringermeer Polder built in 1930; the Northeast (Noordoost) Polder, built in 1942; the East (Oostelijk) Flevoland Polder, built in 1957; and the South (Zuidelijk) Flevoland Polder, completed in 1968. A fifth, Markerwaard, began construction in 1963, and became partially complete, but was abandoned in the mid-1980s. Collectively, this system of dams, dikes, and polders is called the Zuiderzee Works.

== Geography ==
Around the Zuiderzee many fishing villages grew up and several developed into walled towns with extensive trade connections, in particular Kampen, a town in Overijssel, and later also towns in Holland such as Amsterdam, Hoorn, and Enkhuizen. These towns traded at first with ports on the Baltic Sea, in England, and in the Hanseatic League, but later also with the rest of the world when the Netherlands established its colonial empire. When that lucrative trade diminished, most of the towns fell back on fishing and some industry until the 20th century when tourism became the major source of income.

Contained within the Zuiderzee were five small islands, the remains of what were once larger islands, peninsulas connected to the mainland, or in the case of Pampus, an artificial island. These were Wieringen, Urk, Schokland, Pampus and Marken. The inhabitants of these islands also subsisted mainly on fishing and related industries and still do in the case of Urk and Wieringen. All of these islands, except for Pampus, are now part of the mainland or connected to it.
