= Markerwaard =

Proposed land reclamation in the Netherlands

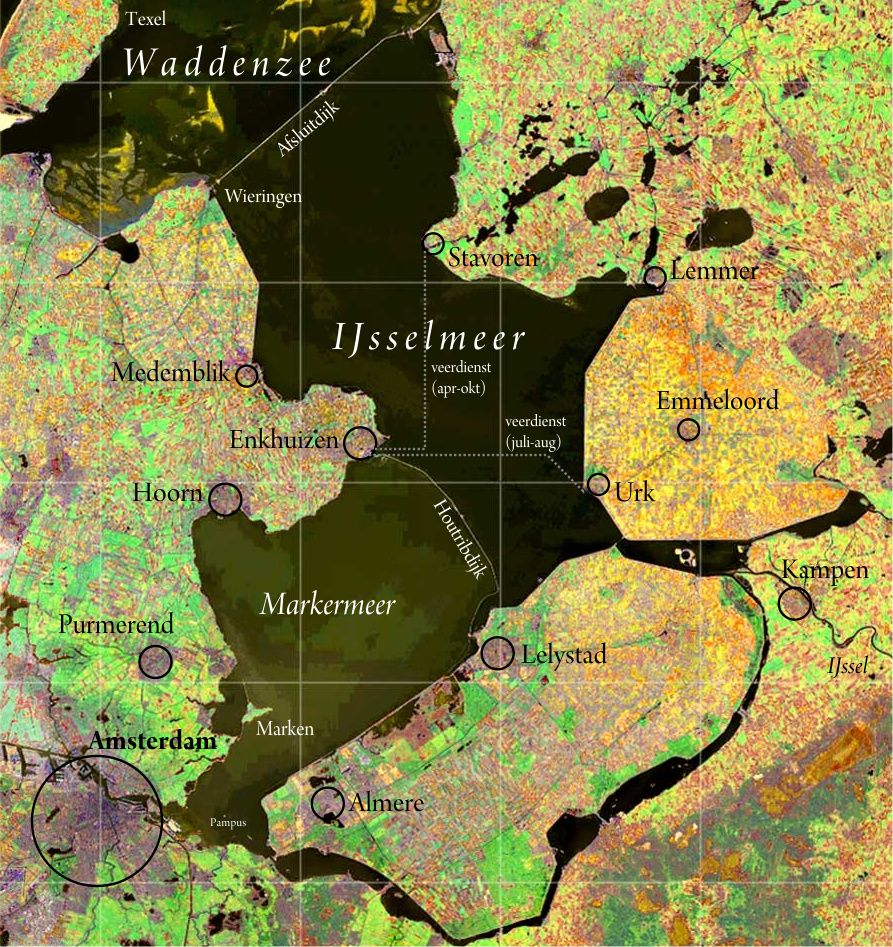
The Markerwaard would be on what is now the Markermeer

The Markerwaard is the name of a proposed, but never built, polder adjoining the IJsselmeer in the central Netherlands. Its construction would have resulted in the near-total reclamation of the Markermeer.

Cornelis Lely's plan projected a polder in the south-west of the Zuiderzee, originally named Hoornsche Polder, referring to Hoorn, then simply "Southwest Polder". Later the name was changed to Markerwaard Polder, after the island of Marken. However, reclamation of three other polders took place first, and preparations for the Markerwaard were being made while draining of the northeast and southeast polders (today's Flevoland) were underway.

In 1941 work for this project started; about 2 km (1¼ miles) of a dike north of Marken was built. It would have had an area of nearly 600 km^{2} (200 sq. mi.). Later, it was decided that the Flevopolder should have priority. In 1957, the island of Marken was connected to mainland Holland. In 1976 the dam Houtribdijk connecting Enkhuizen and Lelystad was completed, a necessary step in the construction of Markerwaard, the dikes for the bordering lakes were still to be completed. However the entire project became mired in political and environmental controversy. In the late 1970s, the project was revised down leaving wide bordering lakes between the polder and North Holland. Marken would remain a peninsula, unlike on the original project. At this stage, the Markerwaard would have had an area of 410 km^{2} (160 sq. mi.).

As of 1961 Markerwaard was expected to be finished in 1978. The debate on a final decision regarding it took over twenty years. The questions concerned the need, on one side, for more agricultural areas, new residential subdivisions, and a new airport (to relieve pressure on Schiphol). On the other side of the debate were primarily ecological issues, with the argument that the value of the lake as a recreation area was considered by some to be stronger than the potential benefits of the polder. Additionally, it was argued that, in case of drought, the lake would be very useful for the production of drinking water, and that in heavy weather, the lake serves as a buffer zone.

Finally, in 2003, it was decided not to build this polder. However discussions never completely closed.

In 2012, plans emerged to create the Marker Wadden, a group of islands designed to establish nature reserves in the north of the Markermeer. In contrast to the Markerwaard, no human occupation is planned. The creation process began in early 2016.

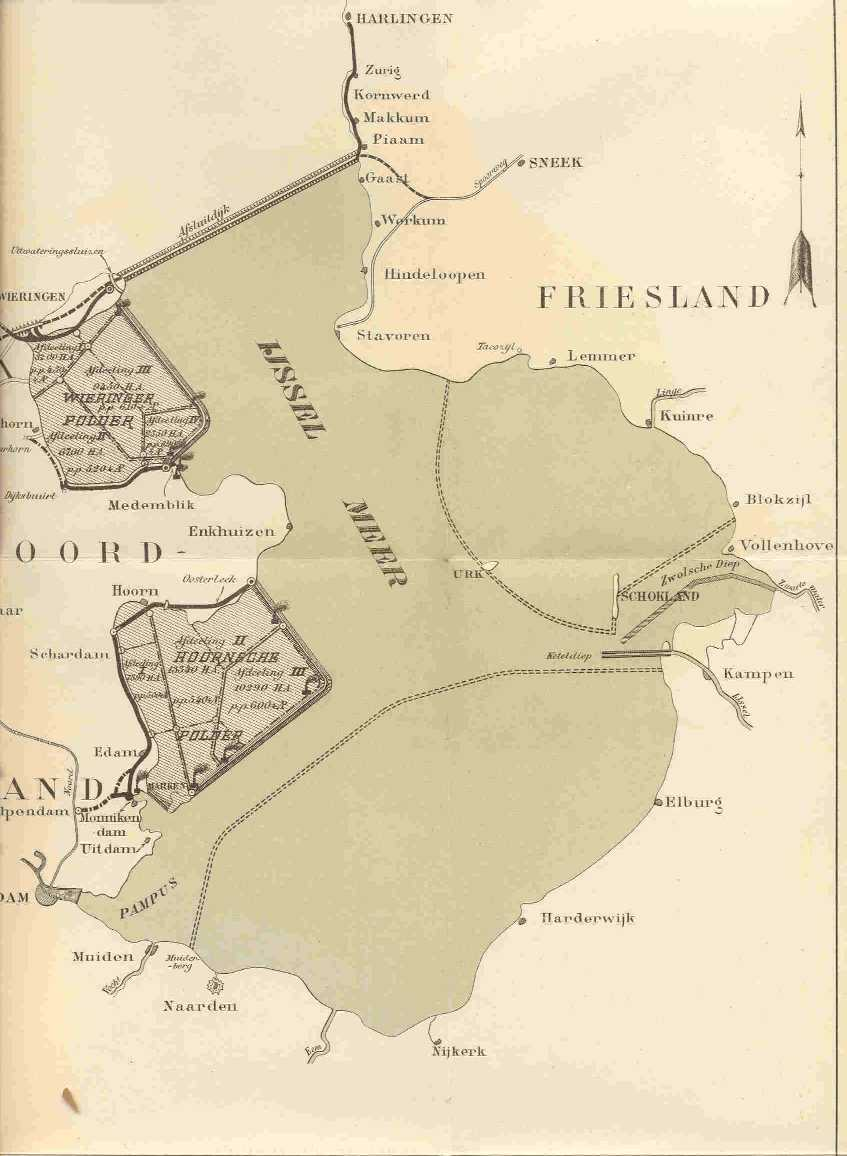
An early project of 1891 by Lely, with no bordering lakes, the polder is called the Hoornsche Polder.

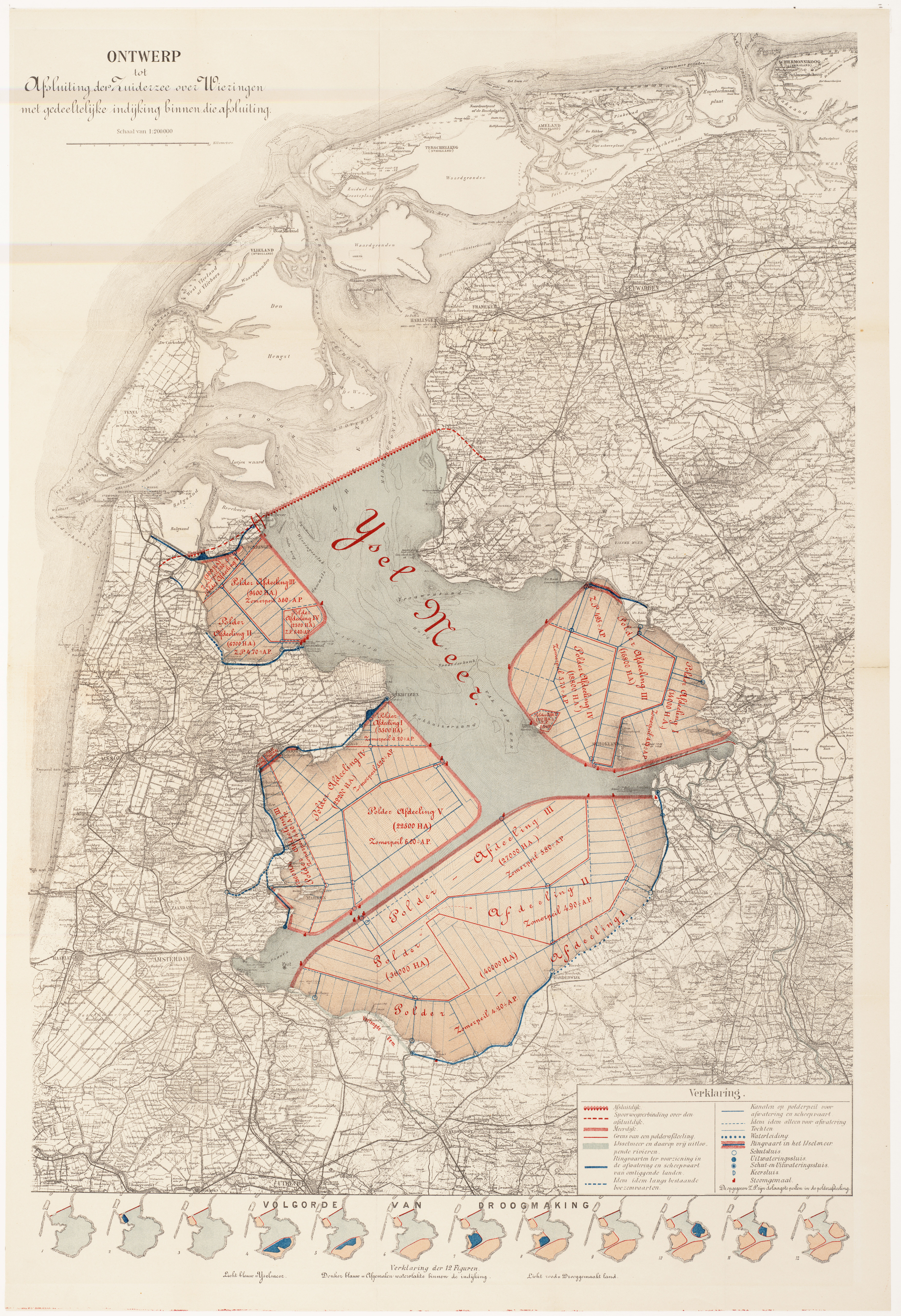
Sketch Design of the Zuiderzee Works by Cornelis Lely, 1891

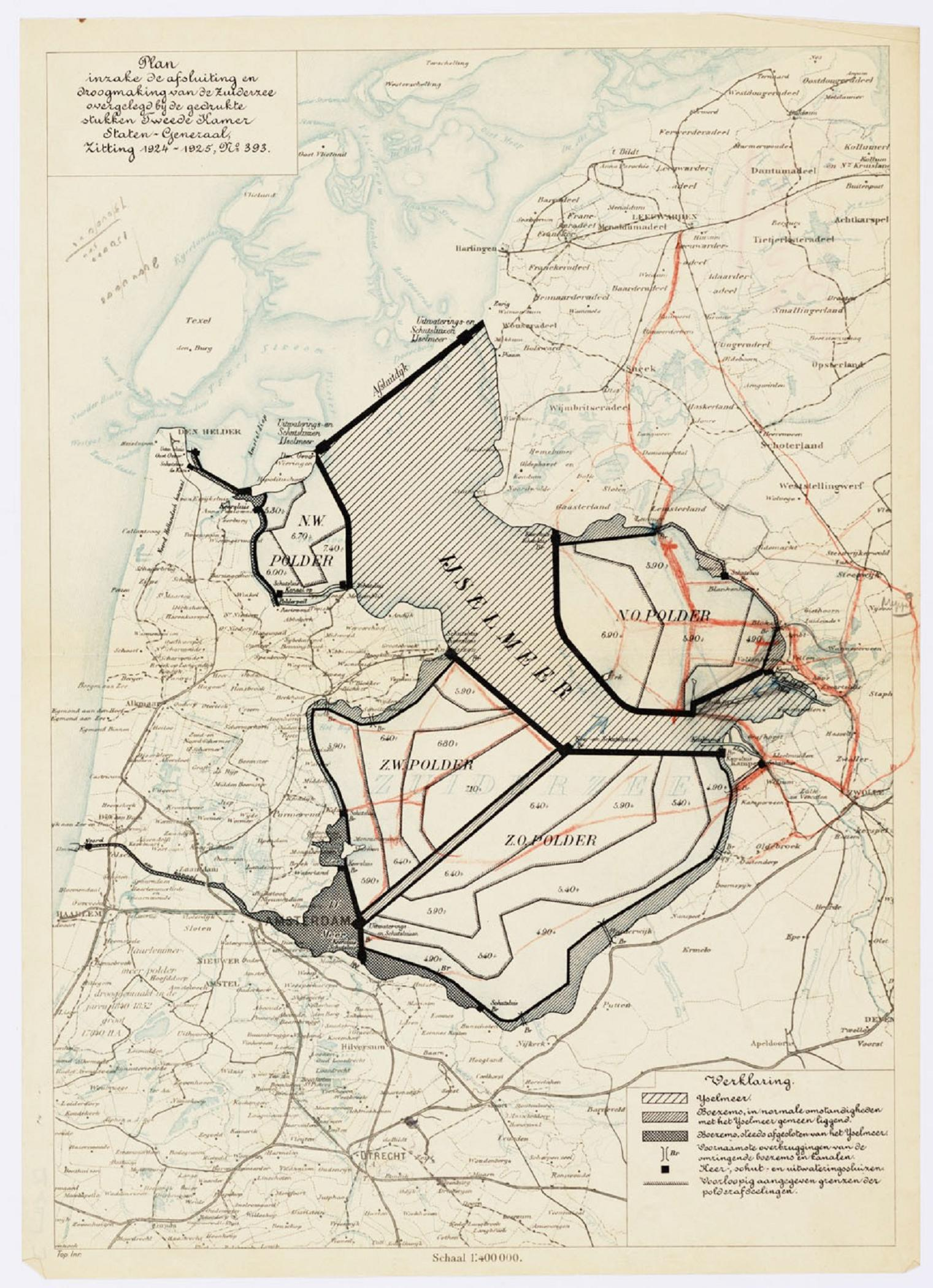
The Zuiderzee Works as planned in 1924 on Lely's map, the polder is called Zuidwestpolder.

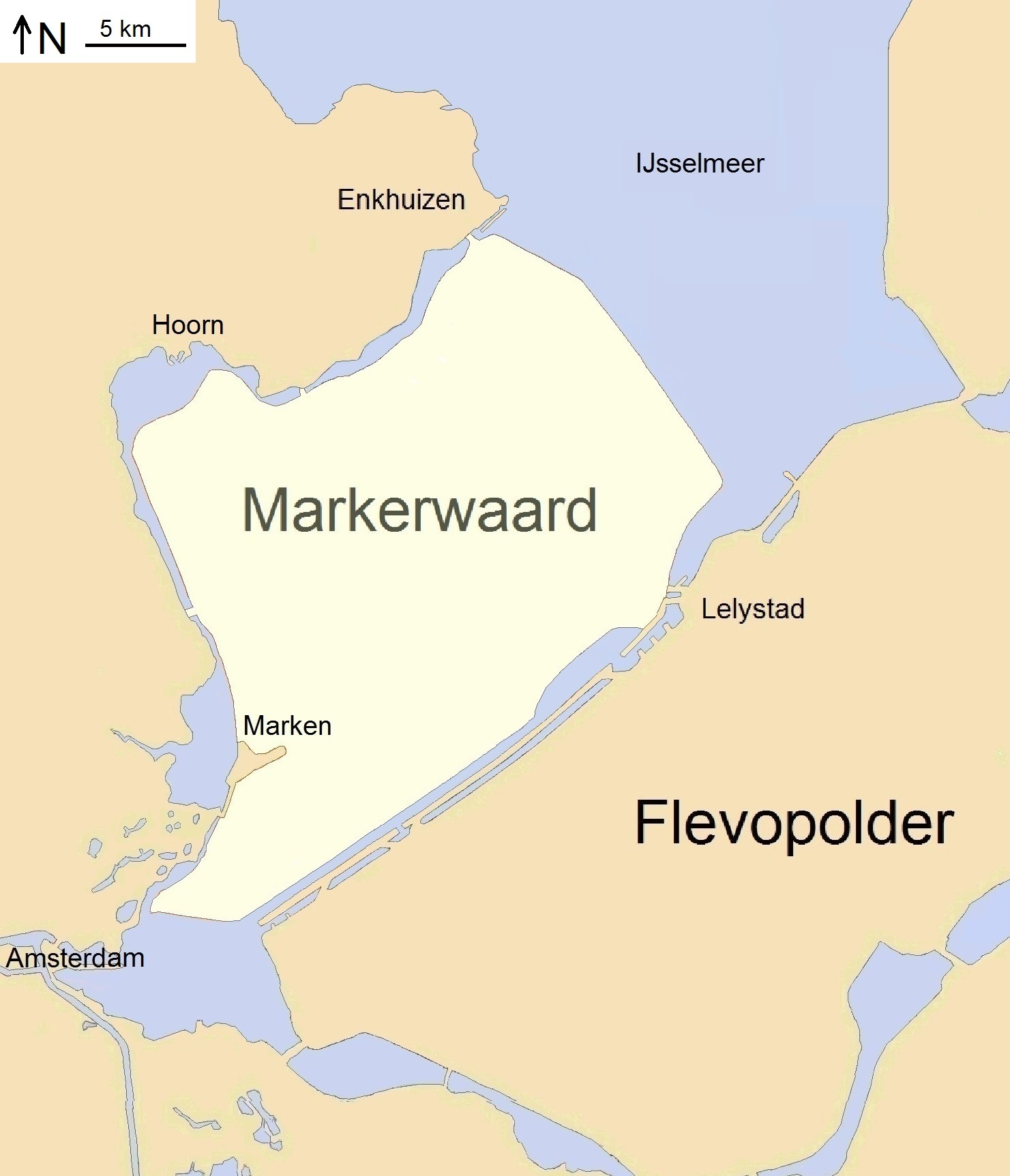
The Markerwaard as planned in 1965

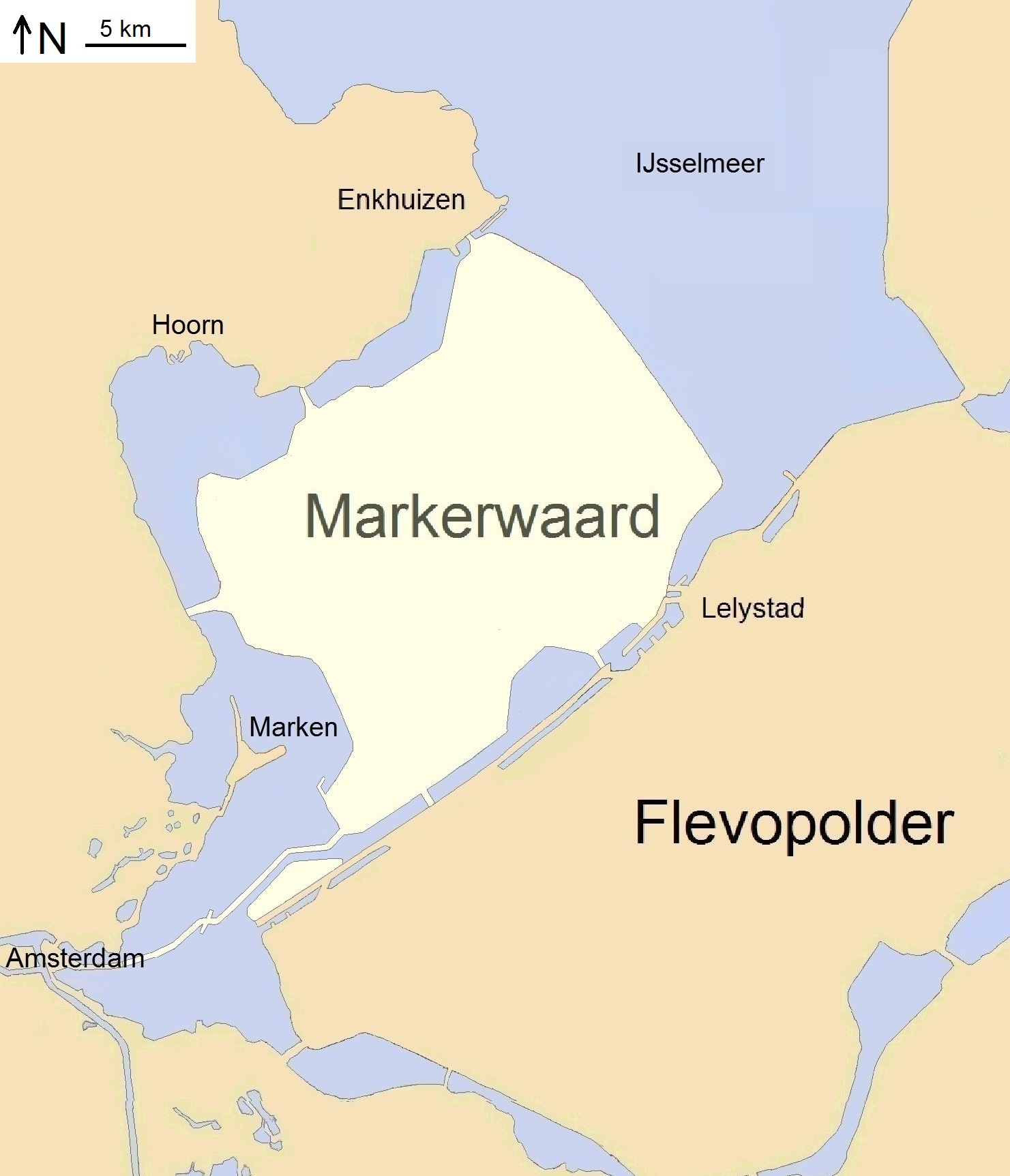
The Markerwaard as planned in 1981

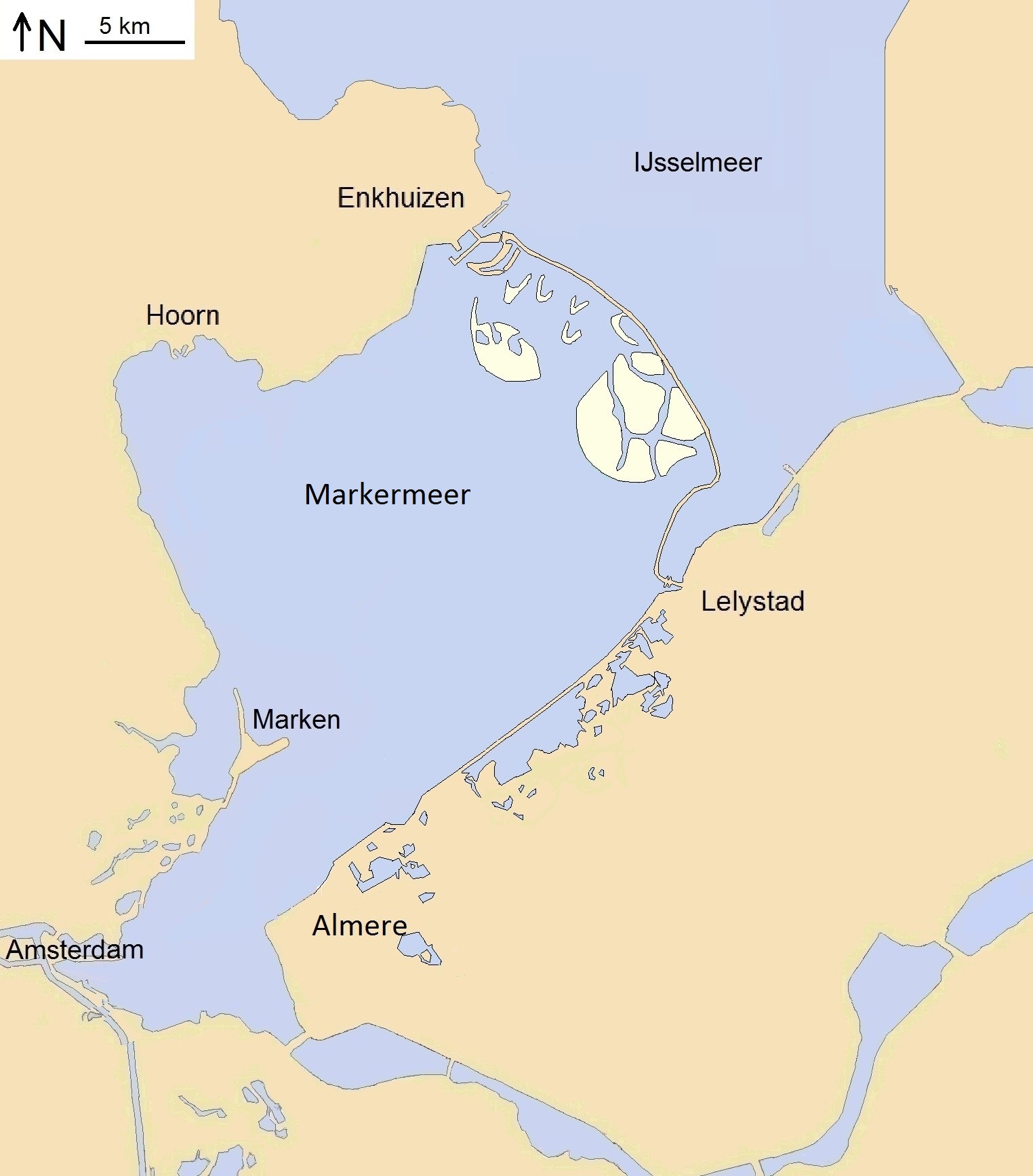
The project Marker Wadden, started in 2016, will be realized instead.
