= IJsselmeer =

Lake in the Netherlands

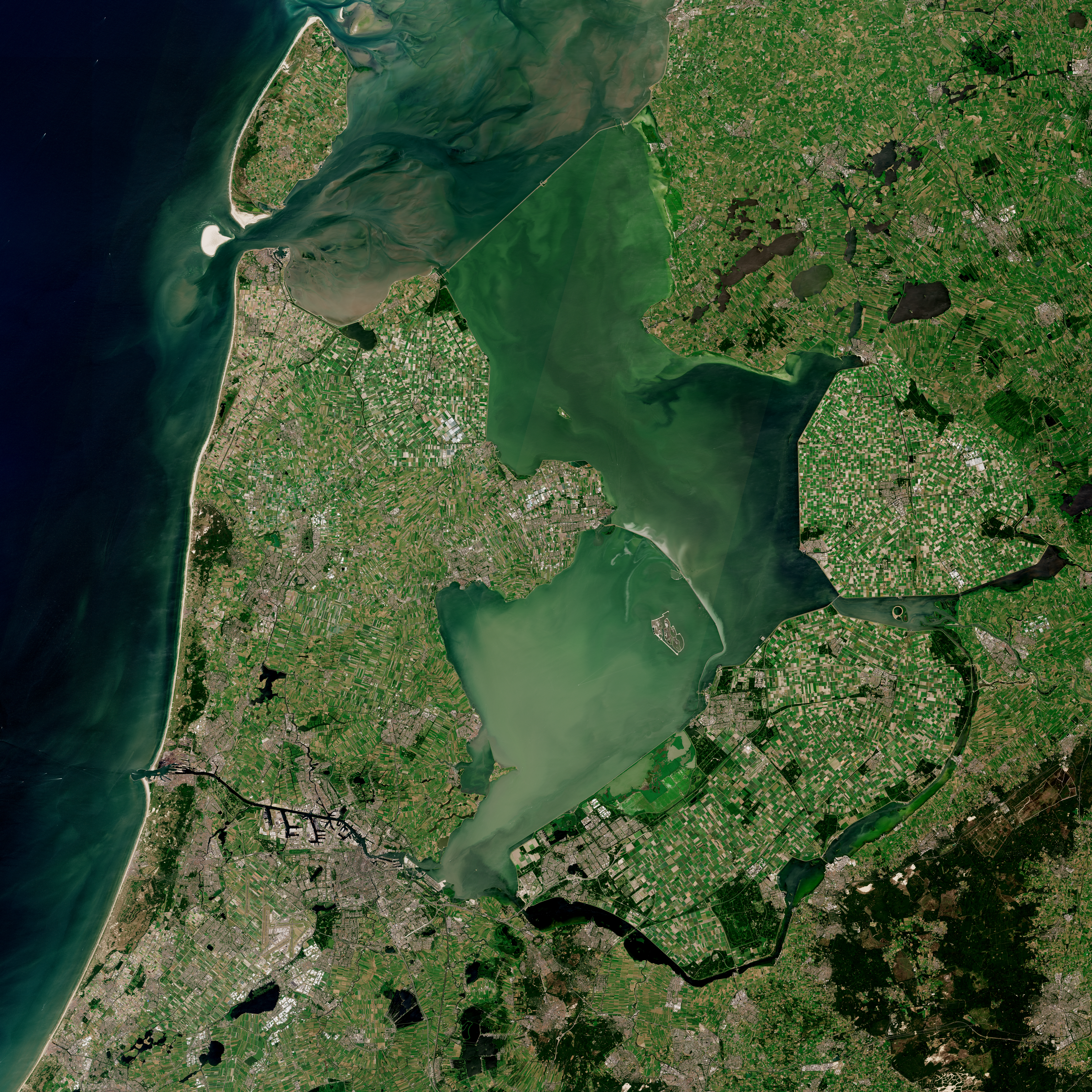
- Sentinel-2 photo of the Wadden Sea (top), IJsselmeer (middle), and Markermeer (bottom)

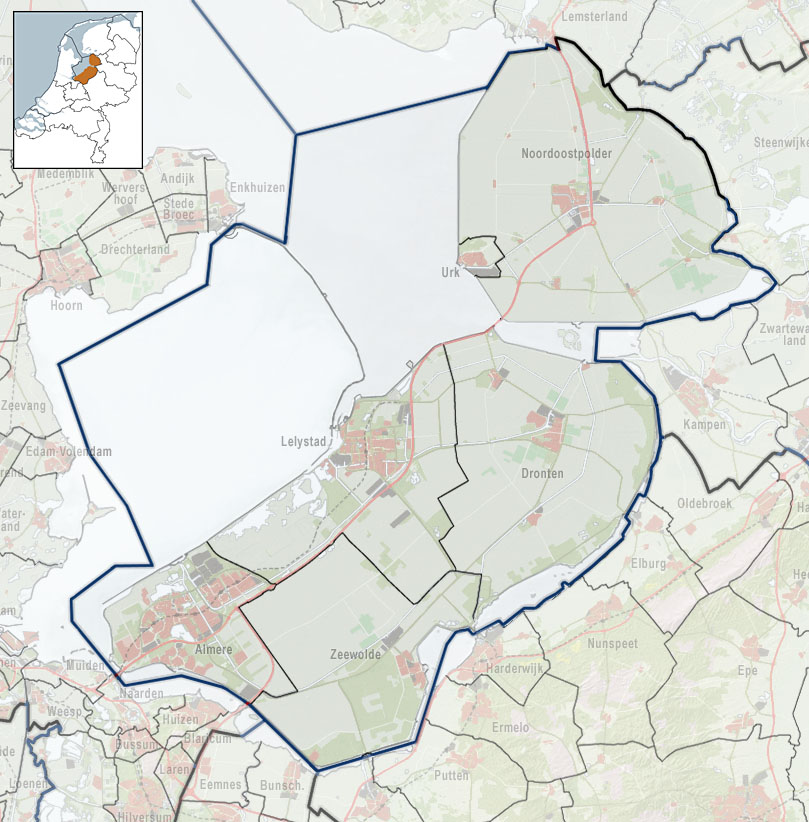
- Location within Flevoland

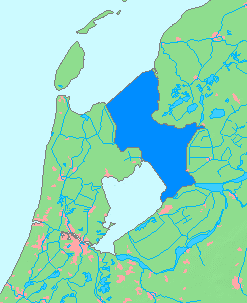
- IJsselmeer in dark blue
- Location: Netherlands
- Coordinates: 52°49′N 5°15′E
- Primary inflows: IJssel, Overijsselse Vecht
- Primary outflows: Wadden Sea (which empties into the North Sea)
- Surface area: 1,100 km^{2} (420 sq mi)
- Average depth: 4.5 m (15 ft)
- Max. depth: 9 m (30 ft)
- Surface elevation: −0.4 m (−1.3 ft) (winter) −0.2 m (−0.66 ft) (summer)

Ramsar Wetland
- Designated: 29 August 2000
- Reference no.: 1246

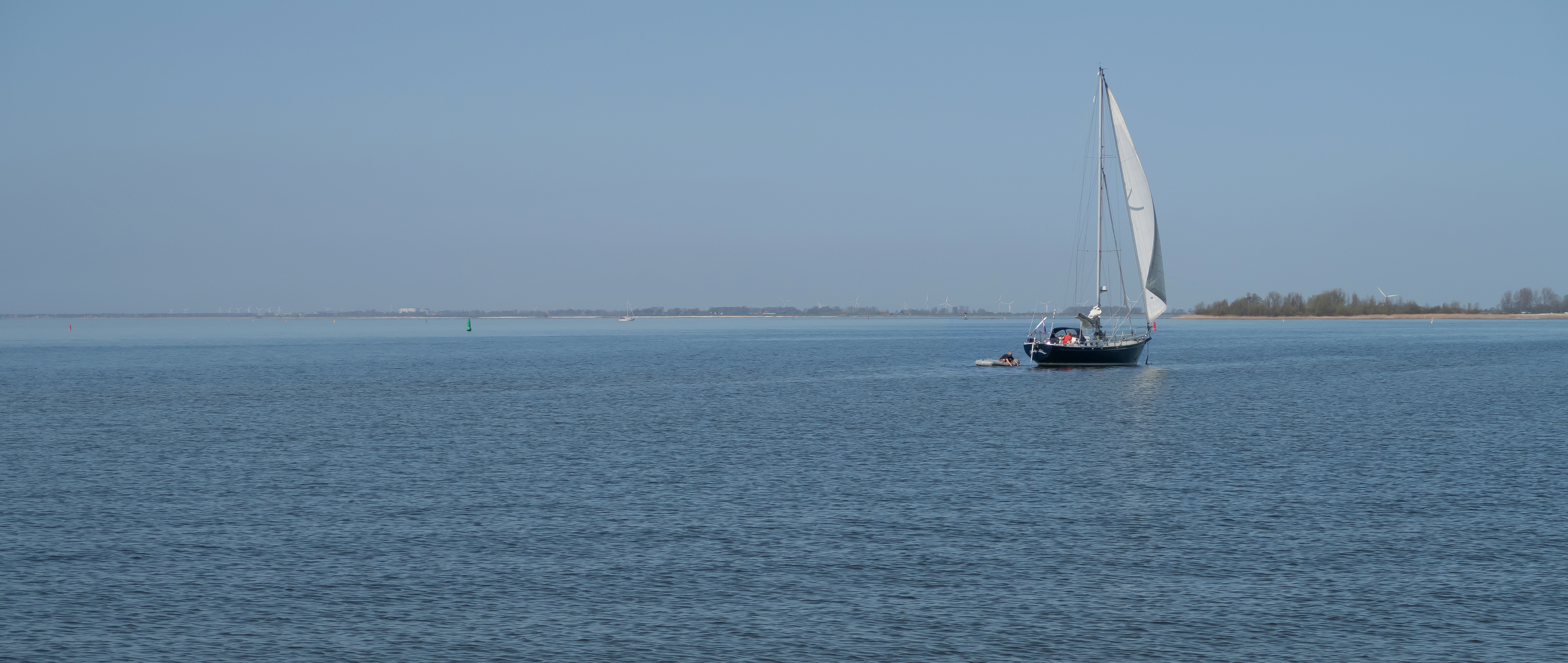
Hindeloopen, view of the IJsselmeer

The IJsselmeer (Note: In Dutch, both letters in the ⟨IJ⟩ digraph are capitalized together.) (Dutch: [ˌɛisəlˈmeːr]; West Frisian: Iselmar, Dutch Low Saxon: Iesselmeer), also known as Lake IJssel in English, is a closed-off freshwater lake in the central Netherlands bordering the provinces of Flevoland, North Holland and Friesland. It covers an area of 1,100 km^{2} (420 sq mi) with an average depth of 4.5 m (15 ft). The river IJssel, after which the lake was named, flows into the IJsselmeer.

== History ==
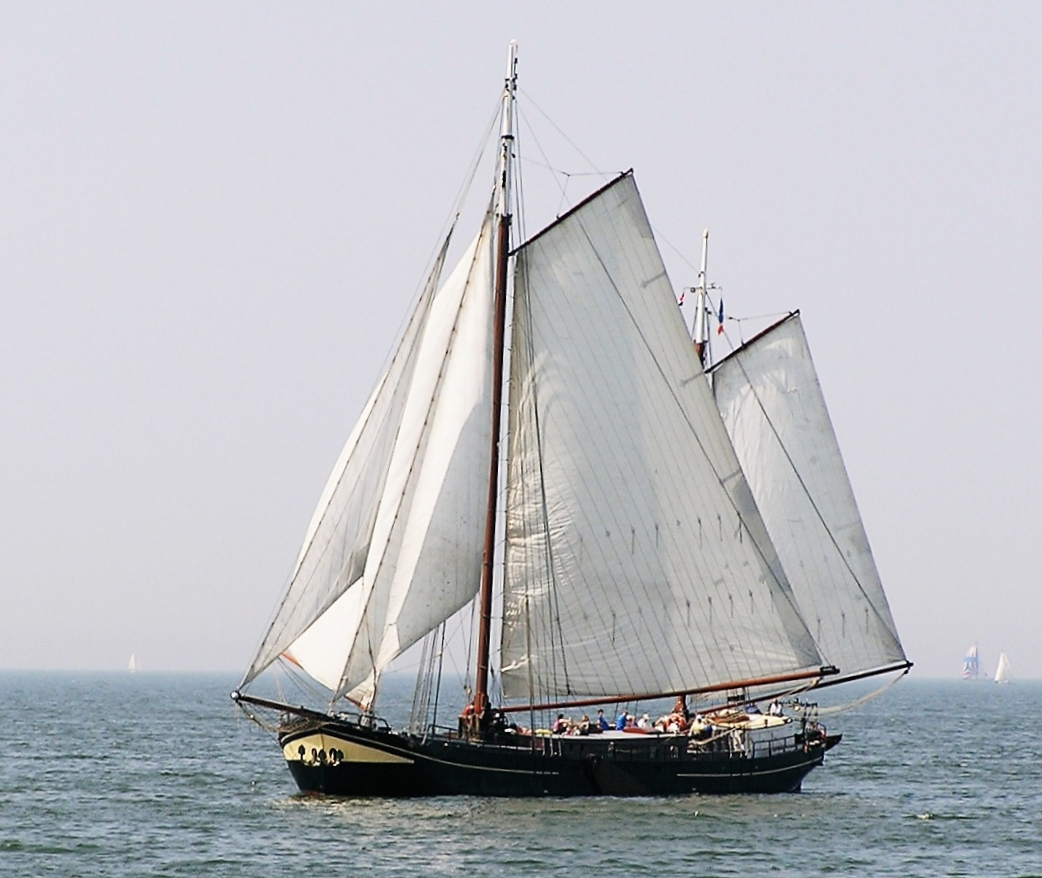
Traditional boat on the IJsselmeer

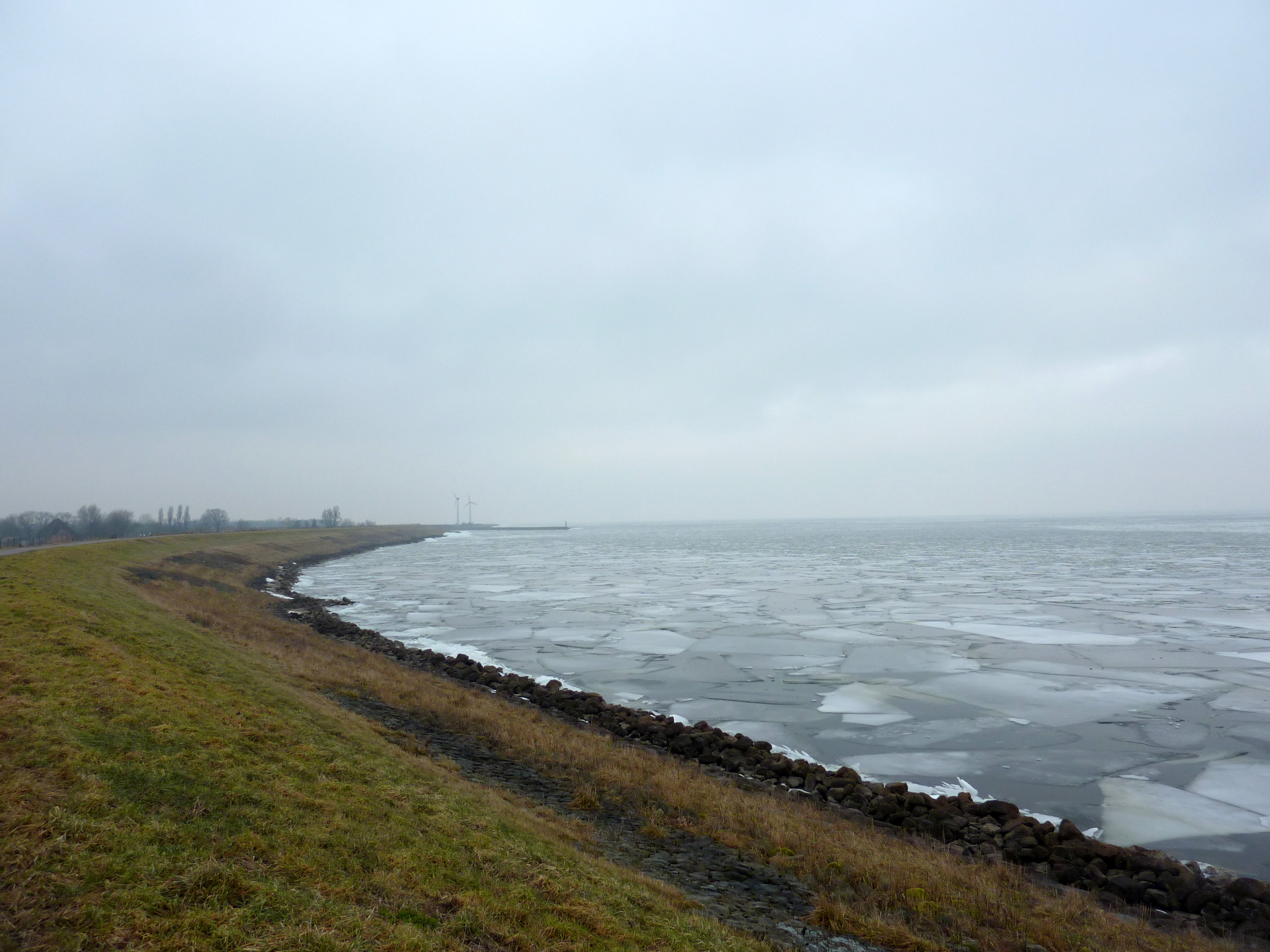
Frozen IJsselmeer, near lighthouse De Ven

Two thousand years ago Pomponius Mela, a Roman geographer, mentioned a complex of lakes at the current location of the IJsselmeer. He called it Lacus Flevo. Over the centuries, the lake banks crumbled away due to flooding and wave action, and the lake, now called the Almere, grew considerably. During the 12th and 13th centuries, storm surges and rising sea levels flooded large areas of land between the lake and the North Sea, turning the lake into a bay of the North Sea, called the Zuiderzee. The Zuiderzee continued to be a threat to the Dutch, especially when northwesterly storms funnel North Sea waters towards the English Channel, creating very high tides along the Dutch coast. During the 17th century, Zuiderzee dykes collapsed several times, and plans were drawn up to eliminate the threat by draining the bay. Later drainage plans focused on creating fertile farmland, but they never progressed beyond the planning stage. It was only after the flood of 1916 that the legislature approved the Zuiderzee Works, a major hydraulic engineering project that involved building dykes, draining parts of the Zuiderzee, and constructing the Afsluitdijk to keep tides and high water out.

Construction began in 1927, and in 1932 the Zuiderzee was closed off by the Afsluitdijk, a 32-kilometre (20 mi) dyke connecting Friesland and North Holland on either side of the Zuiderzee. The Zuiderzee was no longer a sea inlet and was renamed IJsselmeer (Lake IJssel) after the IJssel river that flows into it, which is also the namesake of the province of Overijssel. The continuing flow of fresh river water soon flushed out the salt water. Part of the IJsselmeer was later closed off to form the Markermeer.

From 1929 till 1967, over half the IJsselmeer was drained, creating 1,979 km^{2} (764 sq mi) of polders: Wieringermeerpolder, Noordoostpolder, East and South Flevoland.

In 1975, a dyke was built between Enkhuizen and Lelystad as the northern boundary of the Markerwaard, a planned but never realized polder in the IJsselmeer. This dyke, the Houtribdijk or Markerwaarddijk, split the IJsselmeer into two parts. The former southern part of the IJsselmeer is now the hydrologically separate Markermeer. The proposed "polderisation" of the Markerwaard was abandoned after many of the Dutch population did not want the loss of the traditional seaside (now lakeside) environment and vistas.

In 1986 three polders in the IJsselmeer constituted the new province of Flevoland, the twelfth province of the Netherlands.

The water of the IJsselmeer is now almost completely fresh, the saline having long since been purged. This altered environment has had an impact on the fish and plant ecosystems. The change has been beneficial for Dutch boats, many of which are steel, as the freshwater significantly reduces rusting of the hulls, and there is far less build-up of marine growth (such as algae and barnacles below the barges' waterlines). This has the knock-on benefit that barges and yachts in the IJsselmeer need far less antifouling, a coating which is inevitably somewhat toxic to wildlife.

== Current use ==
Due to considerable amounts of water from the Rhine flowing through its distributary IJssel into the IJsselmeer, the closed-off bay functions as a large freshwater reservoir, serving as a source for agriculture and drinking water. Outlet sluices in the Afsluitdijk regulate the water level of the IJsselmeer by putting the excess into the Wadden Sea through control locks. Excess water is also drained from the Markermeer in this same manner. However, this isn't always possible due to differing water levels, tides, and strong winds. Rising sea levels are also a growing problem. For this reason additional pumps are being added. Without many of these features, the national capability for flood risk management and water management would be hindered. The rising sea levels are of growing concern to the government, who are expanding pump installation at a growing rate.

The IJsselmeer is used for transport and fishing. It also offers a number of opportunities for recreational activity, both on the water and on its shores. Due to the shallowness of the IJsselmeer, the Markermeer, and the bordering lakes, their cities and fishing villages remained mostly unspoilt and have many historic buildings.

The IJsselmeer is home to the offshore segments of Windpark Noordoostpolder and to Windpark Fryslân.

In the summer the excess water is further diverted and used to provide more drinking water, irrigation and water recreation and to flush excess salt in the reclaimed lands. In the winter, this is reversed to accommodate additional rainwater.

== Geography ==
The IJsselmeer is primarily fed by the River IJssel (70%); this amount can vary by snowfall and rainwater. The rest comes from local rainwater and water from other sources such as streams and pumping stations.

== See also ==
- Almere (lake)
- IJsseloog, an artificial island in the Ketelmeer, was built as a repository for contaminated silt.
- Ijssel a river flowing from the Rhine to Ijsselmeer.
- Ketelmeer, a small bay between the IJsselmeer and the mouth of the river IJssel.
- Lake Flevo
- Markermeer
- Zuiderzee
