= Markermeer =

Lake in the central Netherlands

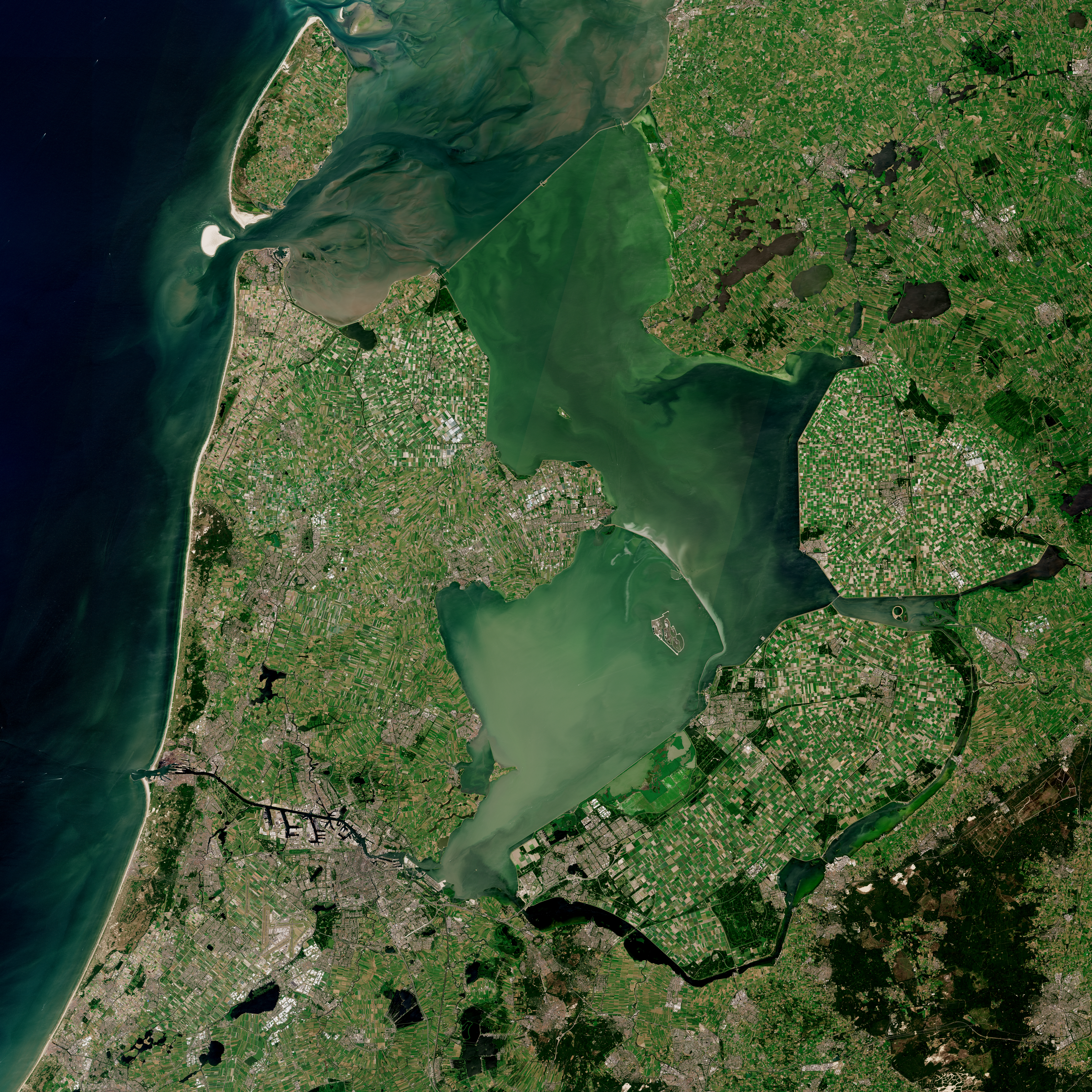
- Sentinel-2 photo
- Interactive map of Markermeer
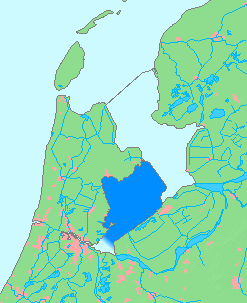
- Markermeer in dark blue
- Location: Netherlands
- Coordinates: 52°34′N 5°13′E
- Surface area: 700 km^{2} (270 sq mi)
- Max. depth: 5 m (16 ft)

Ramsar Wetland
- Official name: Markermeer & IJmeer
- Designated: 29 August 2000
- Reference no.: 1245

The Markermeer (Dutch pronunciation: [ˌmɑrkərˈmeːr]) is a 700 km^{2} (270 sq mi) lake in the central Netherlands in between North Holland, Flevoland, and its smaller and larger neighbors, the IJmeer and IJsselmeer. A shallow lake at 3 to 5 m in depth, matching the reclaimed land to its west, north-west and east it is named after the small former island, now peninsula, of Marken on its west shore.

The Markermeer was not originally intended to remain a lake. It was formerly part of the Zuiderzee, a saltwater inlet of the North Sea, that was dammed off by the Afsluitdijk (Closure Dike) in 1932, turning the Zuiderzee into the freshwater IJsselmeer. The following years saw the reclamation of extensive tracts of land as large polders in an enormous project known as the Zuiderzee Works. One of these, the Markerwaard, was to occupy the area of the current Markermeer. Part of the construction of this polder was building the Houtribdijk, also called Markerwaarddijk, finished in 1976, which hydrologically splits the IJsselmeer in two, the southern section being the Markermeer.

Because of changing priorities and doubts about its financial feasibility, the Markerwaard was indefinitely postponed in the 1980s and the Markermeer has since begun to become an ecological and recreational asset on its own.

The Markermeer is used as a freshwater reservoir and a buffer against floodwaters and droughts. In 2003 the Netherlands was hit by drought, and several minor dikes were endangered. Water from the Markermeer was used to keep the area surrounding Amsterdam wet, thereby keeping the dikes safe.

A recent project, the Marker Wadden aims to create some islands in the north of the lake, with a view to establish breeding grounds for seabirds. The islands will be a wetland, comparable with the Wadden Sea, but without appreciable tides because the Markermeer is not connected with the sea. This new nature reserve will be made accessible to tourists.

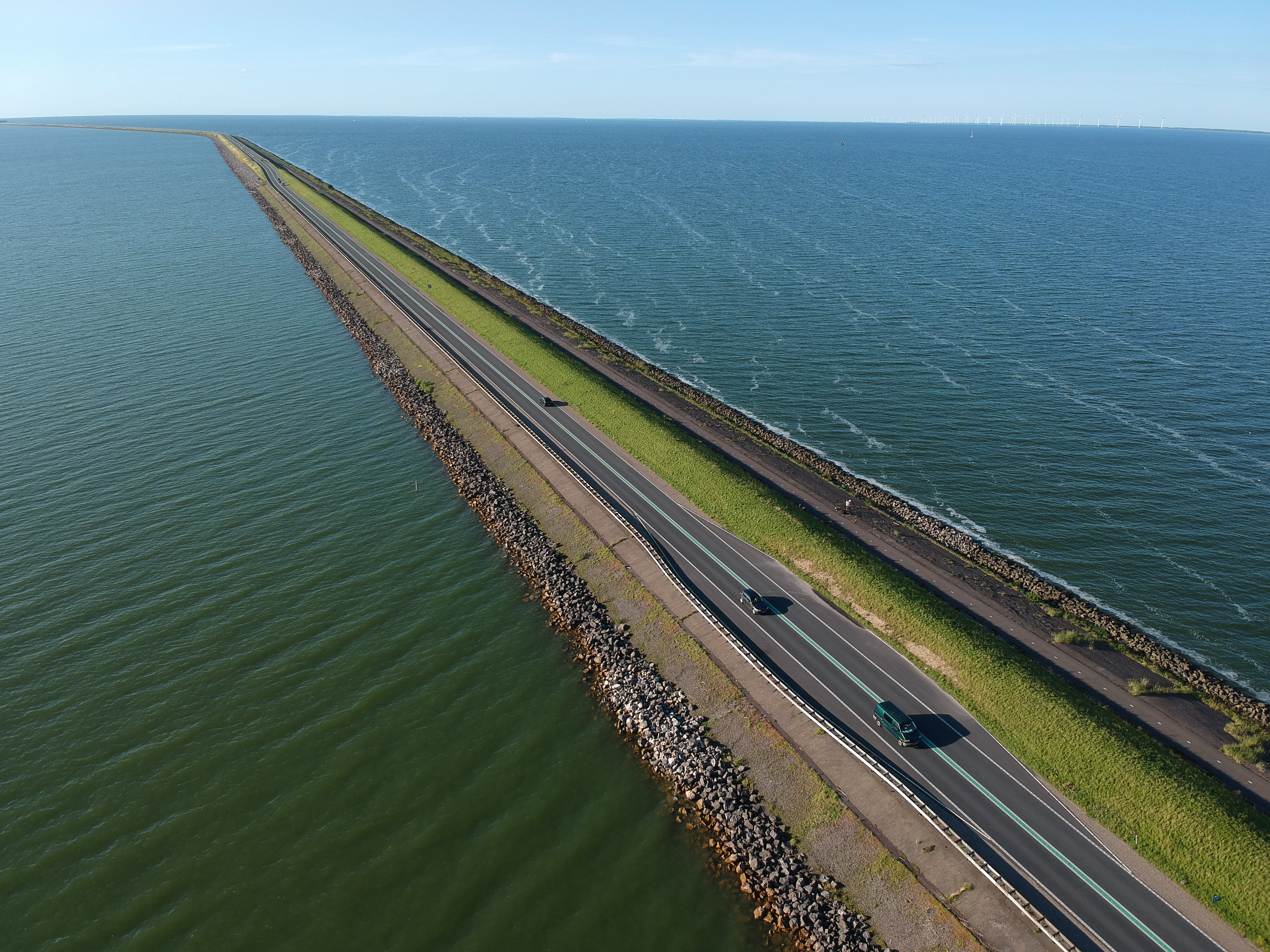
Houtribdijk - a dam between IJsselmeer and Markermeer

== See also ==
- Zuiderzeemuseum
- IJsselmeer
