= Maatschappij tot Uitvoering van Zuiderzeewerken =

Construction organisation in the Netherlands

N.V. Maatschappij tot Uitvoering van Zuiderzeewerken
- Company type: Naamloze vennootschap
- Industry: Civil engineering
- Founded: 1926; 100 years ago
- Founder: M.J. van Hattum's Havenwerken; Hollandsche Aannemingsmaatschappij; A. Bos; L. Volker
- Headquarters: Den Oever, Netherlands
- Key people: Jean Henri Telders (Chairman), Nicolaas de Ronde Bresser (Secretary), Johannes Aleidis Ringers
- Products: Dredging, land reclamation

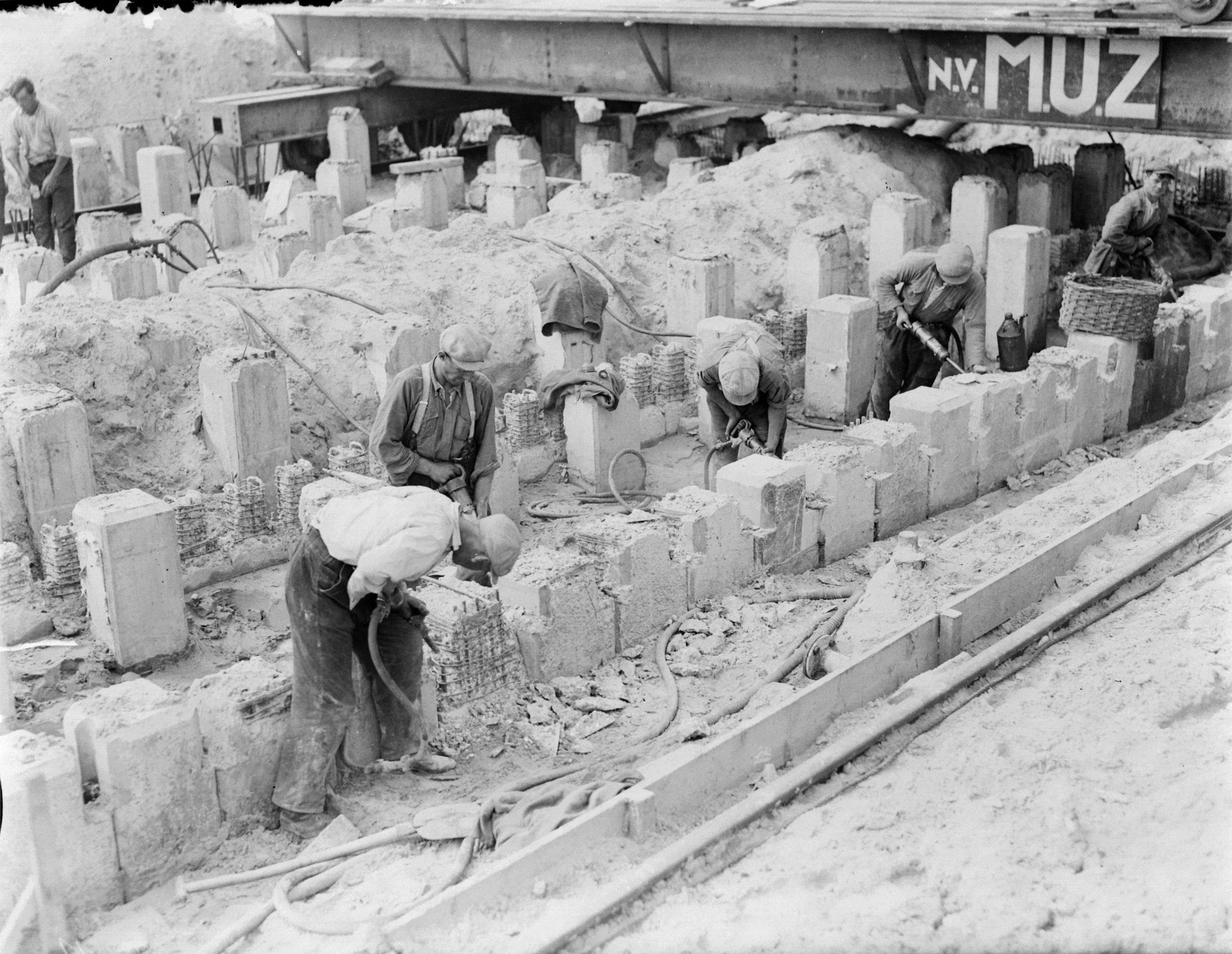
Construction of foundations for the Stevinsluizen sluice complex of the Afsluitdijk by MUZ (1930)

The Maatschappij tot Uitvoering van Zuiderzeewerken (MUZ) (English: Society for the Execution of the Zuiderzee Works) was a consortium of dredging contractors in the Netherlands, formed in August 1926 for the specific purpose of executing the Zuiderzee Works. The Zuiderzee Works comprised a number of significant hydraulic engineering projects designed to dam the Zuiderzee, a large shallow inlet of the North Sea, to prevent flooding and reclaim land for agricultural and residential use.

The founding companies of the consortium included M.J. van Hattum's Havenwerken from Beverwijk, Hollandsche Aannemingsmaatschappij from The Hague, A. Bos from Dordrecht, and L. Volker.

MUZ was headquartered in Den Oever and was responsible for the construction of several key projects of the Zuiderzee Works, including the Afsluitdijk, a major dam and causeway completed in 1932 that converted the Zuiderzee into the freshwater IJsselmeer. The work carried out by the MUZ consortium significantly influenced water management and contracting practices in the Netherlands, but the lack of competition for major infrastructure projects arising from the creation of such a large entity attracted criticism.

== Formation ==
The consortium was led by J.A. Ringers, an engineer previously employed by Rijkswaterstaat whose hydraulic engineering experience included overseeing the construction of the Noordersluis at IJmuiden. Whilst Ringers' involvement provided significant technical expertise and governmental trust, there remained some concerns that awarding a series of large infrastructure projects to a single joint venture entity created an effective monopoly. These concerns were partially assuaged by the formation of a rival consortium in 1927, known as Maatschappij tot Aanneming van Zuiderzeewerken (MAZ) (English: Society for Contracting Zuiderzee Works).

== Projects and developments ==
The first project undertaken by the MUZ was the construction of the Pilot Polder at Andijk (Dutch: Proefpolder Andijk). On 17 September 1927, a competitor organisation known as the Society for Contracting Zuiderzee Works (Dutch: Maatschappij tot Aanneming van Zuiderzeewerken, MAZ) was founded. The MAZ was established by N.V. Maatschappij tot Aanneming van Werken, owned by A.L.J. (Leendert) Volker of Bussum, and Johannes Kraaijeveld of Sliedrecht, with the company later becoming Boskalis. This consortium was based in Anna Paulowna, with its first project being the construction of a dike around the Boezemmeer south of Wieringen.

Over time, additional contractors joined the MAZ joint venture, including A. Prins and K.L. Kalis. Several companies from outside the two joint venture groups, such as Breejenbout and Zanen Verstoep, participated in the Zuiderzee Works through special arrangements.

During the Great Depression, economic challenges necessitated increased collaboration within the Netherlands dredging industry. This led to the establishment of an association of Dutch dredging contractors known as the Vereniging “centraal baggerbedrijf” which ultimately facilitated the merger of the MUZ and MAZ organisations. Historical records indicate significant cultural differences between these two organisations, with the MUZ often described as more formal. This perception is noted in an appendix to the 2001 reissue of the book Het verjaagde water, which includes a historical account of events undertaken by researchers from Delft University of Technology.

== See also ==
- Flood control in the Netherlands
- Zuiderzee Works
- Rijkswaterstaat
