= Johan Ringers =

Dutch hydraulic engineer and politician

dr. ir. Johannes Aleidis Ringers CBE Hon. FIMechE
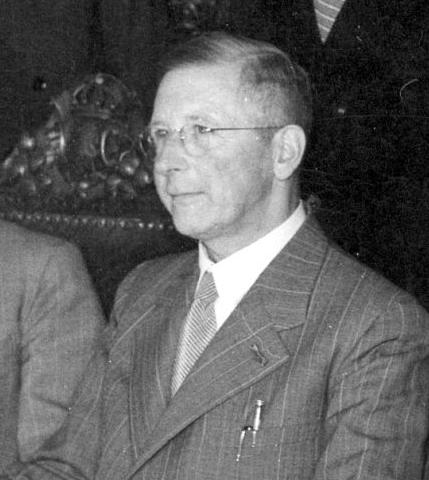
- Johannes Aleidis Ringers in 1946
- Born: 2 January 1885; Alkmaar, the Netherlands
- Died: 6 May 1965 (aged 80); The Hague
- Education: Delft University of Technology
- Known for: Zuiderzee Works
- Awards: Commander of the British Empire (CBE); Honorary Fellow of the Institution of Mechanical Engineers
- Scientific career
- Fields: Civil engineering Hydraulic engineering
- Workplaces: Rijkswaterstaat; Waterloopkundig Laboratorium; Maatschappij tot Uitvoering van Zuiderzeewerken; Nederlandsch-Indische Spoorweg Maatschappij

Johannes Aleidis (Johan) Ringers CBE (Alkmaar, 2 January 1885 – The Hague, 6 May 1965) was a Dutch hydraulic engineer and politician. He served as the director-general of Rijkswaterstaat and later as the director of Dutch East Indies Railways. During World War II, Ringers was appointed as the government commissioner for reconstruction, but was later interned by German forces.

After World War II, he became the Minister of Public Works and Reconstruction in the Schermerhorn and Beel I cabinets. Finding himself in disagreement with the Dutch East Indies policy of the Netherlands government, he resigned in 1946. He was the brother of Hendrik Ringers who founded the Ringers chocolate company, and served on the supervisory board of that company.

== Education and Early Career ==
After completing his education at the Hogere Burgerschool in Alkmaar, Ringers studied at the Technical University of Delft, where he obtained his diploma in Civil Engineering in 1906. He initially worked for Rijkswaterstaat in the district of Goes and contributed to the construction of locks at Hansweert in the Kanaal door Zuid-Beveland. In 1911, he published an article in the journal De Ingenieur about lock gates in Germany and Belgium. In 1916, he moved to Java and took up the role of chief engineer for the Dutch East Indies Railway Company. He returned to Rijkswaterstaat in 1920 and worked on canalisation in West Friesland, publishing a technical report on the work in 1922.

== Noordersluis van IJmuiden ==
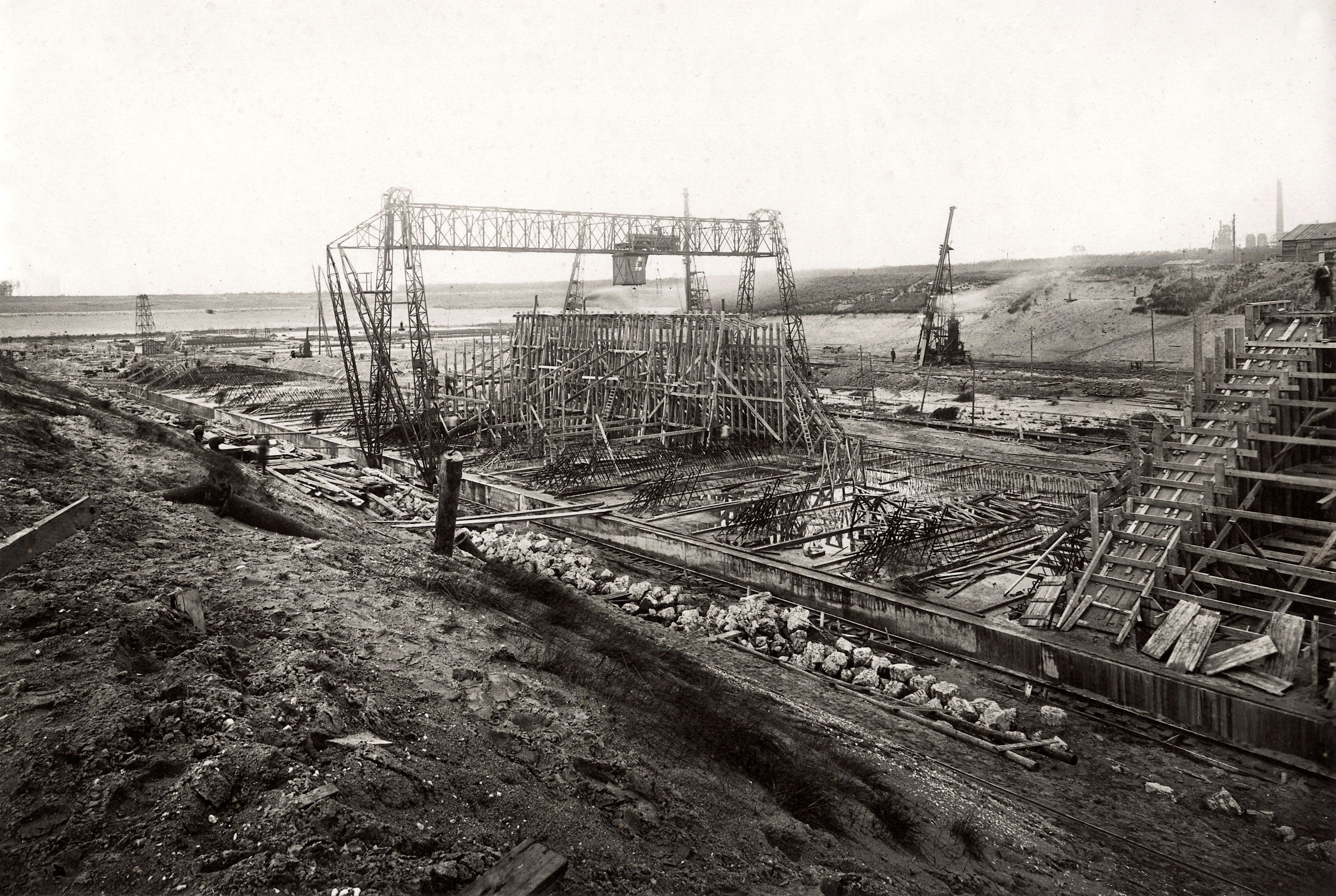
The lock at IJmuiden under construction

Ringers became the project leader for the construction of the Noordersluis van IJmuiden. Together with Paul Josephus Jitta, he designed and led the construction of the lock, publishing several works on the subject. In recognition of his work on the Noordersluis, he was awarded the Conrad Medal by the Dutch Royal Institute of Engineers in 1926. After completing the IJmuiden project, Ringers became involved with the Zuiderzee Works as chief director of the Maatschappij tot Uitvoering van Zuiderzeewerken on 1 January 1927.

== Director-General of Rijkswaterstaat ==
In 1930, Ringers was appointed Director-General of Rijkswaterstaat. In 1935, he also became a member of the board of directors of the Netherlands-Indian Railway Company, based in The Hague. He held various honorary positions, including vice-chairman of the Waterloopkundig Laboratorium, chairman of the Association of Delft Engineers, vice-chairman of the Royal Institute of Engineers (of which he became an honorary member in 1955), member of the National Commission for Drinking Water Supply, chairman of the Dutch Delegation to the Permanent International Association of Navigation Congresses (PIANC), and a member of the standing committee for Port Policy of the Economic Council. In September 1930, he received an honorary doctorate from Delft University of Technology, followed in June 1932 by an honorary doctorate from the Danzig University of Technology, allowing him to use the title dr. ir.

== Second World War ==
The Second World War marked a significant turning point in Ringers' career. Before the outbreak of war, the Dutch Minister of Defence had ordered measures to prevent enemy action from damaging hydraulic engineering structures. The precautions taken at that time, based on Ringers’ advice, proved effective. By 30 May 1940, all areas of the Netherlands which had been flooded during the German invasion were dry and rehabilitated. On 21 May 1940, General Winkelman appointed him Government Commissioner for Reconstruction, a position that was renamed General Authorised Representative for Reconstruction and for the Construction Industry in the Occupied Dutch Territory on 23 December 1940.

On Ringers' advice, decisions were made within a few days to bring all areas of land where buildings in Rotterdam had been destroyed by German bombing into state ownership, thereby allowing immediate disposal of rubble and commencement of reconstruction. It was also decided to move the location of major Dutch sea defences. To this end, he commissioned Johan van Veen to study the required safety level of the country’s dikes. In recognition of his efforts, Rotterdam honoured him in 1963 as the "father of reconstruction" with a plaque in the office of municipal public works, the Stadstimmerhuis.

At the beginning of the occupation of the Netherlands, Ringers established contact with the banker E.E. Menten, who was involved in espionage activities. During an inspection trip as the General Representative for Reconstruction and the Construction Industry, Ringers was arrested by the Sicherheitsdienst on 1 April 1943. His arrest was part of mass detentions ordered by J. Schreieder, head of Referat IV E of the Sicherheitspolizei, targeting the Vorrink Group and the National Committee in the context of the Englandspiel, a German counterintelligence operation.

Ringers spent about seven and a half months in prison in Scheveningen, where he continued some of his work, including designing a plan for heating the city of Rotterdam using primitive methods. He was then transferred to the Herzogenbusch concentration camp in Vught for four months, spent three weeks as a hostage in St. Michielsgestel, and was finally imprisoned in the Sachsenhausen concentration camp in Germany until May 1945.

== After the war ==
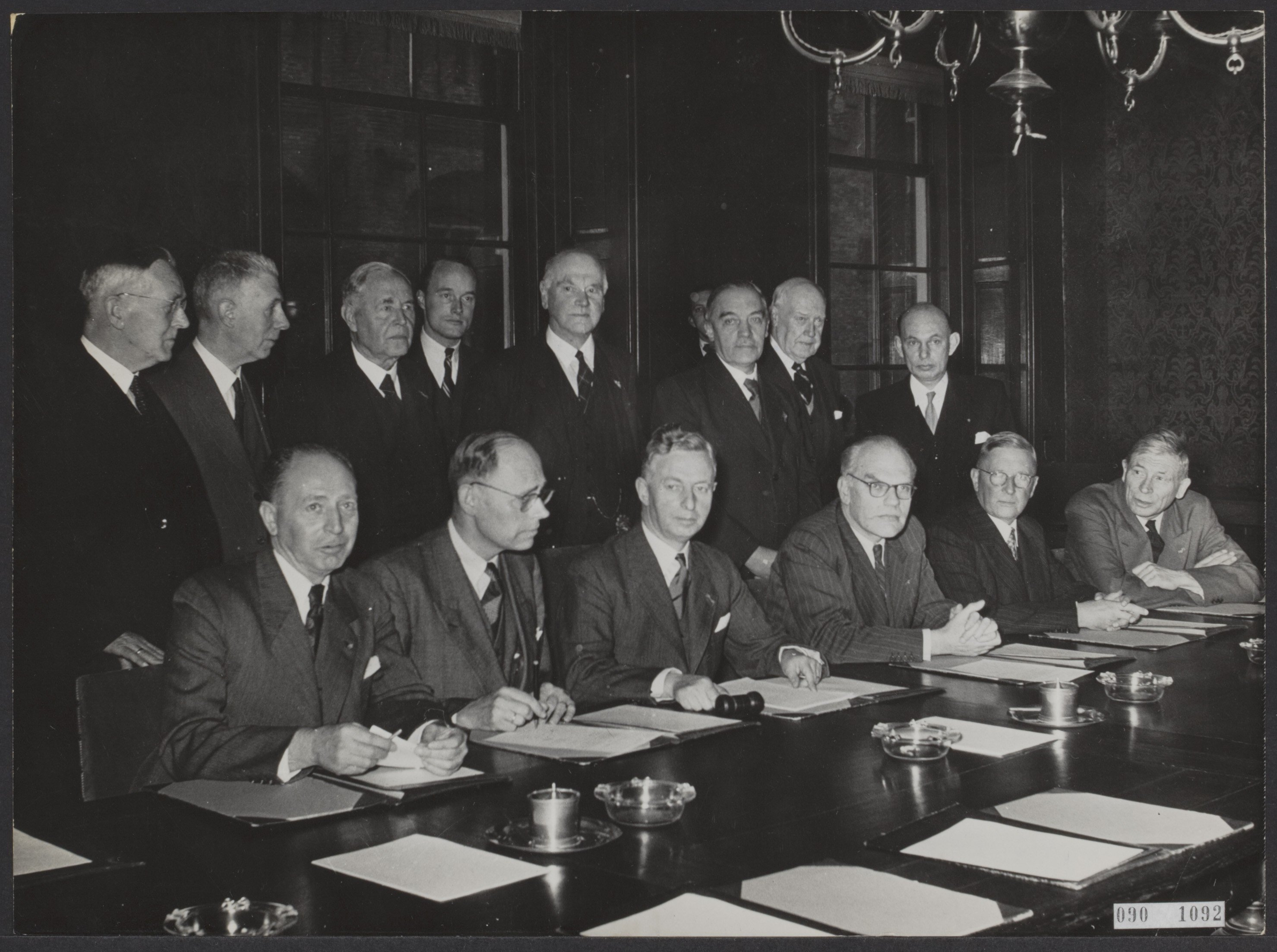
Installation of the Deltacommission

Immediately after the liberation, Ringers was included in the Schermerhorn-Drees cabinet as a non-partisan Minister of Public Works (and from 16 August 1945 also as Minister of Reconstruction). This cabinet transitioned into the First Beel cabinet on 3 July 1946. Ringers was instrumental in fostering the necessary team spirit to ensure the difficult work of reconstruction proceeded relatively smoothly. As minister, he appointed Cees van der Leeuw as his representative for the reconstruction of Rotterdam, and together they significantly influenced the Basic Plan for the Reconstruction of Rotterdam.

For his exceptional contributions to the reconstruction, Ringers was awarded the Van Oldenbarnevelt Medal in 1963, the highest municipal distinction of the city of Rotterdam. However, he disagreed with the policy of the Netherlands towards Indonesia, specifically the Linggadjati Agreement, leading him to tender his resignation on 30 October 1946, which was accepted on 15 November 1946.

Ringers was invited to give a special address chaired by Sir Peirson Frank at the Institution of Civil Engineers in London on 23 November 1945, during which he detailed his involvement in hydraulic engineering in the Netherlands, along with the co-operation with British engineers following the inundation of Walcheren.

In his work as a consulting engineer, he was asked by the British Government to provide advice for major rehabilitation works necessitated by extensive flooding in the spring of 1947, when the River Trent and the River Welland burst their banks. As a result of his efforts, Ringers was made a Commander of the Most Honourable Order of the British Empire the same year. He became involved with the Institution of Mechanical Engineers, assisting in the organisation of their summer meeting in the Netherlands in 1953, and was elected an Honorary Member of the Institution in 1954.

Following the flood disaster in the Netherlands in 1953, he served as a member of the Delta Commission which designed the Delta Plan. In 1957, he advised the Institution of Civil Engineers' Maritime and Waterways Engineer Division on aspects of dredging. He also worked as an advisor for Bataafse Petroleum Maatschappij, which later became part of Shell plc. He made extensive trips to America and Asia in connection with this work.

== Bibliography ==
Publications by Ringers:

- Ringers, J.A. (1957). "Maritime Paper No. 36: Factors influencing the choice of the right dredger". Proceedings of the Institution of Civil Engineers. 6 (2): 151–177. doi:10.1680/iicep.1957.12356. ISSN 1753-7789.
- Ringers, J.A. (1953). Caland en de betekenis van zijn werk voor Rotterdam [Caland and the Significance of His Work for Rotterdam] (in Dutch). Roterodamum.
- Ringers, J.A. (1942). "100 jaar civiel-ingenieur" [100 Years of Civil Engineering]. De Ingenieur (in Dutch). special issue.
- Ringers, J.A.; Jitta, J.P. (1927). Rapporten en mededeelingen van den Rijkswaterstaat; no. 23: Proeven en beschouwingen, welke geleid hebben tot het vaststellen van het systeem van vulling en lediging van de kolk der nieuwe schutsluis te IJmuiden [Reports and Communications of the Rijkswaterstaat; no. 23: Tests and Observations Leading to the Establishment of the System for Filling and Emptying the Chamber of the New Lock at IJmuiden] (in Dutch). Rijkswaterstaat.
- Ringers, J.A. (17 October 1925). "De bouw van de nieuwe schutsluis te IJmuiden" [The Construction of the New Lock at IJmuiden]. De Ingenieur (in Dutch). 40 (42).
- Ringers, J.A. (1922). Rapporten en mededeelingen van den Rijkswaterstaat: no. 20: Verslag betreffende een studiereis naar Duitschland en Frankrijk, ondernomen in maart en april 1921, in verband met den bouw van een schutsluis te IJmuiden [Reports and Communications of the Rijkswaterstaat: no. 20: Report on a Study Trip to Germany and France, Undertaken in March and April 1921, in Connection with the Construction of a Lock at IJmuiden] (in Dutch). Rijkswaterstaat.
- Ringers, J.A. (1917). Rapporten en mededeelingen van den Rijkswaterstaat; no. 8: Beschrijving van den bouw van de derde schutsluis in het kanaal door Zuid-Beveland te Hansweert [Reports and Communications of the Rijkswaterstaat; no. 8: Description of the Construction of the Third Lock in the Canal through Zuid-Beveland at Hansweert] (in Dutch). Rijkswaterstaat.
- Ringers, J.A. (28 February 1914). "De bemaling van den fundeeringput van de in aanbouw zijnde Derde Schutsluis te Hansweert" [The Drainage of the Foundation Pit of the Third Lock under Construction at Hansweert]. De Ingenieur (in Dutch). 29 (9).
- Ringers, J.A. (13 May 1911). "Rol- en schuifdeuren in België en Duitsland" [Rolling and Sliding Doors in Belgium and Germany]. De Ingenieur (in Dutch). 26 (19).
