= De Kreupel =

Artificial island in the Netherlands

- Location in the Ijsselmeer

Geography
- Location: Enkhuizen, North Holland, Netherlands
- Coordinates: 52°47′55″N 5°13′41″E

De Kreupel is a 70-hectare uninhabited artificial island and natural reserve on the IJsselmeer, located 4.5 kilometers off the coast of Andijk and Medemblik in the municipality of Enkhuizen. It is managed by the Staatsbosbeheer. It is not open to the public, except for the marina.

== History ==
De Kreupel was constructed between 2002 and 2004 on an existing shallow area in the Ijsselmeer near Andijk. In the 15th century, this shallow area formed an island in the Zuiderzee. When the Amsterdam-Lemmer channel needed to be deepened, the resulting silt was used to create an area of sandbanks, providing waterfowl such as common terns, little terns, and gulls. It is now the largest breeding colony in Europe for common terns. During the summer months, the island is a resting place for thousands of black terns.

A total of three million cubic meters of sand was deposited on existing sandbanks, creating a bare area for birds to nest on. This area is kept clear of shrubs and trees by the Dutch Forestry Commission (the Staatsbosbeheer).

The marina was constructed in 2008. It consists of several jetties and a floating house for the harbormaster, equipped with a lookout.

== 2025 shipwreck ==
In November 2025, a man was shipwrecked on the island with his yacht. He had no VHF radio or working phone with him, and so he could not call for help. Due in part to the bad weather, the half-sunken yacht went unnoticed for days until he was rescued by the KNRM after two and a half days.
