= Elze van den Ban =

Dutch urban planner (1894–1973)

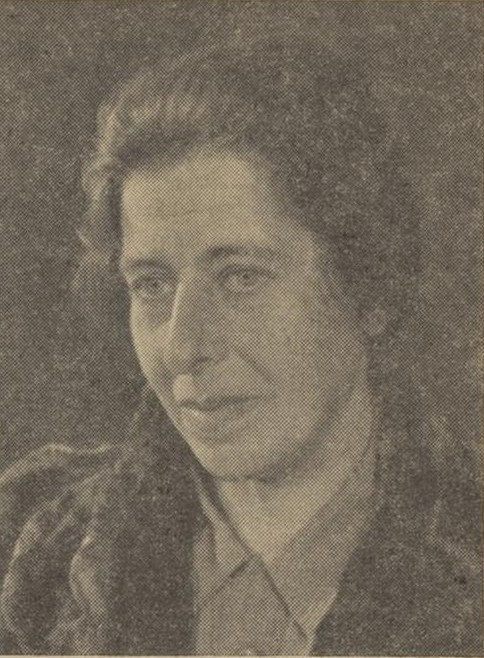
- Elze van den Ban (around 1950)
- Born: Elizabeth Frederika van den Ban; 18 October 1894; Haarlem
- Died: 25 December 1973 (aged 79)
- Occupations: civil engineer, urban planner

Elizabeth Frederika van den Ban, known as Elze, (18 October 1894 - 25 December 1973) was a Dutch urban planner and chief engineer of the Rijkswaterstaat (Department of Public Works) at Zuiderzee Works where she introduced curvatures rather than straight lines into the urban planning process of polders and dikes. Van den Ban was the first woman from the Netherlands to graduate as a civil engineer in Delft, where she worked as a civil engineer.

== Early life and education ==
Elizabeth Frederika van den Ban, known as Elze, was born in Haarlem on 18 October 1894 to Anna Kater and Jacob van den Ban. Her father was an architect who worked in and around in Haarlem and Amsterdam. She was one of three sisters, Anna Jacoba (Ans) Meerdink-van den Ban (b,1899) who became a pastor in Soest and Frederika Elisabeth Hugenholtz-van den Ban (b. 1896). Their mother - Anna Kater - died young in 1911. Age 16, van den Ban told her mother that she wanted to study at Delft University of Technology and she became the first woman from the Netherlands to graduate as a civil engineer there.

== Career ==
Van den Ban briefly taught mathematics at the Municipal hogere burgerschool (secondary school) in Haarlem in 1919. After graduating from university, she joined her father Jacob van den Ban at his architectural firm. She then held a position with Provincial Water Authority of North Holland as an urban planner for almost a quarter of a century. She was often referred to as E. F. van den Ban professionally. In 1949, Van den Ban was assigned to the Zuiderzee Works Department as an urban planner. Here, she revolutionised the development of planning by promoting the use of curvatures in the construction of streets and roads, rather than straight lines and was involved in the creation of the Zuid-Kennemerland National Park initially suggested by Jac. P. Thijsse.

She was on the board of Vereniging van vrouwen met hogere opleiding (VVAO) (Association for Women University Graduates) from 1931 to 1937 and was chairman when it was founded afd Haarlem in 1937. In 1946, she was one of only four women of forty architects or visual artists appointed by the Minister of Education, Arts and Sciences, on the recommendation of the Queen's Commissioner of Art, to sit on the Provincial Committees on War or Peace Memorials and was chosen as Secretary for Noord-Holland division. She also gave lectures on her work.

Elze van den Ban died in Middenlaan 78, Haarlem on 25 December 1973.

== Publications ==
Hoorn, Westfriesland en de Markerwaard Elze F. van der Ban, 1957.

De provinciale indeling van de IJsselmeerpolders by A. Blaauboer, Elze F. van den Ban and A.J. Venstra, 1960

== Recognition ==
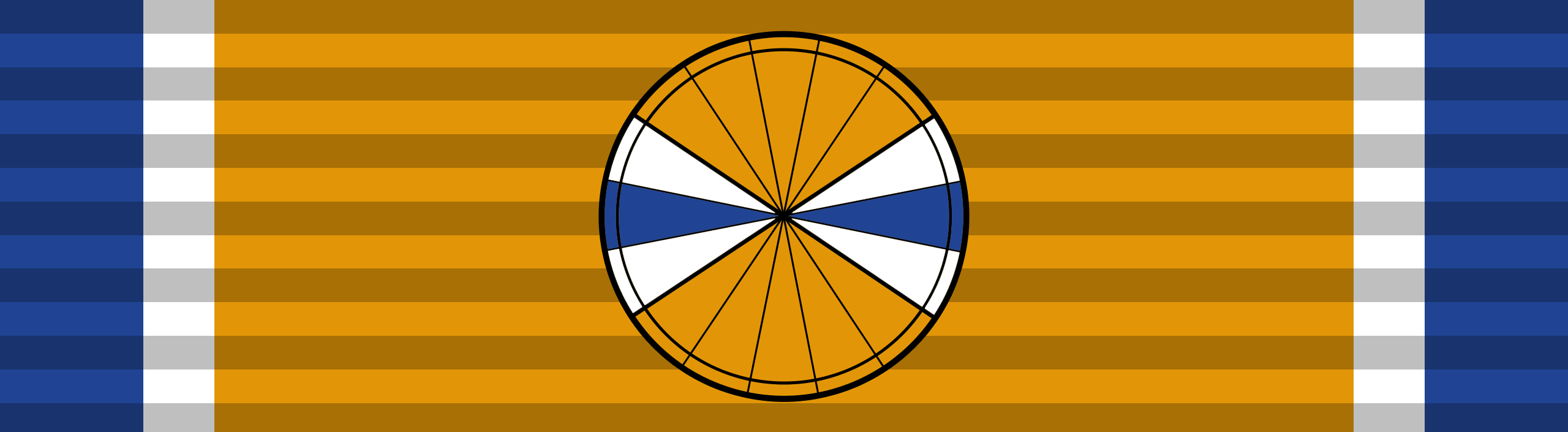
Order of Orange-Nassau - Officer

In 1955, she was awarded the rank of Officer in the Order of Orange Nassau.

Streets have been named in her honour in Almere, Leiden, Heerhugowaard and Spijkenisse.
