= Wieringermeer =

- Former municipality
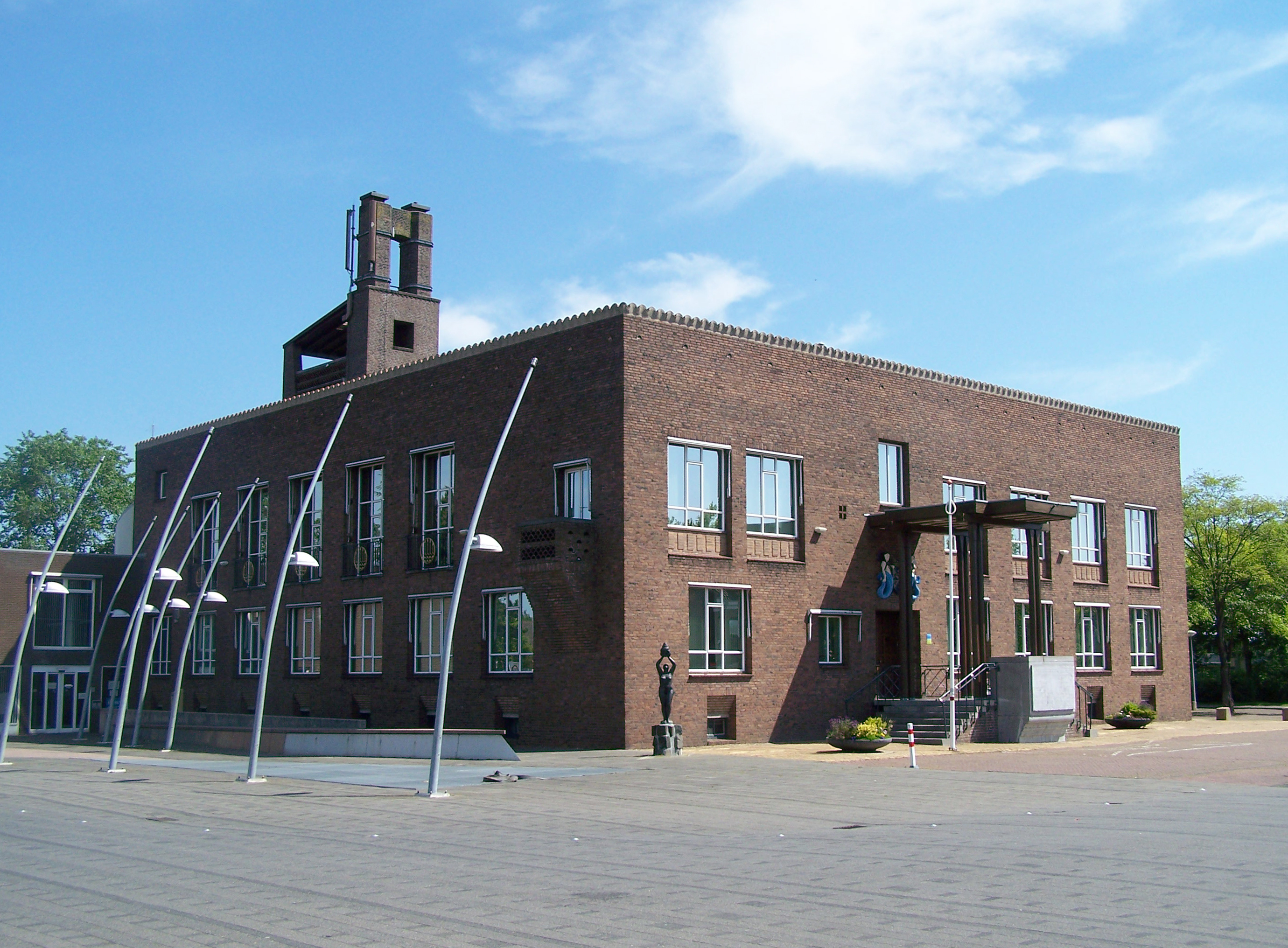
- Town hall

- Flag Coat of arms

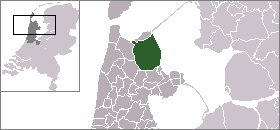
- Coordinates: 52.85°N 5.03°E
- Country: Netherlands
- Province: North Holland
- Municipality: Hollands Kroon

Area (2006)
  - Total: 307.76 km^{2} (118.83 sq mi)
  - Land: 194.82 km^{2} (75.22 sq mi)
  - Water: 112.94 km^{2} (43.61 sq mi)

Population (1 January 2007)
  - Total: 12,676
  - Density: 65/km^{2} (170/sq mi)
- Source: CBS, Statline.
- Time zone: UTC+1 (CET)
  - Summer (DST): UTC+2 (CEST)
- Website: www.wieringermeer.nl

Wieringermeer (Dutch pronunciation: [ˈʋiːrɪŋərˌmeːr]) is a polder and former municipality in the Netherlands, in the province of North Holland. Since 2012 Wieringermeer has been a part of the municipality of Hollands Kroon.

== Population centres ==
The municipality of Wieringermeer consisted of the following small towns and villages: Kreileroord, Middenmeer, Slootdorp, Wieringerwerf.

== History ==
In 1000 CE, this area was dry land. It became a flood plain after storms in 1100 CE. Wieringmeer means "Wieringen Lake", the name of an inland lake that filled the area in the early medieval period.

The Wieringmeerpolder is a polder, newly created land, and part of the Zuiderzee Works developed in the 20th century. Construction began in 1927, earlier than planned, due to a severe lack of agricultural land. The dikes had to be strong enough to withstand the force of the Zuiderzee. Draining of the polder was finished on 21 August 1930. After completion of the Afsluitdijk in 1932, lake IJsselmeer was formed from the waters.

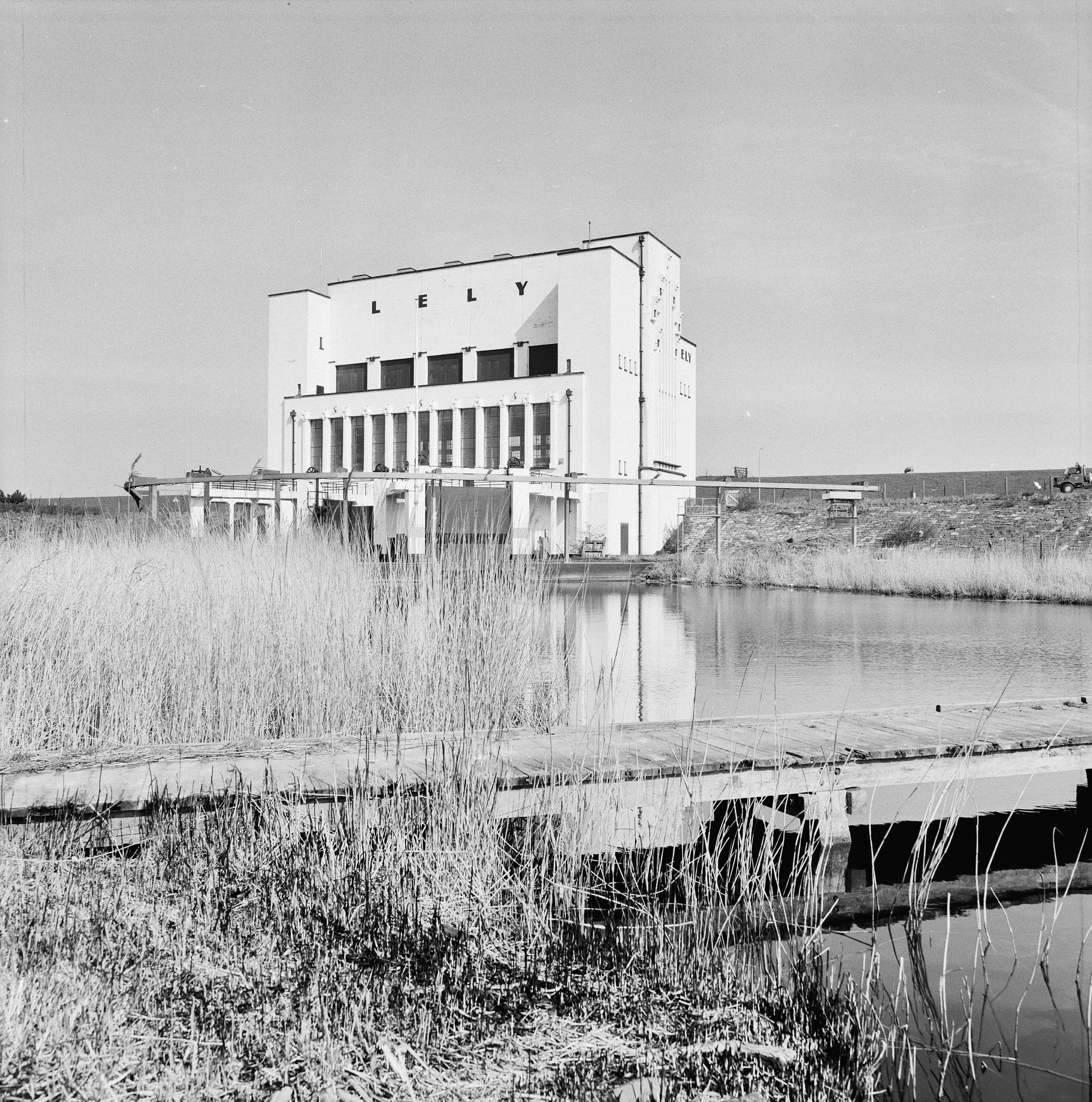
The huge Lely pumping station lies at the southern end of Wieringermeer near Medemblik and keeps the polder dry.

After desalinization, the new land became usable in 1934. Four villages (Slootdorp (1931), Middenmeer (1933), Wieringerwerf (1936) and Kreileroord (1957)), were established there.

On 1 July 1941, the Wieringermeer became an independent municipality.

On 17 April 1945, during the Second World War, the German occupiers ordered the dike of the Wieringermeer to be blown up: the area was inundated. No one was killed as the polder slowly submerged again (the inhabitants had been warned), but the high water and a subsequent storm destroyed most of the infrastructure built in the previous decade. The floodwater was fresh water, so the land did not have to be desalinated again. Reconstruction followed quickly; by the end of 1945, the polder was declared drained again. Rebuilding of roads and bridges, houses and farms, was greatly facilitated by the experience of building them the first time.

== Local government ==
The former municipal council of Wieringermeer consisted of 15 seats, which at the final election in 2010 divided as follows:

- CDA - 3 seats
- VVD - 3 seats
- Progressief Wieringermeer - 2 seats
- Onafhankelijk Wieringermeer '04 - 2 seats
- Gemeente Belangen Wieringermeer - 2 seats
- PvdA - 2 seats
- Christian Union - 1 seat

Elections were held in November 2011 for a council for the new merged municipality of Hollands Kroon that included Wieringermeer, which commenced work in January 2012.
