= Zuiderzee Works =

Land reclamation in the Netherlands

Coordinates: 52.821°N 5.269°E

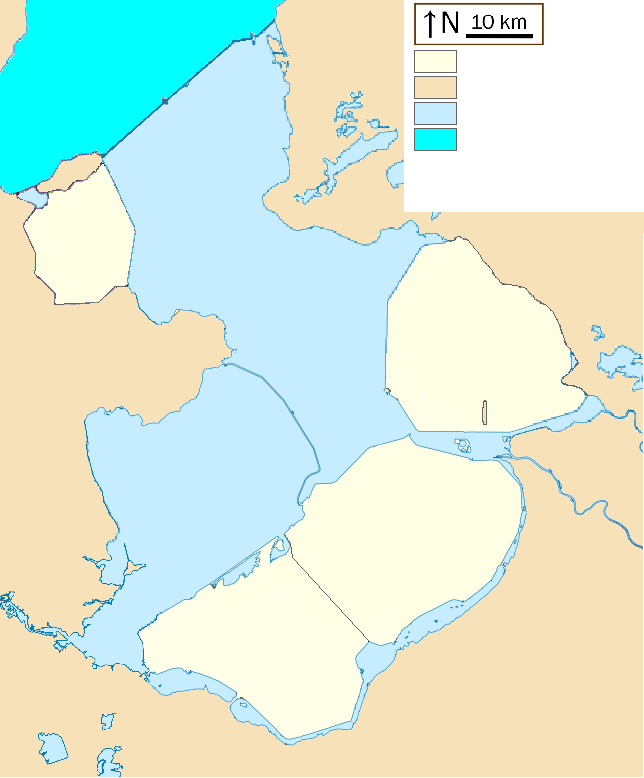
Zuiderzee works

The Zuiderzee Works (Dutch: Zuiderzeewerken) is a system of dams and dikes, land reclamation and water drainage work, which was the largest hydraulic engineering project undertaken by the Netherlands during the twentieth century. The project involved the damming of the Zuiderzee, a large, shallow inlet of the North Sea, and the reclamation of land in the newly enclosed water using polders. Its main purposes are to improve flood protection and create additional land for agriculture.

The enormous scale of the works required the creation of a joint venture company comprising several large dredging contractors, known as the Maatschappij tot Uitvoering van Zuiderzeewerken. The American Society of Civil Engineers declared the works, together with the Delta Works in the South-West of the Netherlands, as among the Seven Wonders of the Modern World.

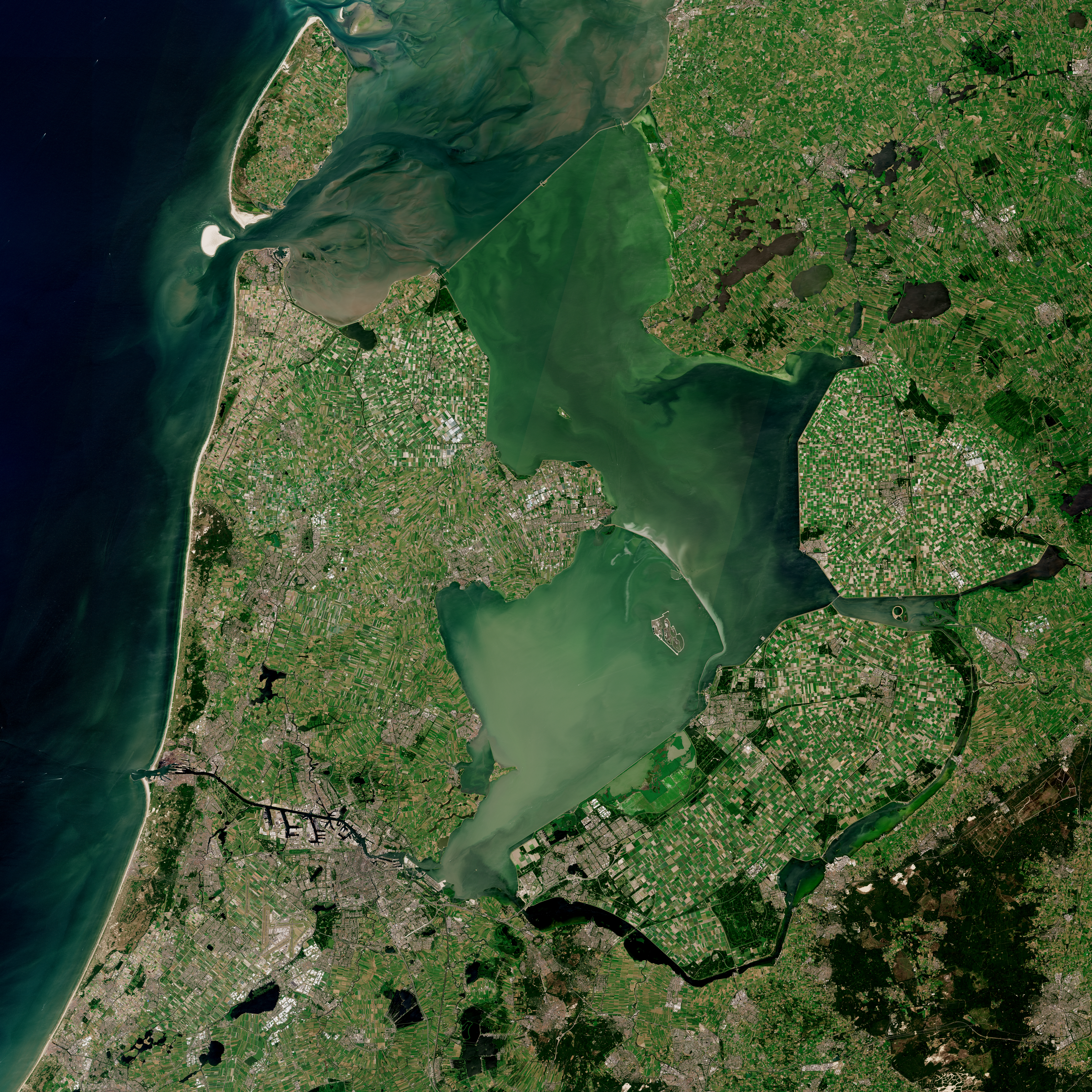
Sentinel-2 photo of the IJsselmeer and surroundings.

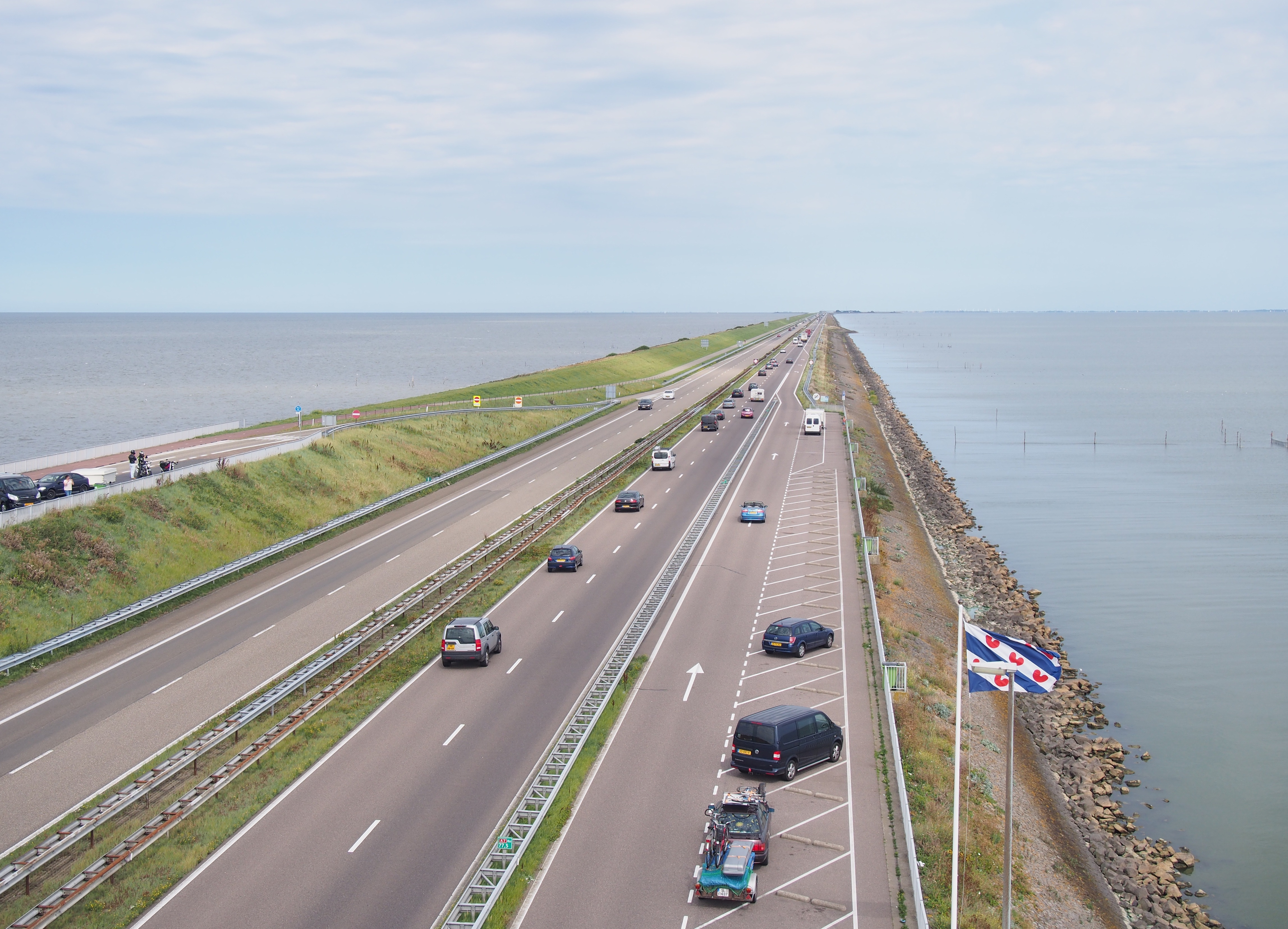
The 32 km Afsluitdijk separates the IJsselmeer (right) from the Wadden Sea (left), protecting thousands of km^{2} of land.

== Background ==
The Low Countries have low flat topography, with half the land area below or less than 1 m (3 ft 3 in) above sea level, and have for centuries been subject to periodic flooding by the sea. The seventeenth century saw early proposals to tame and enclose the Zuiderzee, but the ambitious ideas were impractical given the technology then available.

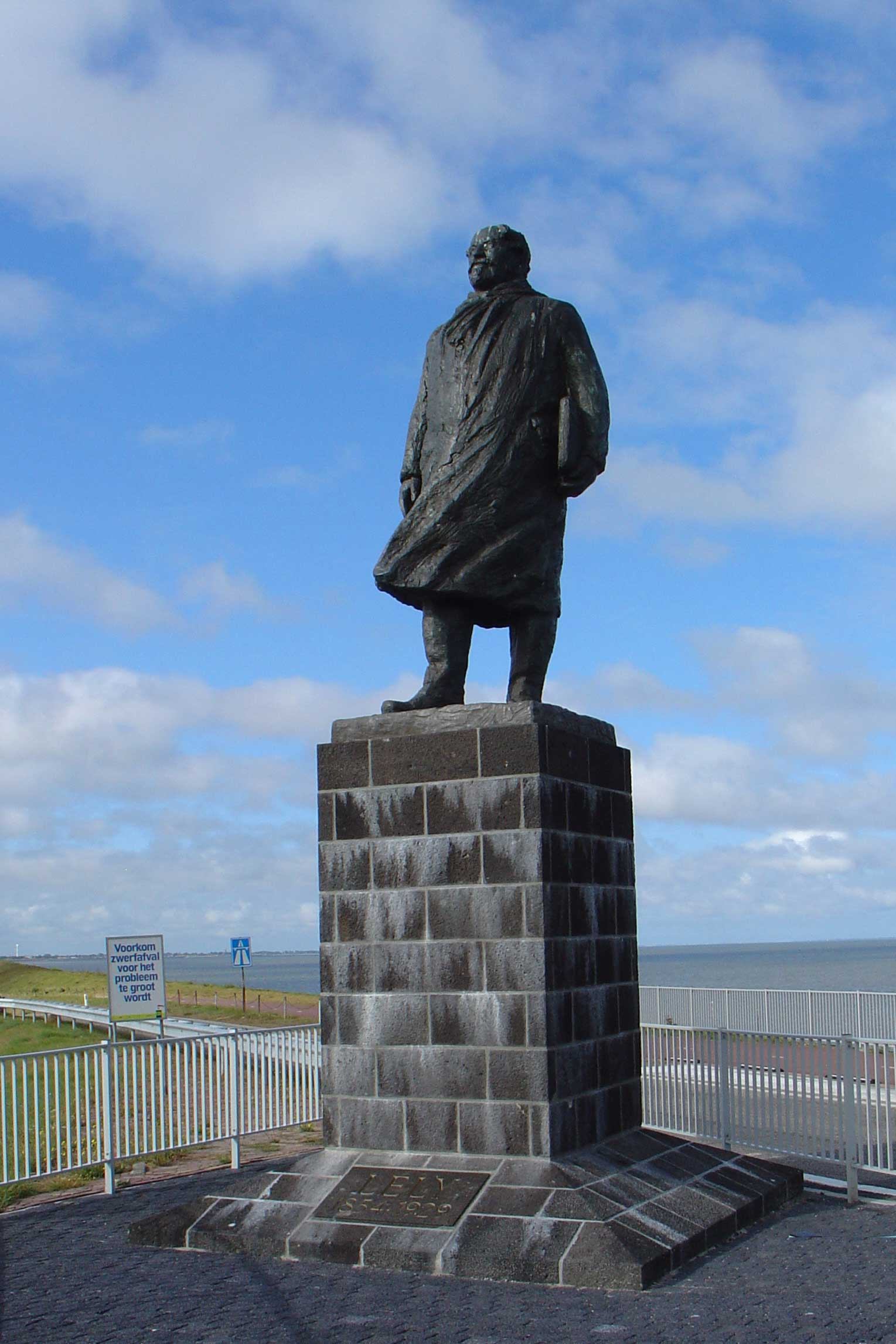
Statue of Cornelis Lely on the Afsluitdijk

From 1200 to 1900 AD the Dutch reclaimed 940,000 acres (380,000 ha) of land from the sea and 345,000 acres (140,000 ha) by draining lakes, a total of 1,285,000 acres (520,000 ha), but lost 1,400,000 acres (570,000 ha) of land to the Zuiderzee. Hendrik Stevin in 1667 was the first to publish a study ("How the Fury of the North Sea may be stopped and Holland may be protected against it") proposing to drain the Zuiderzee. After the IJ and Haarlemmermeer were drained in the mid-19th century, van Diggelen, Kloppenburg, and Faddegon proposed that the Zuiderzee also be drained. Test drilling by the Zuiderzeevereeniging found that about three quarters of the Zuiderzee would be useful land. Plans were developed during the second half of the nineteenth century to protect areas from the force of the open sea and creating new agricultural land. Cornelis Lely (after whom Lelystad is named) was an ardent supporter, an engineer, and later government minister. A group called the "Zuider Zee Society" began a thorough investigation as to the best means of closing and draining the Zuider Zee in 1886, and in 1891 Lely introduced his plan, which formed the basis for the development of what were to become the Zuiderzee Works. It consisted of a large dam connecting the northern tip of North Holland with the western coast of Friesland and the creation of initially four polders in the northwest, the northeast, southeast (later split in two), and southwest of what would be renamed the IJsselmeer (IJssel-lake). Two major lanes of open water were defined for shipping and drainage. The initial body of water affected by the project was 3,500 square kilometres (1,350 sq mi). Opposition came from fishermen along the Zuiderzee who would lose their livelihood, and from others in coastal areas along the more northerly Wadden Sea. They feared higher water levels as a result of the closure. Other critics doubted whether the project was feasible financially.

Queen Wilhelmina's speech from the throne in 1913 urged reclamation of the Zuiderzee, and the requisite bill was introduced. When Lely became Minister of Transport and Public Works that year, he used his position to promote the Zuiderzee Works and gained support. The government started developing official plans to enclose the Zuiderzee. On 13 and 14 January 1916 the dikes at several places along the Zuiderzee broke under the stress of a winter storm, and the land behind them flooded, as had often happened in previous centuries. This flooding provided the decisive impetus to implement the existing plans to tame the Zuiderzee. In addition, a threatening food shortage during the other stresses of World War I added to widespread support for the project. Lely stressed the importance of extending the area of arable land, and estimated that 500,000 acres (200,000 ha) of good land would be reclaimed from the clay soil, while the regions with a sand bottom would eventually become the IJsselmeer.

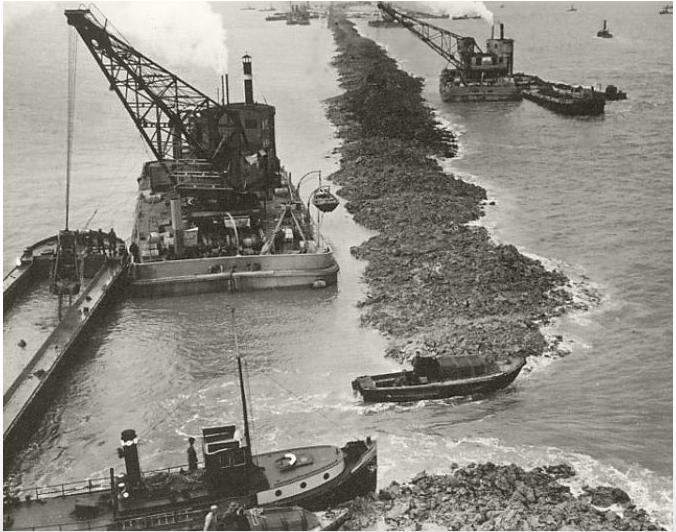
Construction of the Afsluitdijk

On 14 June 1918, the Zuiderzee Act was passed. The goals of the Act were threefold:

- Protect the central Netherlands from the effects of the North Sea;
- Increase the Dutch food supply by development and cultivation of new agricultural land; and
- Improve water management by creating a freshwater lake from the former uncontrolled salt water inlet.

Unlike earlier proposals the act intended to preserve part of the Zuiderzee and create large islands, as Lely warned that rerouting the rivers directly to the North Sea might cause inland flooding if storms raised the sea's level. He also wanted to preserve the Zee's fisheries, and for the new land to be accessible by water. The Dienst der Zuiderzeewerken (Zuiderzee Works Department), the government body responsible for overseeing the construction and initial management, was set up in May 1919. In the initial stages of the work heavy clay was dredged out of the open sea and deposited along the track to be followed by the dam. The cost of the undertaking was calculated in 1914, in UK currency, at about £19,000,000 but it soon seemed likely to be very much more. At the time, ten years were allowed for the construction of the main dam and another 20 years for the completion of the four inner enclosures.

The department decided against building the main dam first, proceeding to construct a smaller dam, the Amsteldiepdijk, across the Amsteldiep. This was the first step in rejoining the island of Wieringen to the North Holland mainland. The dike, with a length of 2.5 km (1.6 mi), was built between 1920 and 1924. As with dike building, polder construction was tested on a small scale at the experimental polder at Andijk.

== Construction phase ==
=== Enclosure ===
The Zuiderzee Works in the Netherlands divided the dangerous Zuiderzee, a shallow inlet of the North Sea, into the tame lakes of IJsselmeer and Markermeer, and created 1650 km^{2} of land.

A new study, commissioned after doubts arose over the financial feasibility of the project, recommended that work should continue and be accelerated. The Zuiderzee Works Department initiated the next two major projects at the same time, in 1927. The most important of these was the main dam, the Afsluitdijk (enclosure dam), running from Den Oever on Wieringen to the village of Zurich in Friesland. It was to be 32 km long and 90 meters wide, rising to 7.25 meters above sea-level, with an incline of 25% on each side.

Experience showed that glacial till, rather than just sand or clay, was the best primary material for a structure like the Afsluitdijk. An added benefit was that it was easily available; it could be retrieved in large quantities by dredging it from the bottom of the Zuiderzee. Work started at four points: on both sides of the mainland and on two purpose-made construction-islands (Kornwerderzand and Breezanddijk) along the line of the future dam.

From these points, the dam was expanded as ships deposited till into the open sea in two parallel lines. Sand was poured between these two lines; as the fill emerged above the surface of the water, it was covered by another layer of till. The nascent dam was strengthened with basalt rocks and mats of willow switch at its base. The dam was finished by raising it with sand and finally clay for the upper surface of the dam, which was planted with grass.

Construction progressed better than expected. At three points along the line of the dam were underwater gullies, where the tidal current was much stronger than elsewhere. These had been considered major obstacles to completing the dam but proved not to be so. On 28 May 1932, two years earlier than forecast, the Zuiderzee was closed when the last tidal trench of the Vlieter was filled with a bucket of till. The IJsselmeer was born, though the lake still contained salt water at the time.

The dam was not finished. It still needed to be brought up to its full height, and a road linking Friesland and North Holland remained to be built. In addition to completing the dam, work needed was the construction of shipping locks and discharge sluices at the ends of the dam. The complex at Den Oever includes the Stevin lock and three series of five sluices for discharging the IJsselmeer into the Wadden Sea. The other complex at Kornwerderzand is composed of the Lorentz locks and two series of five sluices, making a total of 25 discharge sluices. Periodically discharging the lake is necessary since it is continually fed by rivers and streams (most notably the IJssel River, for which the lake is named) and polders draining excess water into the IJsselmeer.

The Afsluitdijk was opened 25 September 1933, with a monument marking the spot where the dam was finished. It used 23 million m^{3} of sand and 13.5 million m^{3} of till. An average of 4,000 to 5,000 workers were employed in the dam's construction, relieving unemployment during the Great Depression. The total cost of the dam was about €700 million (2004 equivalent).

Project	Dike	Length	Start	Closure	Size	Drained
Connection of the island of Wieringen to continental Holland	Amsteldiepdijk	2.5 km	29 June 1920	31 July 1924	—	—
Closure of the Zuyderzee	Afsluitdijk	32 km	January 1927	23 May 1932	—	—
Pilot Polder Andijk	-	1.9 km	1926	Early 1927	40 ha	27 August 1927
Wieringermeer Polder	-	18 km	1927	27 July 1929	20,000 ha	31 August 1930
Noordoostpolder	-	55 km	1936	13 December 1940	48,000 ha	9 September 1942
Eastern Flevoland Polder	-	90 km	Early 1950	13 September 1956	54,000 ha	29 June 1957
Southern Flevoland Polder	-	70 km	Early 1959	25 October 1967	43,000 ha	29 May 1968
Marker Wadden Polder	Houtribdijk	28 km	Late 2012	The project is still under construction as of 2021. The first island was completed in late 2020.	2,500 ha	24 September 2016

=== Land reclamation ===
After damming off the sea, the next step involved creating new land, known as polders. This was achieved by damming off portions of the IJsselmeer, and then pumping all the water out. The first polder, Wieringermeer, was dammed in 1929 and fully drained in 1930. The third, the Noordoostpolder, was not fully drained until 1942. It was an area much used by the Dutch Underground resistance during World War II, as the fresh polder offered numerous hiding places.

After the war, work was started on draining the Flevolands, a massive project totalling almost 1000 km^{2}. This area is now home to Lelystad and Almere; the latter is the fastest growing city in the Netherlands (in part because of its proximity to Amsterdam). Another large polder was originally planned in the Markermeer. This project was extensively debated until plans were abandoned in the early 2000s, as environmental issues were viewed differently than in the 1920s. A new province, Flevoland, was created out of the Noordoostpolder and the Flevolands in 1986, thereby completing the Works.

This new land led to an identity change for towns including Lemmer, Vollenhove, Blokzijl due to losing their direct access to the sea and Kuinre was completely cut off from open water. The former islands of Urk and Schokland, and Wieringen got connected to the mainland.

The other major project started in 1927 was the construction of the 200 km^{2} (77 sq mi) polder in the northwest, the first and the smallest of the five projected polders. It replaced the Wieringermeer, the body of water south of Wieringen, and also the name of the new polder. It was the only polder reclaimed from the Zuiderzee itself (the others were reclaimed after the Afsluitdijk was finished), but it wasn't entirely the first. A small test polder of some 0.4 km^{2} was constructed in 1926—1927 near Andijk in North Holland to research the effects drainage would have on the soil of the Zuiderzee and how best to configure the new polders.

Building the encircling dike for the Wieringermeer was harder than it was for the later polders, because the Wieringermeer dikes were built before the completion of the Afsluitdijk. That meant the tidal currents of the Zuiderzee were still present. As a consequence, they were somewhat higher. Construction started on the 18 km (11 mi) dike from Den Oever on Wieringen and the new construction-island of Oude Zeug and progressed satisfactorily. The Wieringermeer was closed off from the Zuiderzee in July 1929. The next step was draining all the water from the future polder.

Drainage of a polder is performed by a pumping station or mill (gemaal in Dutch). Two were built for the Wieringermeer, the Leemans, a diesel powered station, near Den Oever and the Lely, an electrically powered one, near Medemblik. Different power systems were used in the stations as a safety mechanism. If one station lost power, the other one would still be able to keep the polder dry. The pumping mechanism itself was based on a variation of Archimedes' screw, as designed by A. Baldwin Wood. The stations, completed in February 1930, managed to drain the polder after six months of continuous pumping. "Drained" in this context does not mean the land was wholly dry; extensive pools of shallow water still littered the muddy landscape. To make the soil usable it had to be further drained by a network of drainage canals. Small ditches were dug leading to larger watercourses, which in turn transported their water to the main drainage canals. These canals, dredged when the polder was still filled with water, conducted surplus water to the pumping stations. The resulting dehydration caused the former seabed to sink by over a metre in some places. Once the ground had settled, the smaller ditches were replaced with underground drainage tubes, which would be used for the normal drainage of the polder.

Land Usage of the Polders (percentage of total surface area)
Polder	Size	Agriculture	Housing	Nature	Infrastructure
Wieringermeer	200 km^{2}	87%	1%	3%	9%
Noordoostpolder	480 km^{2}	87%	1%	5%	7%
Eastern Flevoland	540 km^{2}	75%	8%	11%	6%
Southern Flevoland	430 km^{2}	50%	25%	18%	7%

With the hydrological infrastructure in place, the virgin land was developed to prepare for its later cultivation. The first plant to establish itself, though more so in the later polders than in the Wieringermeer, was reed, sown from the air by plane onto the muddy flats while the polder was still being drained. This sturdy plant helped evaporate the water and bring air into the soil, thereby solidifying its structure and further preventing the emergence of unwanted weeds.

After the first infrastructure was put in place, the reed was burnt and replaced by rapeseed, turning the newborn polder into a yellow sea of flowers in spring. These crops were succeeded by various grains. In the Wieringermeer the first was rye, but the later polders plant wheat, then barley, and finally oats. This process took years, but once finished allowed planting other crops. At the same time, other infrastructures such as roads and housing were built.

The Wieringermeer and later polders were divided into plots of about 50 acres (20 ha). The best land is used for vegetables; the next best for rye and other grain; and the worst land is forested. Each plot has a paved road in the front and a canal in the back to make it accessible by land and water. A terp in the center of the polder is built higher than the highest recorded flood level of the North Sea to protect people if the dike fails; the Wieringermeer terp is large enough to hold the population of Amsterdam.

During the German occupation of the Netherlands in World War II the invading forces at first did not interfere; their engineers inspected the project as a model for reclaiming the Frische Haff. In 1945 retreating Germans ordered the inundation of the Wieringermeer, but it was drained again afterwards and the damage repaired.

== Polders ==
=== Wieringermeer ===
The Wieringermeer, as the first of the envisioned five polders, served as a major testbed for ideas and techniques for the following projects. It is closest to the original concept of the new land being primarily used as agricultural land and it has retained a strong rural character. Four villages eventually were formed in the polder: Slootdorp (1931), Middenmeer (1933), Wieringerwerf (1936), and Kreileroord (1957).

Local governance presented a new problem. The area was divided among the mainland municipalities according to the boundaries used when it was water-covered. This configuration was not always practical on the ground and unnecessarily split responsibilities among several bodies. The first solution was a form of government called an openbaar lichaam or "public body", a complicated arrangement which incorporated both the government body in charge of the actual development and an appointed committee responsible for public governance. As the polder became more populated, the demand for representation increased until finally on 1 July 1941, the municipality of Wieringermeer was established.

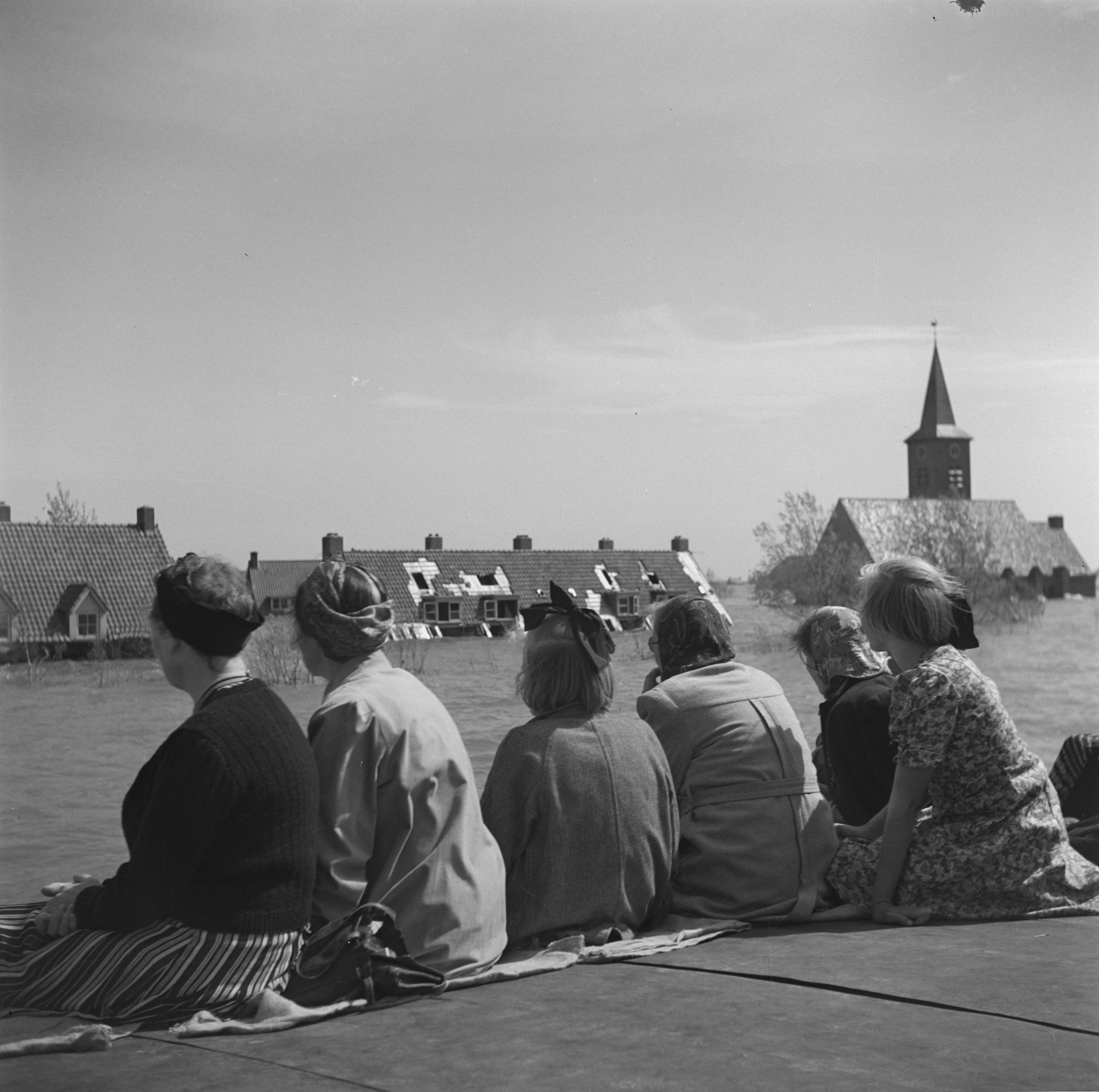
Flooding of the Wieringermeer following damage to the dykes during World War II

On 17 April 1945, in the closing days of World War II, the Wehrmacht breached the Wieringermeer dike with explosives to flood the polder and prevent allied advance. No casualties were incurred, but the high water and a subsequent storm destroyed most of the infrastructure built in the previous decade as well as all crops. Reconstruction followed quickly, and by the end of 1945 the polder was declared drained again.

=== Noordoostpolder ===
The original 1891 plan called for the largest, southeastern polder to be built after the Wieringermeer, but it was decided in 1932 to give precedence to the northeastern one, which was smaller and therefore considered easier. This would be the Noordoostpolder (Northeast-polder). Due to initial financial difficulties, construction did not begin until 1936. Two dikes, totaling 55 km in length, steadily grew in the IJsselmeer, one from Lemmer in Friesland to the island of Urk, the other from Vollenhove in Overijssel to Urk. Construction of these dikes and the necessary pumping stations was disrupted during World War II during the 1940 German conquest of the Netherlands. The encircling dikes were both closed in December 1940, and the pumping stations started draining in early 1941. The Noordoostpolder was considered to be sufficiently drained in September 1942, and the developmental process was started for the 480 km^{2} of new land.

The task of building the Noordoostpolder was eased by the earlier experience, the now placid waters of the IJsselmeer, and the mechanisation of the construction process. Machines, sometimes made specifically for the Zuiderzee Works, were increasingly used for this and the final polders. Land usage was much the same as in the Wieringermeer, again focusing on farming. Less fertile areas were designated to be planted as forest land. Land in the polders was state-owned during the entire developmental process. Several years after this was completed, the various plots were distributed among private parties, with priority given to the early pioneers who had been in the polder since the start. Later, farmers from all over the Netherlands became eligible for the remainder. Candidates were put through a selection process before receiving their own pieces of new land.

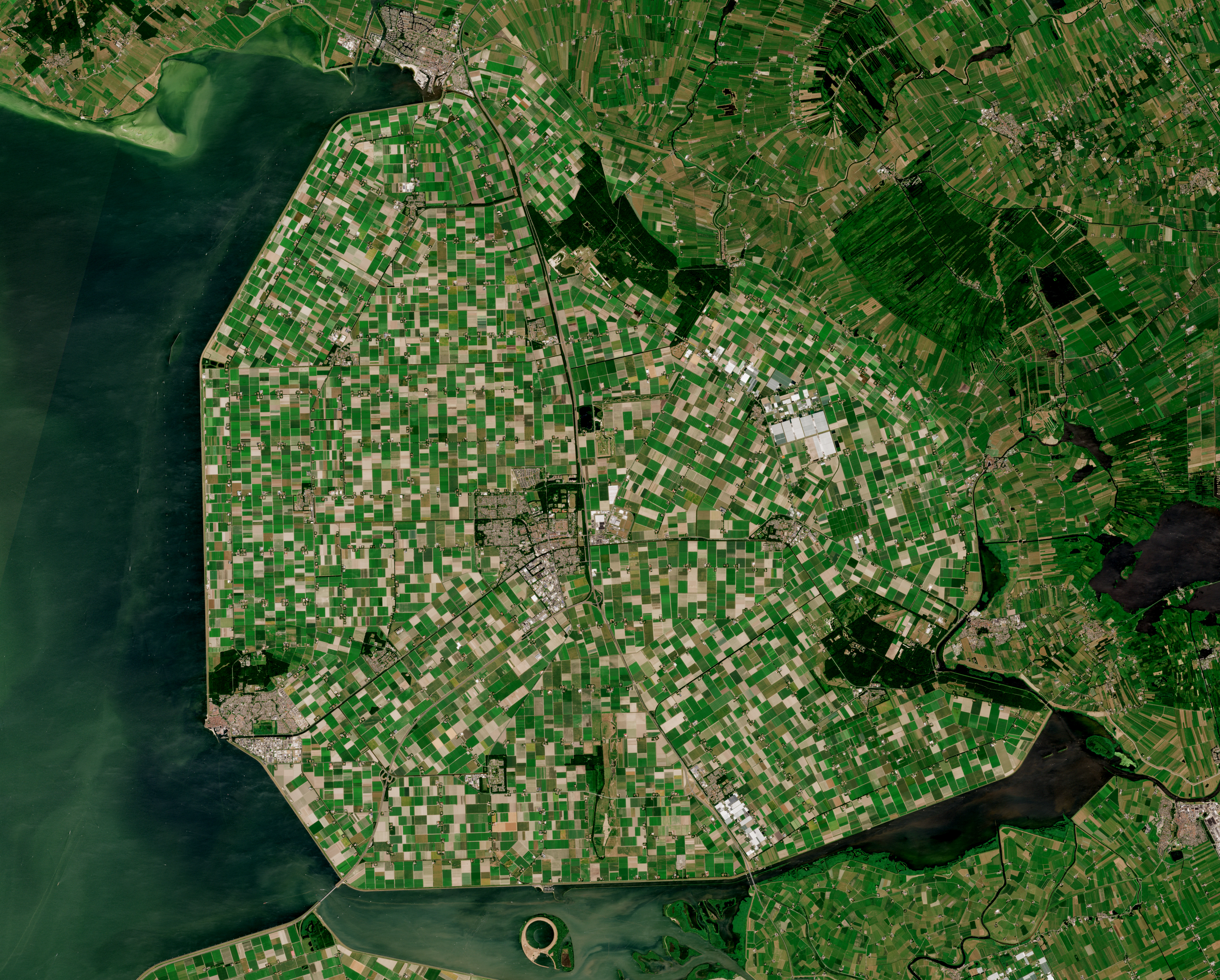
Satellite picture of Noordoostpolder

The North Sea flood of 1953 made the government change its priorities. Instead of granting the new land only to farmers selected for their skill, the government granted land to a large number of farmers from the flooded province of Zeeland.

The polder contains two former islands: the glacial moraine hill of Urk, and the elongated strip of peat land known as Schokland, largely abandoned in the 19th century. Urk was then and is still today a fishing community and it served as a natural construction-island for both dikes as well as a base of operations for the later exploitation of the polder. Both ceased to be islands: Urk on 3 October 1939, when the dike reaching from Lemmer was closed and Schokland when the surrounding water was consequently drained. Both islands stand out in the new land, physically and figuratively. The community of Urk in particular has remained an entity somewhat distinct from the "mainland". It is a separate municipality from the rest of the polder, which was organized as the municipality of Noordoostpolder in 1962. The town of Kuinre was cut off from the open water, losing businesses and status.

At the heart of the Noordoostpolder, where the three main drainage canals intersect, is the town of Emmeloord (1943). Planned to be the first and the only major town of the polder, it serves as the local governmental and services center. Ten smaller villages, conceived more as agricultural communities, were planned in a wide circle around Emmeloord, at a distance chosen to be easily covered by bicycle. The first settlements were Ens, Marknesse and Kraggenburg (1949), followed by Luttelgeest (1950), Bant (1951), then Creil and Rutten (1953), and finally Espel, Tollebeek, and Nagele (1956). From Emmeloord three canals carry their water to three pumping stations, the Buma near Lemmer, the Smeenge at Vollenhove, and finally the Vissering in Urk. The first two are electrically powered (though connected to different power-plants), while the latter one has diesel power. Like all pumping stations of the Zuiderzee Works, they are named for individuals who made significant contributions to the project.

=== The Flevolands ===
==== Eastern Flevoland ====
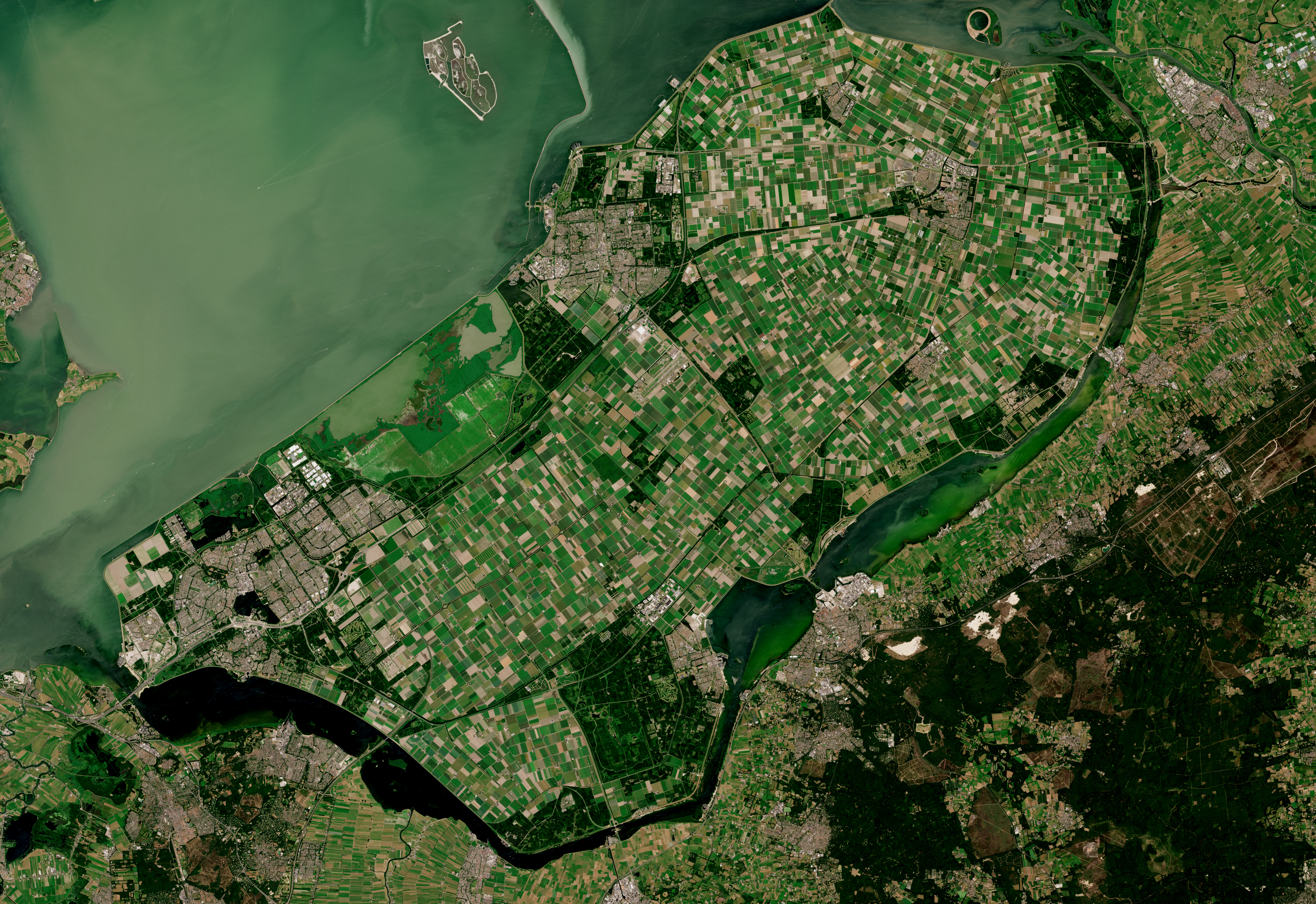
Zuidelijk and Oostelijk Flevoland (Southern and Eastern Flevoland)

The period following World War II was spent restoring the Wieringermeerpolder and catching up with work on the Noordoostpolder. Soon attention turned towards the next project: Eastern Flevoland (Oostelijk Flevoland), which at 540 km^{2} was the largest of the new polders. In 1950 work commenced on several construction-islands in the middle of the IJsselmeer, the largest of which would be Lelystad-Haven, which initially housed a community of dike-builders.

The experience of the Noordoostpolder had shown that groundwater from the higher old mainland would flow to the lower new land, causing subsidence and dehydration in the old land. It was decided to use geohydrology to detach the new polders from the mainland. A string of peripheral lakes have been left between the two, requiring a much longer dike of 90 km (56 mi) to encircle the polder.

The plans for a single south-eastern polder were changed to construct two separate polders with a joint hydrological infrastructure. They were divided by a dike in the middle, the Knardijk, which would keep one polder safe should the other be flooded. The two main drainage canals to traverse the dike could be closed by weirs in such a flooding event. The eastern polder was planned to be the first, and the encircling dike began to take form in 1951. It progressed until the North Sea flood of 1953 struck the south-western Netherlands. Workers and machinery were transferred there for repair work (additional work here was part of the Delta Works).

Work on Eastern Flevoland resumed in 1954 and the dike was closed on 13 September 1956. The pumping stations started draining the polder that same day, completing the task in June 1957. Three pumping stations were built: the Wortman (diesel-powered) at Lelystad-Haven, the Lovink near Harderwijk and the Colijn (both electrically powered) along the northern dike beside the Ketelmeer. All three were built with extra capacity with the future southern polder in mind.

A new element in the design of this polder was the intention to establish a larger city to serve as a regional centre for all the polders and perhaps the capital of a potential new province. This city, located in the centre of the reclaimed lands, was developed as Lelystad (1966), named after the man who had played a crucial role in the design and realisation of the Zuiderzee Works. Other more conventional settlements had already developed by then; Dronten, the local major town, was founded in 1962, followed in 1963 by two smaller satellite villages, Swifterbant and Biddinghuizen. These last three were incorporated into the new municipality of Dronten on 1 January 1972. Lelystad was large enough to be organized as a separate municipality on 1 January 1980.

Though agriculture was initially the main purpose of the polder, needs of the post-war period changed the design goals of the new polders. Changing agricultural needs and increased motorised mobility meant many farming villages were unnecessary and the number of towns was eventually reduced to two. Work on the village of Larsen was just about to start when it was cancelled. The amount of agricultural land did not increase; it diminished as a result of the building of Lelystad (a city envisioned to eventually house at least 100,000 inhabitants.) By 2005 it had 70,000 residents. In addition, more area was assigned for development as forests and nature reserves, a trend that would continue in the next polder.

==== Southern Flevoland ====
Southern Flevoland (Zuidelijk Flevoland) was the fourth polder of the Zuiderzee Works, built adjacent to its larger sibling, Eastern Flevoland. Since its northeastern dike, the aforementioned Knardijk, already existed, only 70 km (43 mi) of the dike remained to be built. Starting in early 1959, this was finished in October 1967.

Only one pumping station ('gemaal'), the diesel-powered De Blocq van Kuffeler, needed to be built because of the hydrological union of the two Flevolands; once the polder was finished it would simply join the previous three in maintaining the water-level of both polders. Before it could do that however the newest gemaal had to first drain the 430 km^{2} (170 sq mi) polder of its water by itself, completing its job in May 1968.

Due to the geographically favourable location of the southern polder to the heavily urbanised centre of the Netherlands and in particular Amsterdam, the planners devised a design that would include a large new urban area, to be called Almere, in order to relieve the housing shortage and increasing overcrowding on the old land. Almere was to be divided into 3 major settlements, initially; the first, Almere-Haven (1976), situated along the Gooimeer (one of the peripheral lakes), the second and largest, Almere-Stad (Almere City) (1980), which was to fulfil the role of city centre, and the third, Almere-Buiten (1984), to the northeast towards Lelystad.

The area between Lelystad and Almere was designated for heavy industries, but since enough space was still available on the old land for those industries this part of the polder was left alone for the mean time. After only a couple of years this landscape of shallow pools, islets and swamps became a popular resting and foraging area for many species of waterfowl, to the extent that it rapidly turned into a nature reserve of national significance. Although accidental in origin, the Oostvaardersplassen as they are known became by the 1970s the definitive destination for this section of the polder.

The centre of the polder most closely resembles the pre-war polders in that it is almost exclusively agricultural. In contrast, the south-eastern part is dominated by extensive forests. It is also home to the only other settlement of the polder, Zeewolde (1984), again a more conventional town acting as the local centre. Zeewolde became a municipality at the same time as Almere, on 1 January 1984, which in the case of Zeewolde meant that the municipality existed before the town itself, with only farms in the surrounding land to be governed until the town started to grow.

=== Markerwaard ===
Markerwaard was a planned fifth polder that has never been completed. It was intended to build a south-western polder, to be called the Markerwaard, at several times during the project, but other polders took precedence. Parts of it have been built; in 1941 it was decided to begin work on the first section of dike, but the German occupiers stopped construction that same year. This dike originated on Marken, the last of the IJsselmeer islands, and went north for some 2 km (1.2 mi) where it ends abruptly today. After World War II, the eastern polder was chosen as the next project, but Marken was not wholly ignored; on 17 October 1957, a 3.5 km (2.2 mi) long dike was closed, running south of the now former island to the North Holland mainland.

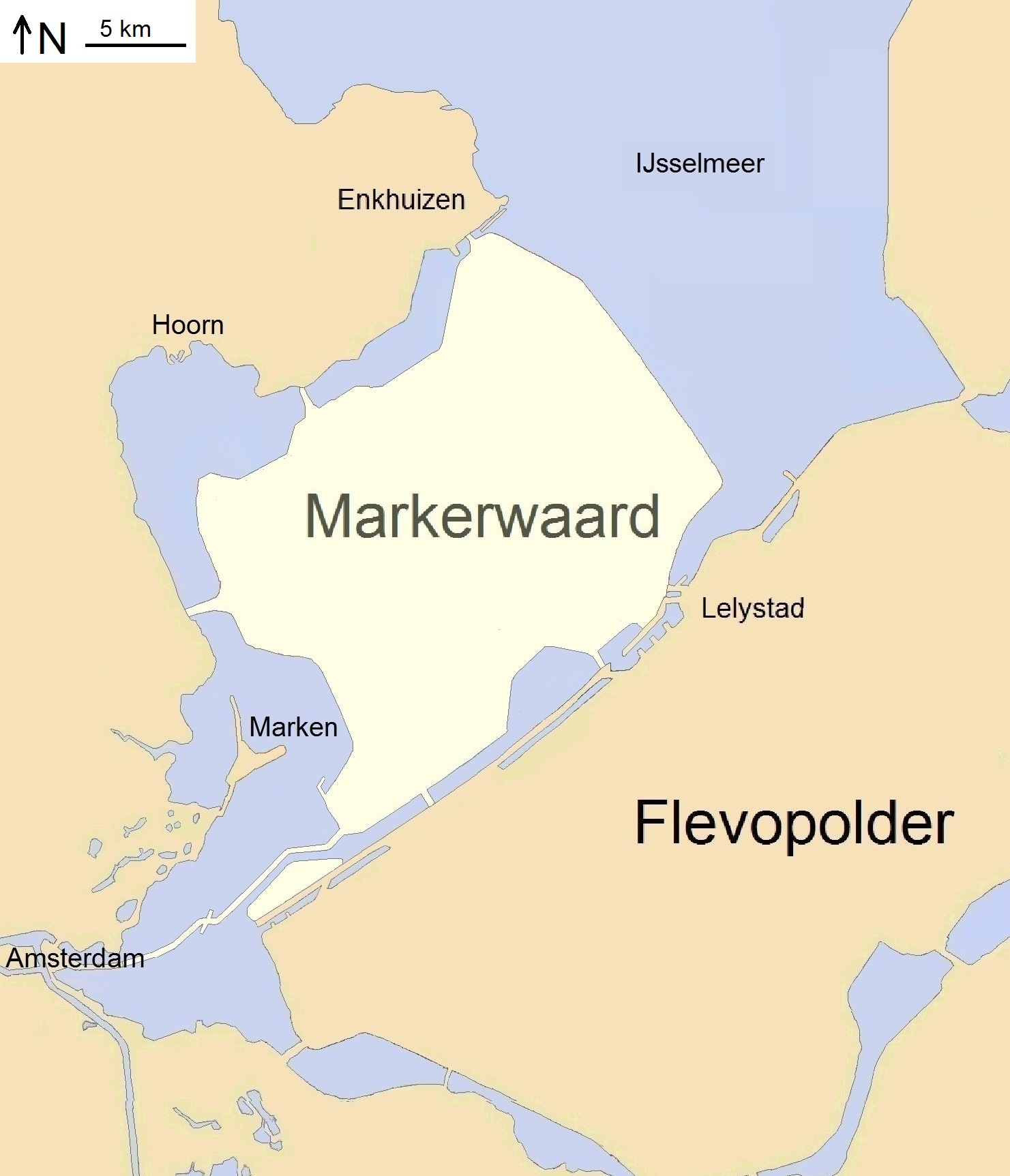
Markerwaard as envisioned in 1981

When construction started in 1959 on a new dike it had not yet been decided whether this would be the northern dike of Southern Flevoland or the southern dike of the Markerwaard, but the choice eventually fell to the former and another chance for the Markerwaard had passed. A minor flood near Amsterdam in 1960 had demonstrated the danger a large IJsselmeer still presented. A further planned element of the Markerwaard was subsequently executed: a 28 km dike between Lelystad and Enkhuizen, including two complexes of locks and discharge sluices at either end, was to split the IJsselmeer in two, with the largest portion (1,250 km^{2} (480 sq mi)) continuing as the IJsselmeer and the smaller lake (700 km^{2} (270 sq mi)) being named the Markermeer. Construction of this dike, known later as the Houtribdijk or Markerwaarddijk, progressed slowly, lasting from 1963 to 1975, after which it also served as an important road connection between the north of North Holland and the eastern Netherlands. The Houtribdijk did not, however, result in the construction of the rest of the Markerwaard, as many had hoped.

The debate on whether to build the Markerwaard continued for years. The need for new agricultural land had mostly disappeared by this time and extra space for housing was unnecessary in this region. The existing ecological and recreational value of the Markermeer was considered by many to be equal or superior to any potential such value the Markerwaard would offer. Doubts began to surface about the cost-effectiveness of the polder. The original post-war designs had called for a 410 km^{2} (160 sq mi) polder, yet many different proposals were later put forth in an effort to combine the benefits of both the Markerwaard and Markermeer, all to no avail. Although cabinets had intended to proceed with the Markerwaard, it was decided to indefinitely postpone the project in September 1986. A proposed alternative was to use the lake as a water reservoir for hydropower combined with wind-power from windmills on the dikes, eliminating the unpredictability of the latter – when there is an overcapacity of wind, use that to fill the lake and when there is not enough, use the high water level for hydro power.

In 2012, plans emerged to create the Marker Wadden, a group of islands designed to establish nature reserves in the north of the Markermeer. Contrary to the Markerwaard, no permanent human occupation is planned, although it will be accessible to tourists and birdwatchers. The creation process started in April 2016 with the first new island being inaugurated on 24 September 2016.

== Province of Flevoland ==
The loss of the Markerwaard did not affect plans to create a new province out of the polders. The older Wieringermeer in the north, long since part of North Holland, would not become a part of it, but the municipalities of the other three and the islands of the Noordoostpolder would together form the 12th province of the Netherlands, called Flevoland. The need for a new province was not immediately clear; Urk and the Noordoostpolder had been part of Overijssel up to that point and Dronten fell under Gelderland. After the new municipalities of Southern Flevoland were established in 1984, belonging to no province as was the case with Lelystad, the provincial issue required renewed attention. With only six municipalities and without the Markerwaard, the area was considered by opponents to be insufficiently populous and developed for an entire province, but the polder municipalities were unanimous in their desire: on 1 January 1986, the province of Flevoland was inaugurated. With a population of 356,400 (2004) it was the least populous province, but the province of Zeeland had only 378,300 and Flevoland has a higher population density than four other provinces. By 2015, Flevoland had surpassed Zeeland in population (403,380, compared to 380,620) and had a density of 280 persons per square kilometre.

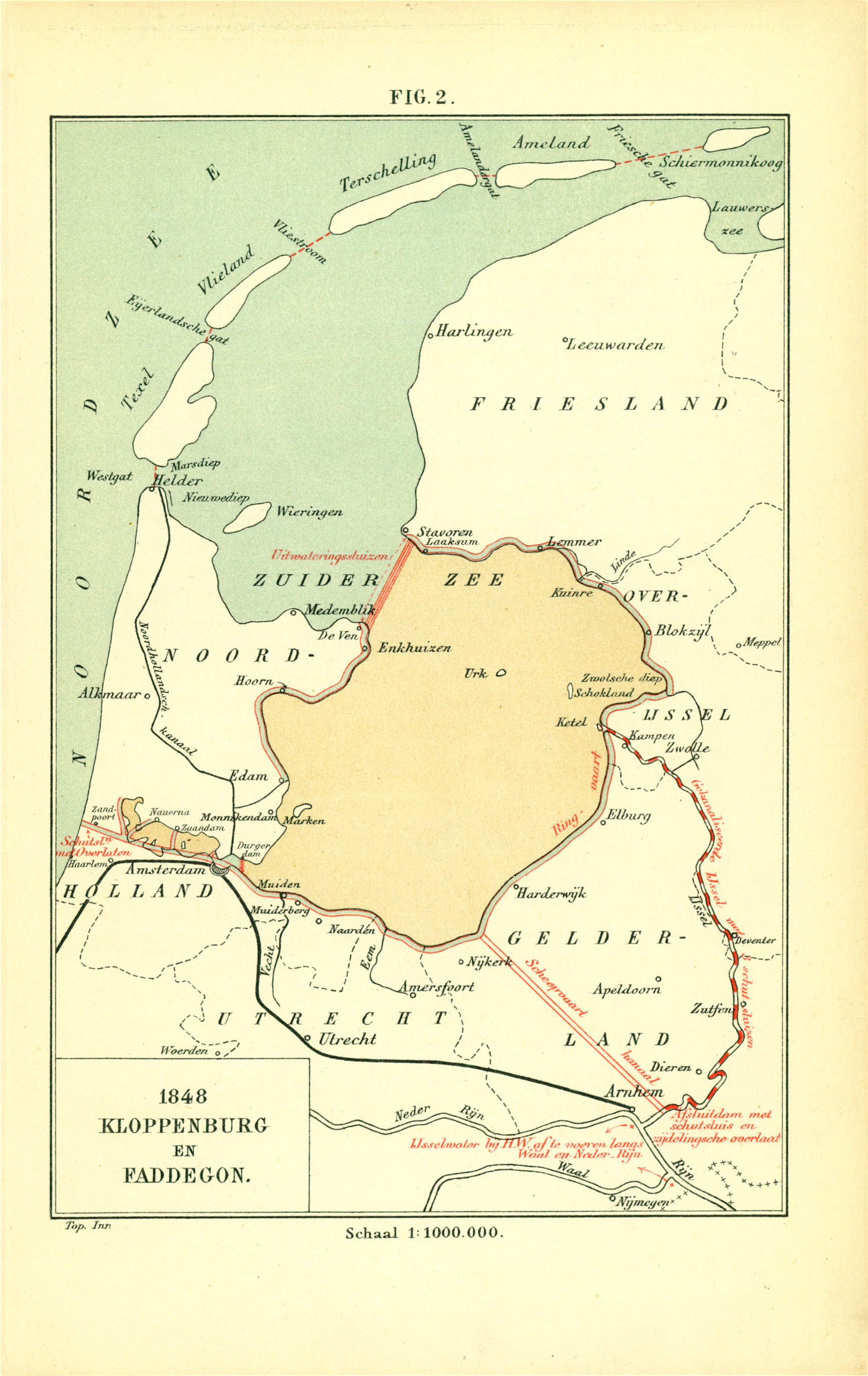
Plan Kloppenburg en Faggedon
(1848)

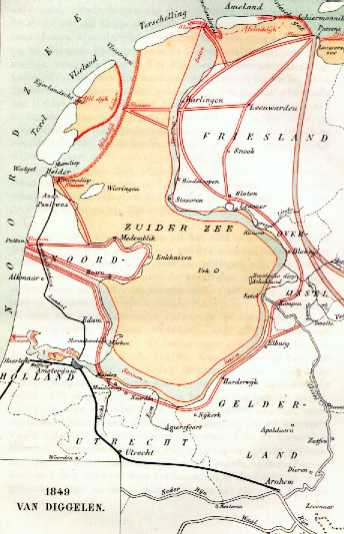
Plan Van Diggelen
(1849)

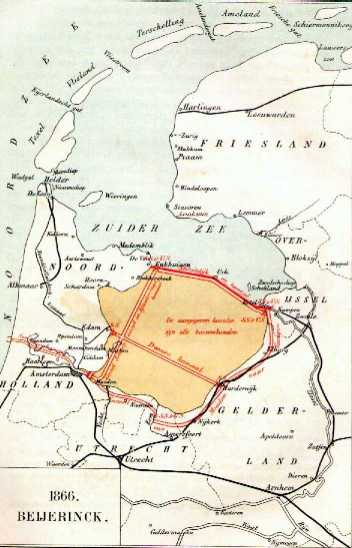
Plan Beyerinck
(1866)

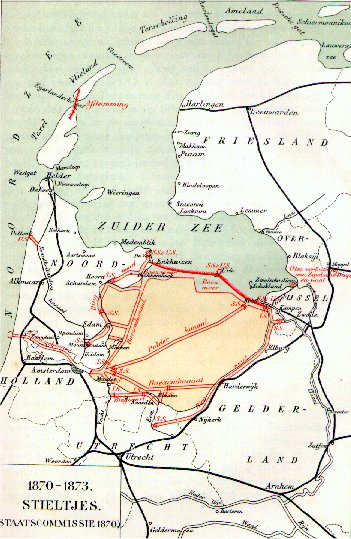
Plan Stieltjes
(1870–1873)

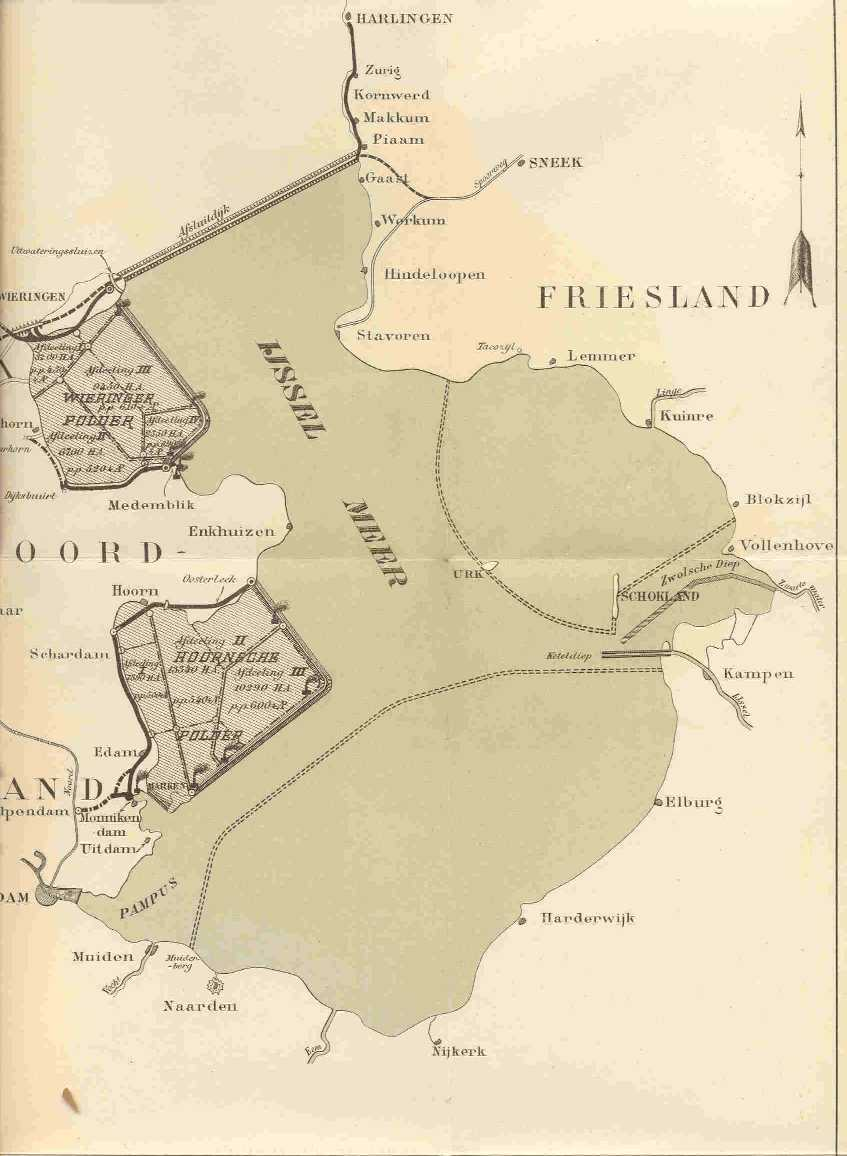
Original Plan Lely
(date unknown)

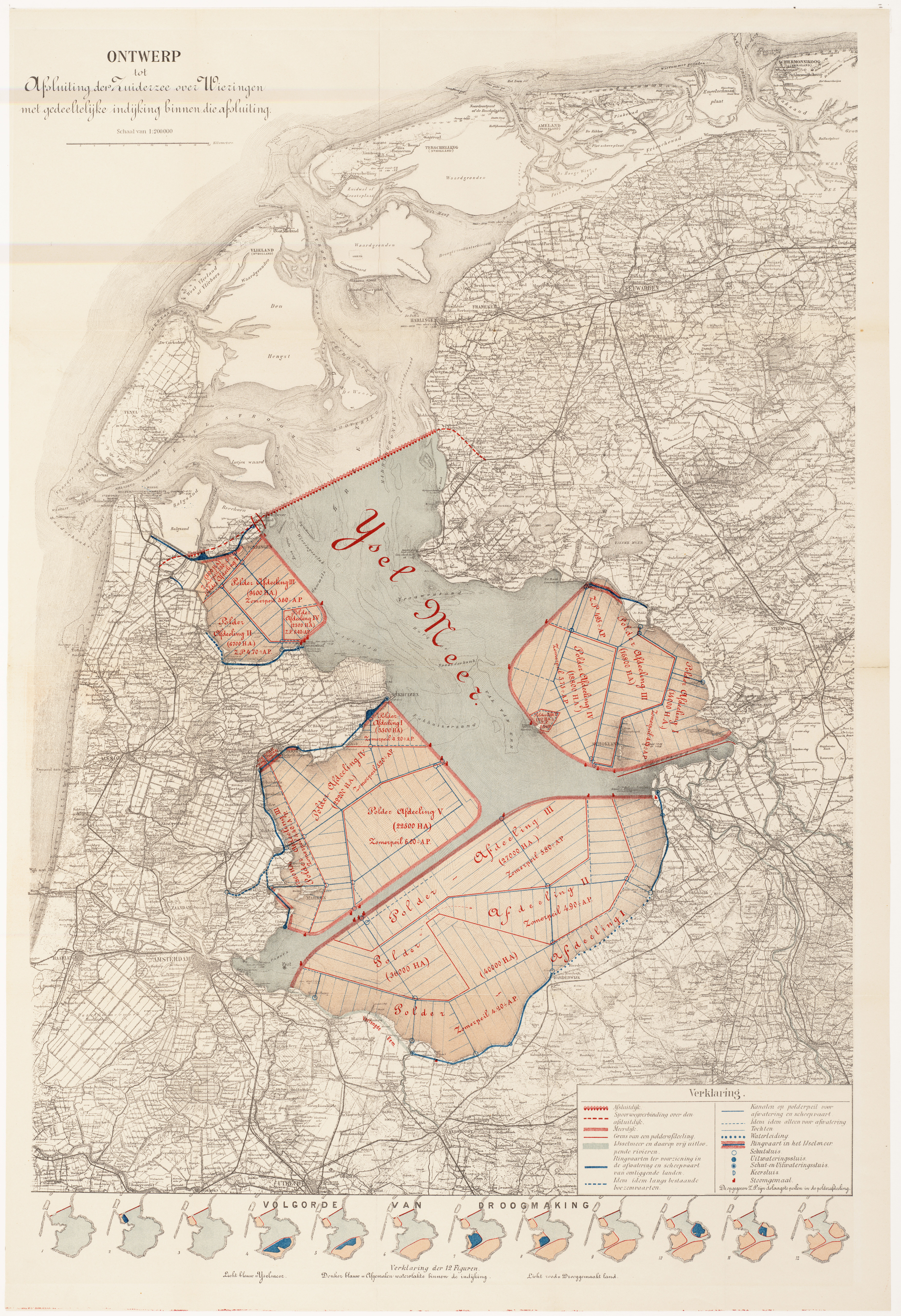
Plan Lely
(1891)

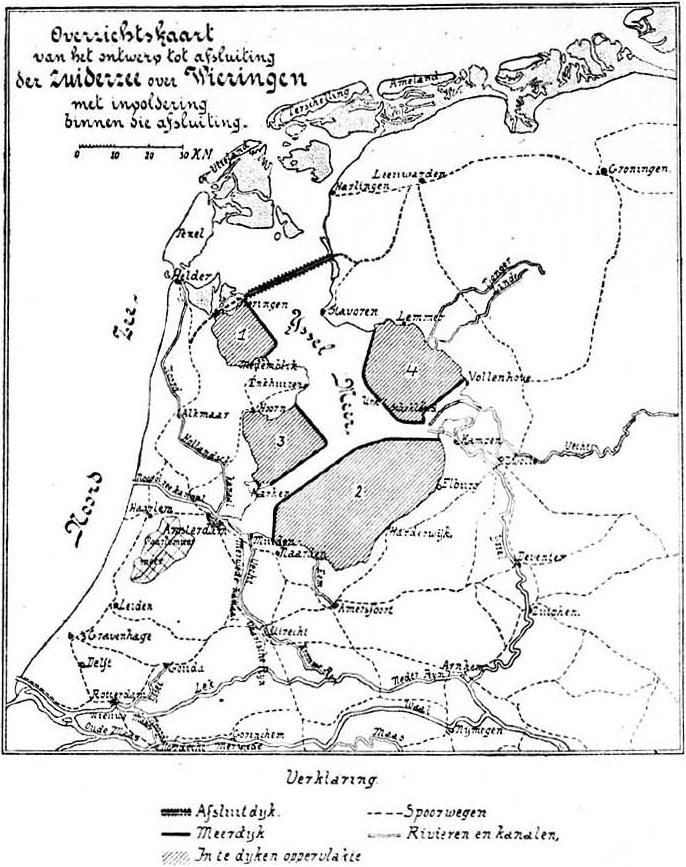
Plan Zuiderzeewerken
(1907)

== Criticism ==
In 1971, the dutch artist Joseph Beuys created the performance-work Bog action in order to criticize the Zuiderzee Works, in particular the draining and exploitation of peatland. For this art work, the artist immersed himself in the water.

== See also ==
- Delta Works for another major waterworks project in the Netherlands.
- Lauwerszee Works
- Flood control in the Netherlands
- Flood
- Zuiderzeemuseum
