= Andijk =

- Village
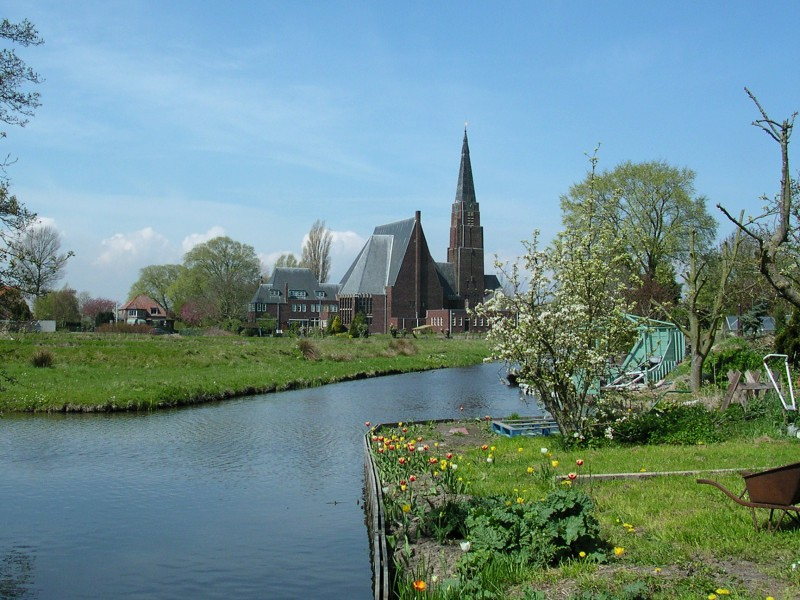
- Church of Andijk

- Flag Coat of arms

- Location in the Netherlands Location in the province of North Holland in the Netherlands
- Coordinates: 52.75°N 5.22°E
- Country: Netherlands
- Province: North Holland
- Municipality: Medemblik

Area
  - Village: 22.85 km^{2} (8.82 sq mi)
- Elevation: −1.3 m (−4.3 ft)

Population (2025)
  - Village: 7,235
  - Density: 316.6/km^{2} (820.1/sq mi)
  - Urban: 6,690
  - Rural: 545
- Time zone: UTC+1 (CET)
  - Summer (DST): UTC+2 (CEST)
- Postal code: 1619
- Dialing code: 0228

Andijk (Dutch: [ɑnˈdɛik]; West Frisian: Andìk) is a former municipality and a village bordering Lake IJssel in the Netherlands, in the province of North Holland and the region of West-Frisia. Since 1 January 2011 Andijk has been part of Medemblik municipality.

The name Andijk comes from the Dutch: aan de dijk, lit. 'at the dike'. In 1667 a small church was built. During the Napoleonic occupation, Andijk became an independent municipality on 1 January 1812 by imperial decree of 21 October 1811.

Andijk has fertile clay soil used for agriculture and vegetable horticulture and is also an important supplier of drinking water for the region.

== Local government ==
The last municipal council of Andijk had 13 seats, which at the 2006 election were divided as follows:

- CDA – 4 seats
- PvdA – 3 seats
- VVD – 3 seats
- GroenLinks – 2 seats
- ChristenUnie – 1 seat

An election was held in November 2010 for a council for the new merged Medemblik municipality that commenced work in January 2011, replacing Andijk council.

== Public transport ==
Bus service 132 operates hourly through Andijk at roughly xx.30 each hour during the day. It connects to Hoorn NS railway station.

== Test polder ==
The Pilot Polder Andijk, of 40 hectares (99 acres), was built in 1926 and 1927 as a test-bed for the construction of the Wieringermeer polder. Reclaimed from the Zuiderzee, the polder is now mainly used for recreation, including holiday homes, a camp-site and a beach. This polder is cited in the town's anthem.

== News ==
De Andijker has been the local newspaper since 1921, and can also be read on the Internet. It includes daily news and (historical) photos of the village.

== Notable people ==
- Bep Vriend, international bridge player, born 1946 in Andijk
