= Pilot Polder Andijk =

Coordinates: 52°45′05″N 5°11′43″E

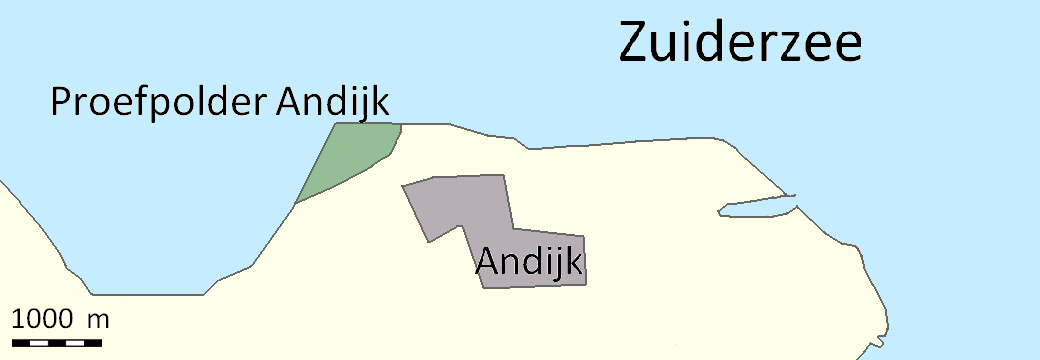
The pilot Polder Andijk in green

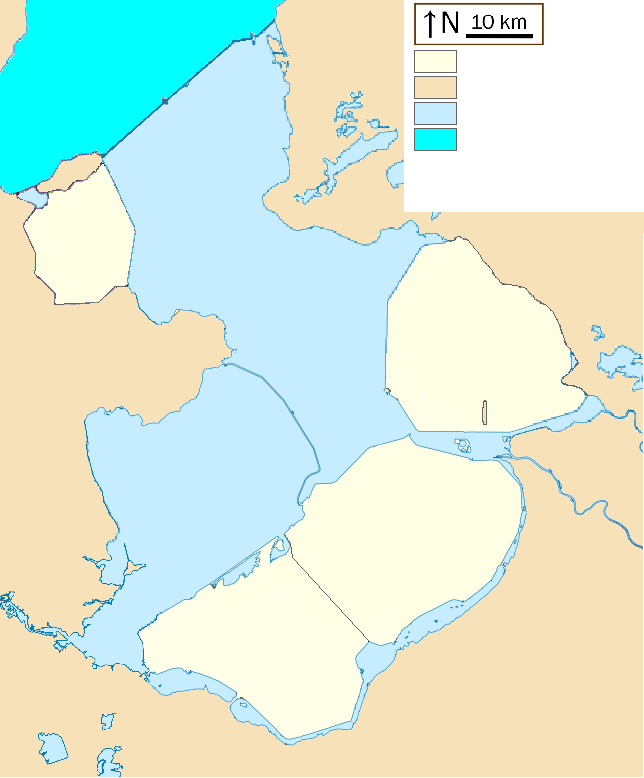
Zuiderzee works

The pilot Polder Andijk, or Test Polder Andijk, Proefpolder Andijk in Dutch, is a polder established in 1926 - 1927 in the Zuiderzee near the village of Andijk. The aim of this prototype was to study the embankments and agriculture for future polders in the Zuiderzee Works. In 1929, the pilot polder was inaugurated by Queen Wilhelmina of the Netherlands.

== Construction ==
In 1924 the Lovink Committee – headed by Hermanus Johannes Lovink – published a proposal to build a pilot polder. This polder could, on a small scale experiment future agriculture. The knowledge would then be used for the Wieringermeer. For this reason, in 1926-1927 near the village Andijk, 40 hectares (99 acres) of land were reclaimed. On August 27, 1927, the pilot polder was drained. The cost of the polder, about 1 million guilders, was relatively high, but the cost of polders to come should be lower.

== Research ==
The Directorate of Wieringermeer wanted to study the behavior of a soil recovered from the sea, and how saline soils can be cultivated. After the draining was completed, a farm was built as well as laboratories for agriculture, soil science and research in microbiology. Different aspects for optimal use of land have been studied, such as desalination, drying and compacting. Experiments were also made to know the best way to cultivate and to select suitable crops. Some species can concentrate the salt and prepare future plantations.

== Results ==
By 1929 the polder was dry. Rain normally washes salt from reclaimed land in six or seven years; to make the soil useful faster, gypsum was added to the soil with different fertilizers in various parts of the experimental farm. The land became an ordinary farm on 1 November 1935 after tests showed that the polder could be cultivated. With the experience gained in the pilot, development of the polder Wieringermeer was accelerated.

== Later use ==
In the late twentieth century the polder became a site for holiday homes.
