= Kreileroord =

- Village
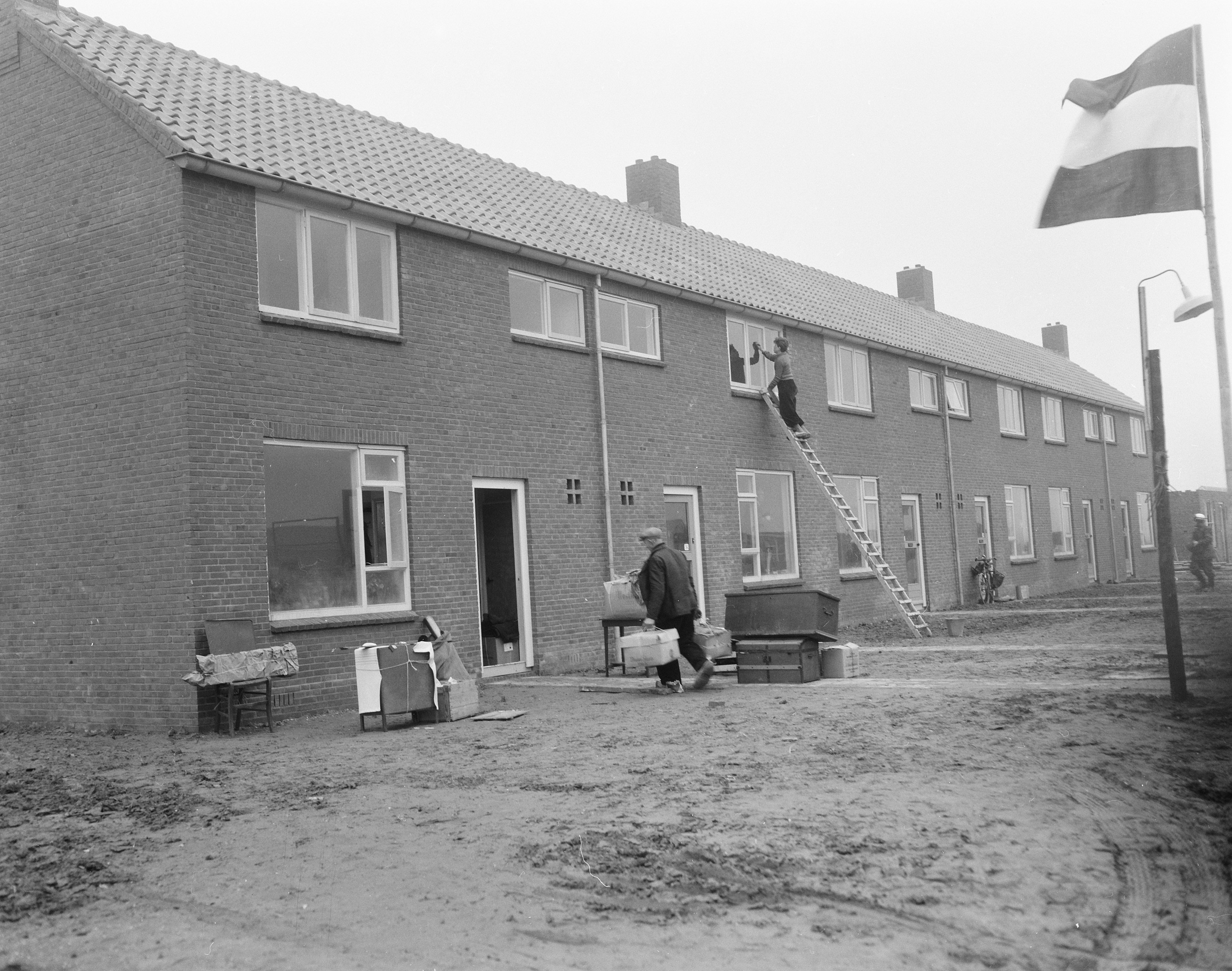
- Inhabitants arrive in the new village (1957)

- Location in the Netherlands Location in the province of North Holland in the Netherlands
- Coordinates: 52°50′32″N 5°4′53″E
- Country: Netherlands
- Province: North Holland
- Municipality: Hollands Kroon
- Established: 1957

Area
  - Total: 0.19 km^{2} (0.073 sq mi)
- Elevation: −4.0 m (−13.1 ft)

Population (2025)
  - Total: 590
  - Density: 3,100/km^{2} (8,000/sq mi)
- Time zone: UTC+1 (CET)
  - Summer (DST): UTC+2 (CEST)
- Postal code: 1773
- Dialing code: 0227

Kreileroord is a village in the Dutch province of North Holland. It is a part of the municipality of Hollands Kroon, and lies about 21 km north of Hoorn.

The settlement started around 1930 as Dorp IV (village IV). In the 1950s, the current name was selected. It refers to a peat excavation are on the former island of Creil in the former Zuiderzee. See also: the village Creil in the Noordoostpolder. The village was officially founded in 1957 for farm workers.
