= Rijkswaterstaat =

Dutch water management agency

- Rijkswaterstaat
- National logo of the government of the Netherlands

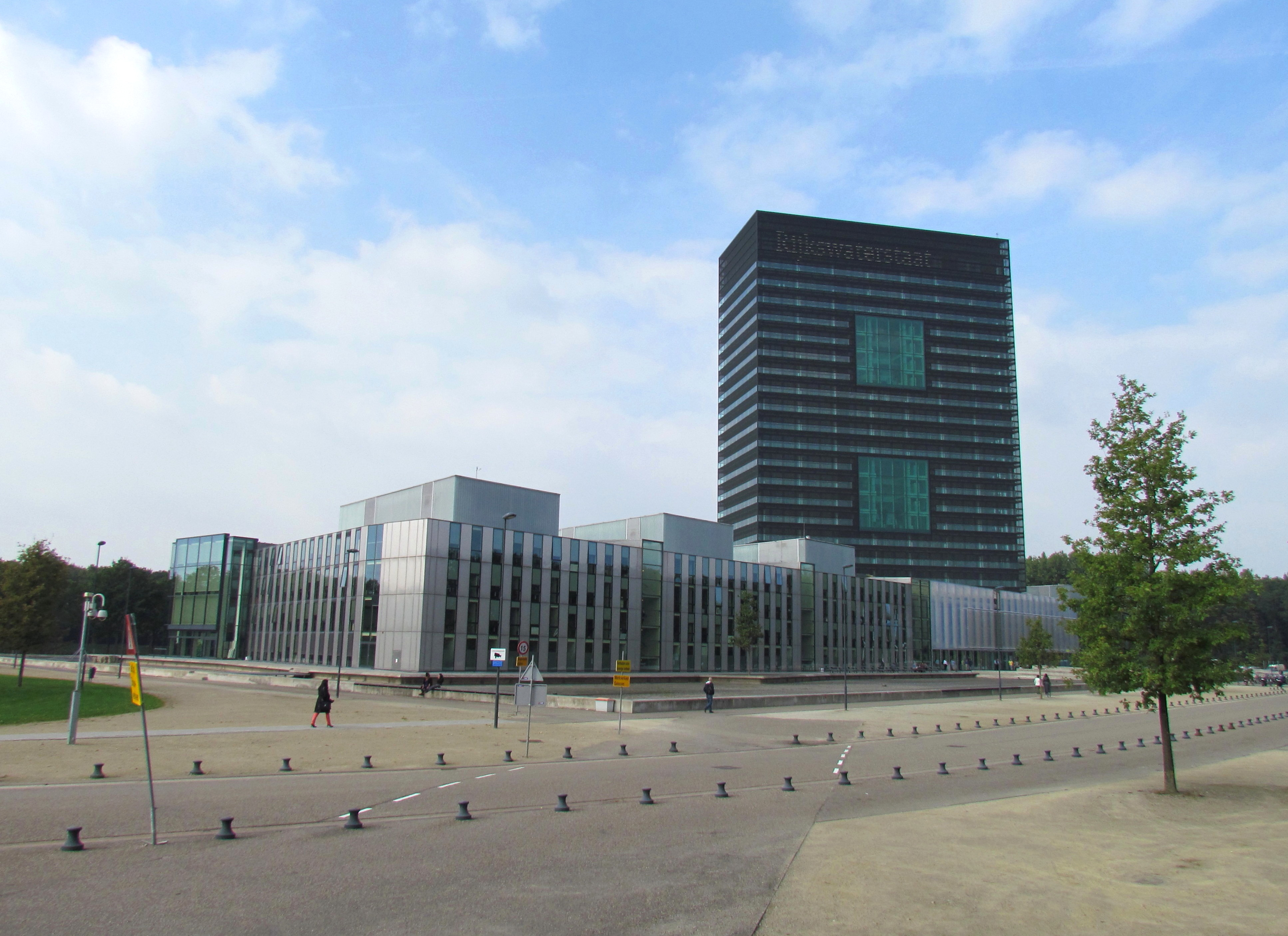
- Rijkswaterstaat headquarters in Utrecht.

National agency overview
- Formed: 1798
- Jurisdiction: Government of the Netherlands
- Headquarters: Utrecht, the Netherlands
- Motto: Water, wegen, werken. Rijkswaterstaat (water, roads, works. Rijkswaterstaat)
- Employees: 5001-10000
- Annual budget: € 5,000,000,000
- Minister responsible: Robert Tieman, Minister of Infrastructure and Water Management
- National agency executives: Martin Wijnen, Director-General; Patricia Zorko, Deputy Director-General; Sylvia Bijl, Chief Financial Officer; Erica Slump, Chief Engineer-Director Traffic and Water Management; Bob Demoet, Chief Engineer-Director Programs, Projects and Maintenance; Louis Schouwstra, Chief Operational Officer; Ron Kolkman, Chief Information Officer
- Parent department: Ministry of Infrastructure and Water Management
- Website: rijkswaterstaat.nl

Rijkswaterstaat, founded in 1798 as the Bureau voor den Waterstaat and formerly translated to Directorate General for Public Works and Water Management, is a Directorate-General of the Ministry of Infrastructure and Water Management of the Netherlands. Its role is the practical execution of the public works and water management, including the construction and maintenance of waterways and roads, and flood protection and prevention. The agency was also involved in the construction of big railway projects such as the Betuweroute and the HSL-Zuid.

The mission statement of the organisation reads: "Rijkswaterstaat is de rijksdienst die werkt aan droge voeten, schoon en voldoende water én aan de vlotte en veilige doorstroming van het verkeer" (Rijkswaterstaat is the national agency that provides dry feet, clean and sufficient water and a quick and safe flow of traffic). The agency is divided in 10 regional, 6 specialist services and 2 special services.

The current director-general of Rijkswaterstaat is Martin Wijnen, who assumed office on 1 January 2024. Since 1 January 2006, Rijkswaterstaat has been an (executive) agentschap (agency).

== Name ==
The Dutch word waterstaat denotes the condition of an area in relation to the level and the condition of surface and groundwater, including all relevant natural and artificial features. The component 'rijks' translates as 'national'.

== Organization structure ==
Rijkswaterstaat is divided into regional and specialist services, formerly known as directies. Each service is managed by a hoofdingenieur-directeur (HID), who together form the board of Rijkswaterstaat.

=== Regional services ===
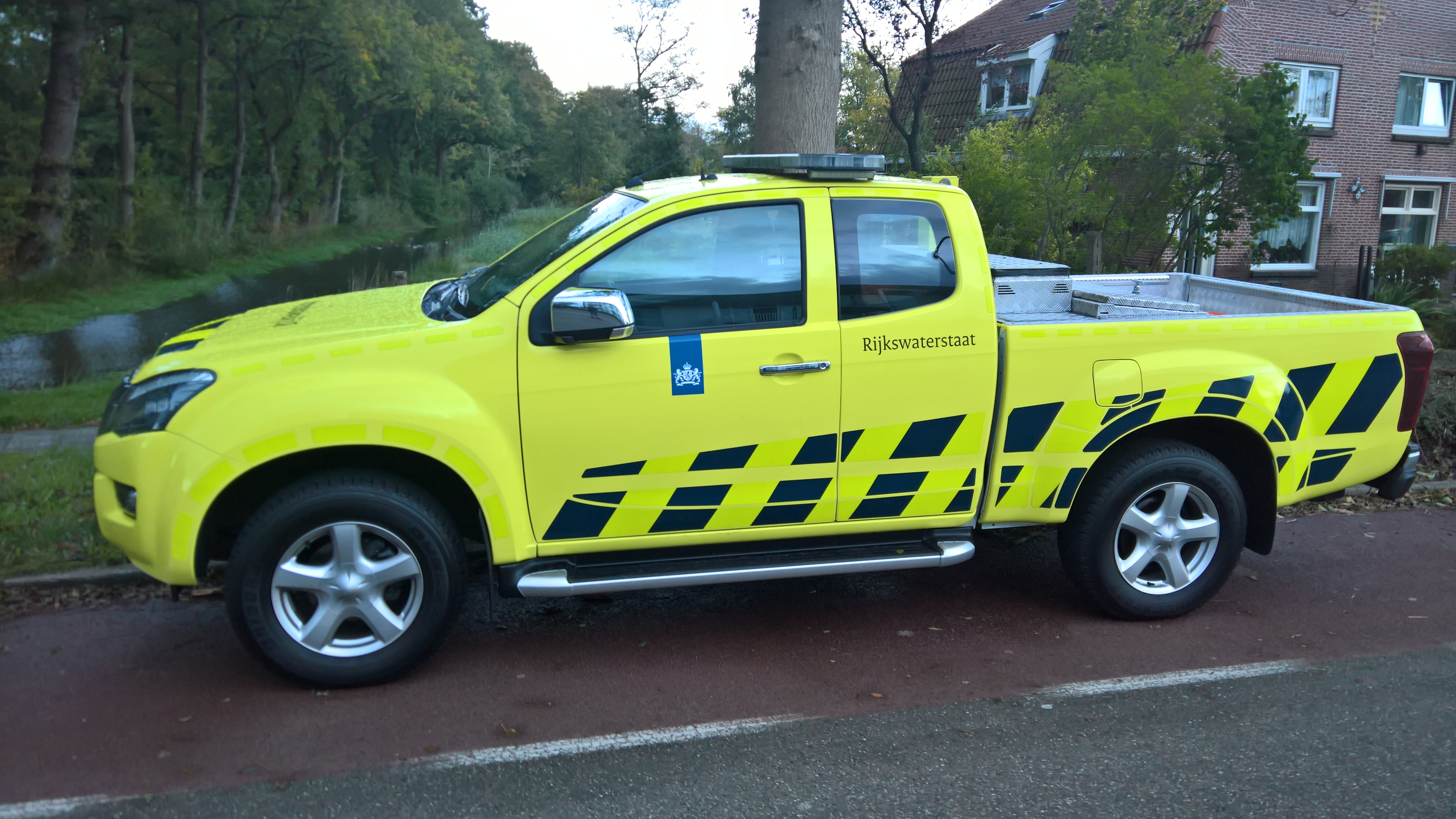
Vehicle of a road inspector

The regions are divided in local water- en wegendistricten (water and road districts), formerly known as dienstkringen. In the past, every province had its own regional organisation, but the directies Groningen, Friesland and Drenthe were merged, forming the service Noord-Nederland, the directies Overijssel and Gelderland were merged to form the service Oost-Nederland, the directies IJsselmeergebied and Utrecht were merged to form the service Midden-Nederland and the directies Noord-Brabant and Limburg were merged to form the service Zuid-Nederland. The following regional services exist:

- RWS Noord-Nederland, RWS NN (located in Leeuwarden)
- RWS West Nederland Noord, RWS WNN (located in Haarlem)
- RWS Midden-Nederland, RWS MN (located in Utrecht and Lelystad)
- RWS Oost-Nederland, RWS ON (located in Arnhem)
- RWS West Nederland Zuid, RWS WNZ (located in Rotterdam)
- RWS Zee en Delta, RWS ZD (located in Middelburg and Rijswijk)
- RWS Zuid-Nederland, RWS ZN (located in 's-Hertogenbosch and Maastricht)

=== Specialist Services ===
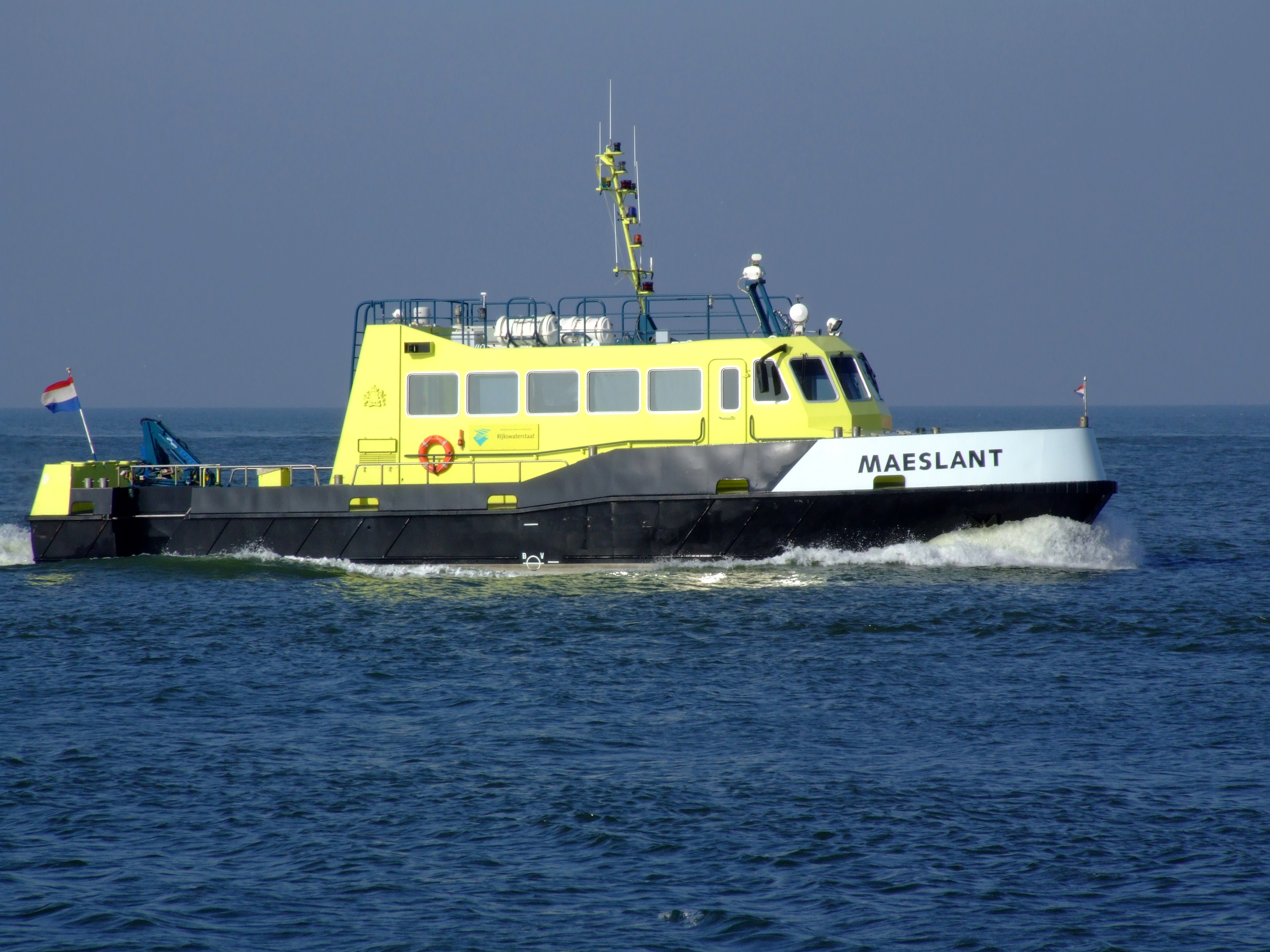
The vessel Maeslant, of Rijkswaterstaat

- RWS Water, Traffic and Environment, RWS WVL (located in Utrecht, Rijswijk and Lelystad)
- RWS Programmes, Projects and Maintenance, RWS PPO (located in Utrecht)
- RWS Major Projects and Maintenance, RWS GPO (located in Utrecht)
- RWS Traffic- and Water Management, RWS VWM (located in Utrecht, Rotterdam and Lelystad)
- RWS Central Information Services, RWS CIV (located in Delft)
- RWS Centre for Corporate services, RWS CD (located in Utrecht)
- Government Shipping Department (located in Rijswijk)

== Project Directorates (Special Services) ==
- Room for the River 2.0, RWS RVR2 (located in Utrecht)

=== Former (specialist) services ===
- Projectdirectie Maaswerken, Tomorrow's Meuse (located in Maastricht and Roermond). 2003 - 2010
- Projectdirectie HSL-Zuid, High Speed Line South (located in Zoetermeer). 2001 - 2009
- Waterstaatskerken
- Deltadienst
- Rijksdienst voor de IJsselmeerpolders, National Institute for polders in the IJsselmeer
- Rijksinstituut voor Kust en Zee, National Institute for the Coast and Sea (located in The Hague)
- Rijksinstituut voor Integraal Zoetwaterbeheer en Afvalwaterbehandeling, National Institute for integral Fresh Water management and Waste Treatment (located in Lelystad)
- Dienst voor Weg en Waterbouwkunde, Service for Road- and Waterarchitecture (located in Delft)
- Adviesdienst Verkeer en Vervoer, Advisory service Traffic and Transport (located in Rotterdam)
- Room for the River, RWS RVR (located in Utrecht)

== Notable employees ==
- Elze van den Ban
