= Middenmeer =

- Village
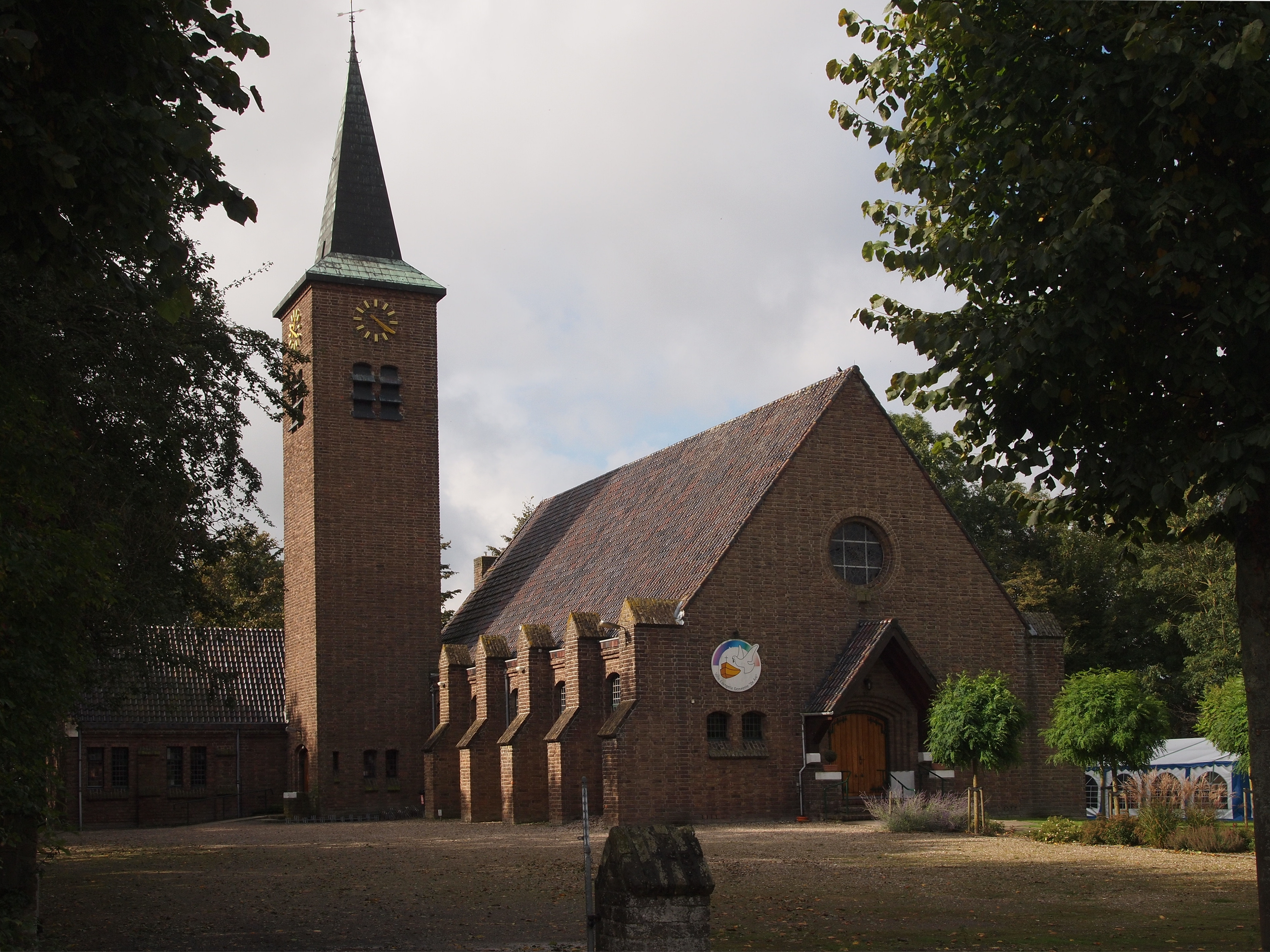
- Dutch Reformed church

- Location in the Netherlands Location in the province of North Holland in the Netherlands
- Coordinates: 52°48′31″N 4°59′54″E
- Country: Netherlands
- Province: North Holland
- Municipality: Hollands Kroon

Area
  - Village: 70.76 km^{2} (27.32 sq mi)
- Elevation: −3.5 m (−11 ft)

Population (2025)
  - Village: 4,590
  - Density: 64.9/km^{2} (168/sq mi)
  - Urban: 3,935
  - Rural: 655
- Time zone: UTC+1 (CET)
  - Summer (DST): UTC+2 (CEST)
- Postal code: 1775
- Dialing code: 0227

Middenmeer is a village in the Dutch province of North Holland. It is part of the municipality of Hollands Kroon, and lies about 23 km north of Hoorn.

Middenmeer was established in 1932 under the name of Sluis III. Nearby the village was a military airfield Middenmeer in WO II used by the 1e Verkenningsgroep (1st Reconnaissance Group) of the Royal Netherlands Air Force. Now Middenmeer has an airfield for light and ultra light airplanes, Middenmeer Aerodrome.

On 1 July 1941, the Wieringermeer became a municipality, with ir. S. Smeding as its first mayor.

On 17 April 1945, the dikes of the Wieringermeer polder were blown up by the German occupying forces and the Wieringermeer was inundated. Middenmeer as well as neighboring villages had to be evacuated.

On 11 December 1945 the polder was dry again.

== Moedermavo ==
In 1975 the first Moedermavo (English: School for mothers) of the Netherlands was started in Middenmeer. The moedermavo was an initiative of Anton Remmers, director of the local school, the Ariënsmavo. The school was a MAVO, a Dutch secondary school, aimed at adult women wanting to finish their education. At the time there were many women who had not received education after primary school or 'huishoudschool' (English: housekeeping school). In the first year 130 women would attend. Adult students would mingle with teenaged students in between classes, but received classes separately. At the time, the moedermavo was considered a novel and revolutionary idea, but it proved successful. Within a year and a half there were already 41 moedermavos spread across The Netherlands.

== People ==
Sicco Mansholt was mayor in 1945 for some weeks.

In 2001, the town of Middenmeer had 2805 inhabitants. The built-up area of the town was 0.82 km^{2}, and contained 1193 residences. The wider statistical area of Middenmeer has a population of around 3210.

== Industry ==
Microsoft built a major datacenter in the Wieringermeer polder near Middenmeer. The site was targeted by anti-genocide protesters in 2025.
