= List of lakes of the Netherlands =

The Netherlands Environmental Assessment Agency published a map of surface water bodies in the Netherlands in 2010. The map distinguishes over 20 different types of water bodies, including those with salty, brackish and fresh water. These water bodies encompass natural and artificial lakes of varying sizes, peat puddles and fens. The total combined surface area of the lakes larger than 50 hectares (120 acres) is 2,500 square kilometres (970 sq mi). While a comprehensive list of past and present lakes in the Netherlands is not available, selected lists can be found.

== Groups of lakes ==
Within the Netherlands, there are several groups of lakes or lake systems that are often referred to as a whole. Examples include:

- Frisian Lakes, a group of 24 lakes located in the province of Friesland
- Bordering lakes, a body of water surrounding the Flevopolder often divided into ten parts or lakes

== Lakes ==
The following is a list of lakes of the Netherlands.

Name	Part of	Province	Area	
Name	Part of	Province	km^{2}	sq mi
Brielse Meer		South Holland	4	1.5
Gooimeer	Bordering Lakes	North Holland / Flevoland	26.7	10.3
Veerse Meer		Zeeland	25.4	9.8
IJsselmeer		Flevoland / Friesland / North-Holland	1,133.0	437.5
Veluwemeer	Bordering Lakes	Flevoland / Gelderland	32.5	12.5
Zuidlaardermeer		Drenthe / Groningen	20.8	8.0
Grevelingen		South Holland / Zeeland	137.5	53.1
Markermeer, including IJmeer		Flevoland / North Holland	684.6	264.3
Kagerplassen		South Holland	3.4	1.3
Ketelmeer	Bordering Lakes	Flevoland / Overijssel	35	14
Lauwersmeer		Friesland / Groningen	57.6	22.2
Blauwe Meer		Drenthe	0.2	0.077
Eemmeer	Bordering Lakes	Flevoland / North Holland / Utrecht	13.4	5.2
Burgumer Mar		Friesland	0.4	0.15
Gaasperplas		North Holland	1.7	0.66
Haringvliet		South Holland	112	43
Hofvijver		South Holland	0.02	0.0077
Kralingse Plas		South Holland	1	0.39
Weerwater		Flevoland	1.7	0.66
Veerplas		North Holland	0.2	0.077
Westeinder plassen		North Holland	10	3.9
Wolderwijd	Bordering Lakes	Flevoland / Gelderland	18	6.9
Kortenhoefse plassen		North Holland	0.36	0.14
Oldambtmeer		Groningen	0.8	0.31
Drontermeer	Bordering Lakes	Flevoland / Gelderland	4.76	1.8

== Ancient lakes ==
The waterscape of the Netherlands undergoes continuous change. The following is a list of historical lakes in the Netherlands:

- Haarlemmermeer
- Lake Almere
- Lake Flevo
- Purmer
