= Flevopolder =

Island polder in Flevoland, the Netherlands

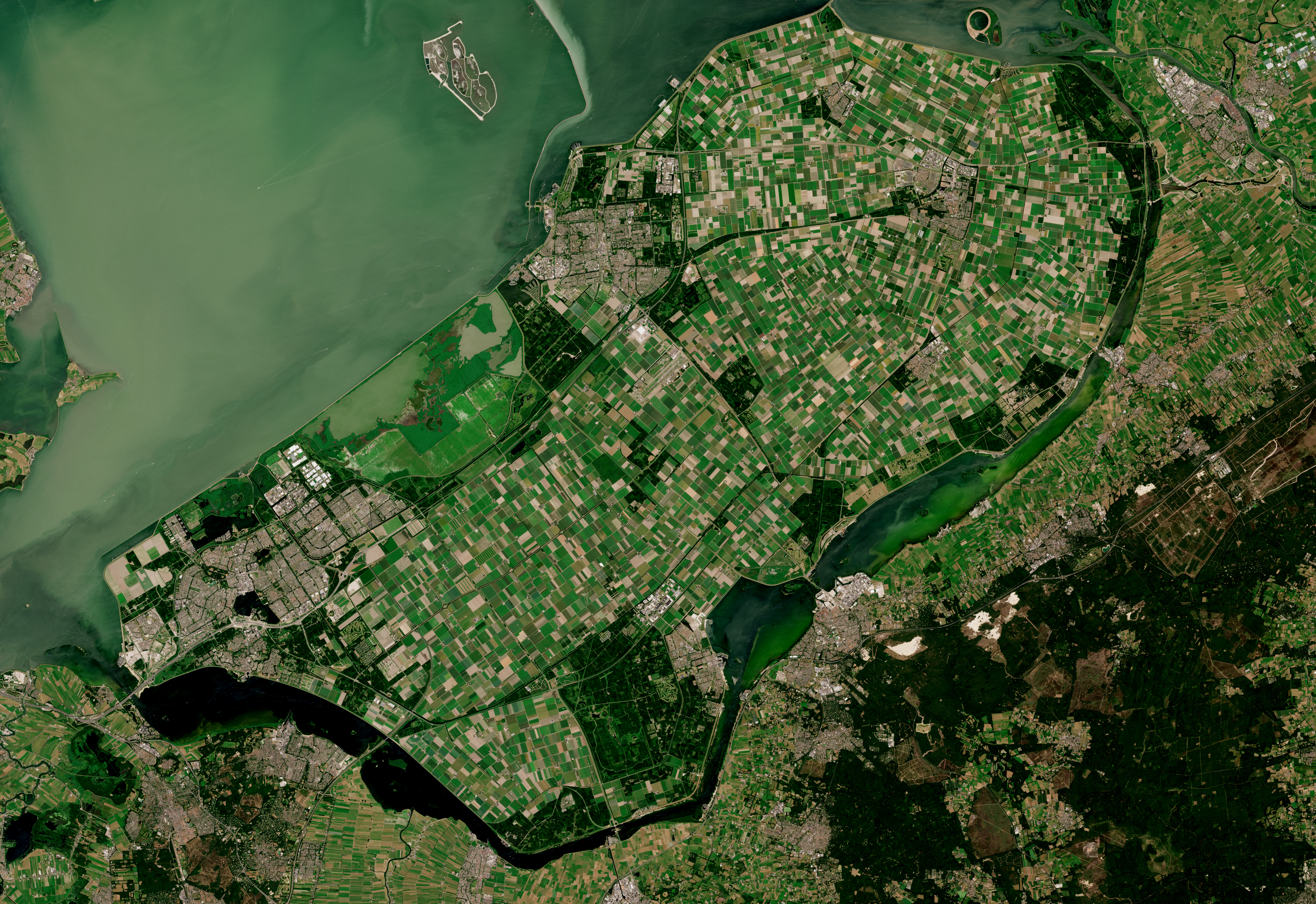
- The Flevopolder
- Interactive map of Flevopolder

Geography
- Location: Flevoland
- Coordinates: 52°27′N 5°30′E
- Area: 970 km^{2} (370 sq mi)

Administration
- Netherlands
- Largest settlement: Almere (pop. 202,764)

Demographics
- Population: 317,000

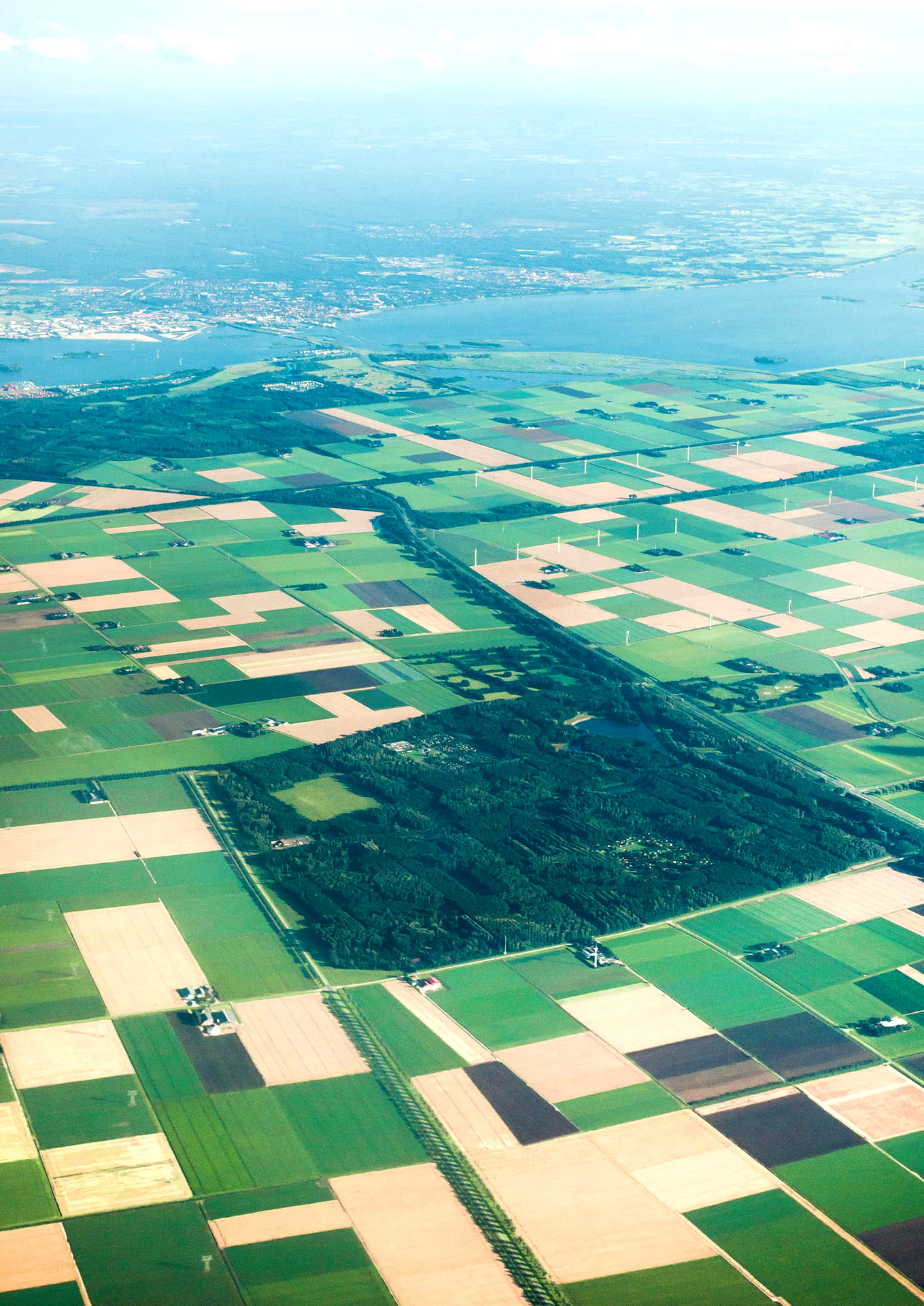
Aerial view of Flevopolder

The Flevopolder is an island polder in Flevoland, a province of the Netherlands. Created by land reclamation, its northeastern part was drained in 1955 and the remainder—the southwest—in 1968.

Unlike other major polders, the Flevopolder is surrounded by lakes and below-sea-level channels. By some definitions, it is the world's largest artificial island. (Note: René-Levasseur Island in the Canadian province of Quebec is considerably larger than the Flevopolder. However, this island was a natural landform that became an island after the completion of the Daniel-Johnson dam in the late 1960s created Manicouagan Reservoir.)

== Background ==
The Flevopolder was created as part of the Zuiderzeewerken, a hydraulic engineering project designed to separate the Zuiderzee from the North Sea and lower its water level, enabling the reclamation of land within the newly formed lake. Flevopolder was the most recent major area reclaimed from the Zuiderzee, following the Wieringermeerpolder to the north and the Noordoostpolder to the east.

The Flevopolder was constructed in two stages. The polder that now forms the northeast half of the island was completed in 1957, followed by a second polder for the southwest half in 1968. Levees and dikes were first built around the region, after which the internal water was drained by diesel and electric pumps. Unlike the other polders constructed during the project, the Flevopolder was left entirely surrounded by water, as the experience of building the earlier polders had demonstrated that it was the best way to avoid subsidence in the adjacent mainland.

== Geography ==
The Flevopolder together with the Noordoostpolder forms the province of Flevoland, the most recent province to be added to the Netherlands. Its southwestern point is close to Amsterdam and its opposite end is close to Kampen, Overijssel. To the north are two freshwater lakes, IJsselmeer and Markermeer. The Flevopolder has numerous bordering lakes to the south and east, including IJmeer, Veluwemeer, Ketelmeer, and Gooimeer.

The most populated city on the island is Almere, followed by Lelystad. Other population centers include Zeewolde, Biddinghuizen, Dronten and Swifterbant.

Biddinghuizen is known for the Walibi theme park. Lelystad is named for Cornelis Lely, a Dutch politician and one of the early planners of the land reclamation project. The Oostvaardersplassen is a Nature Reserve where birds and other animals reside.

Almere and Lelystad count for more than 70% of the population. The polder consists of Four Municipalities; Lelystad, Almere, Dronten and Zeewolde (Swifterbant and Biddinghuizen are both part of the Dronten Municipality).

Almere and Lelystad are major cities and are part of the Amsterdam Metropolitan Area. They are used to house refugees to limit overpopulation.

=== Urban Area ===
While most people reside in the major city of Almere, the capital of Flevoland is Lelystad. Dronten is the third most populous city in the Flevopolder with Zeewolde, Biddinghuizen and Swifterbant being less populated.

Almere Stad, Almere Pampus, Almere Haven, Almere Poort, Almere Buiten and Almere Hout are the 6 districts, with Almere Muziekwijk and Overgooi debated if they are districts or not.

== Etymology ==
The polder's name refers to the ancient Lake Flevo.
