= Lighthouse Island =

Lighthouse Island may refer to:

- Lighthouse Island (Northern Ireland), in the Copeland Islands
- Vuurtoreneiland ("Lighthouse Island"), Netherlands
- Lighthouse Island (Lake Superior), location of Huron Island Light, Michigan, US
