= Hollandse Brug =

Bridge crossing Gooimeer and IJmeer, the Netherlands

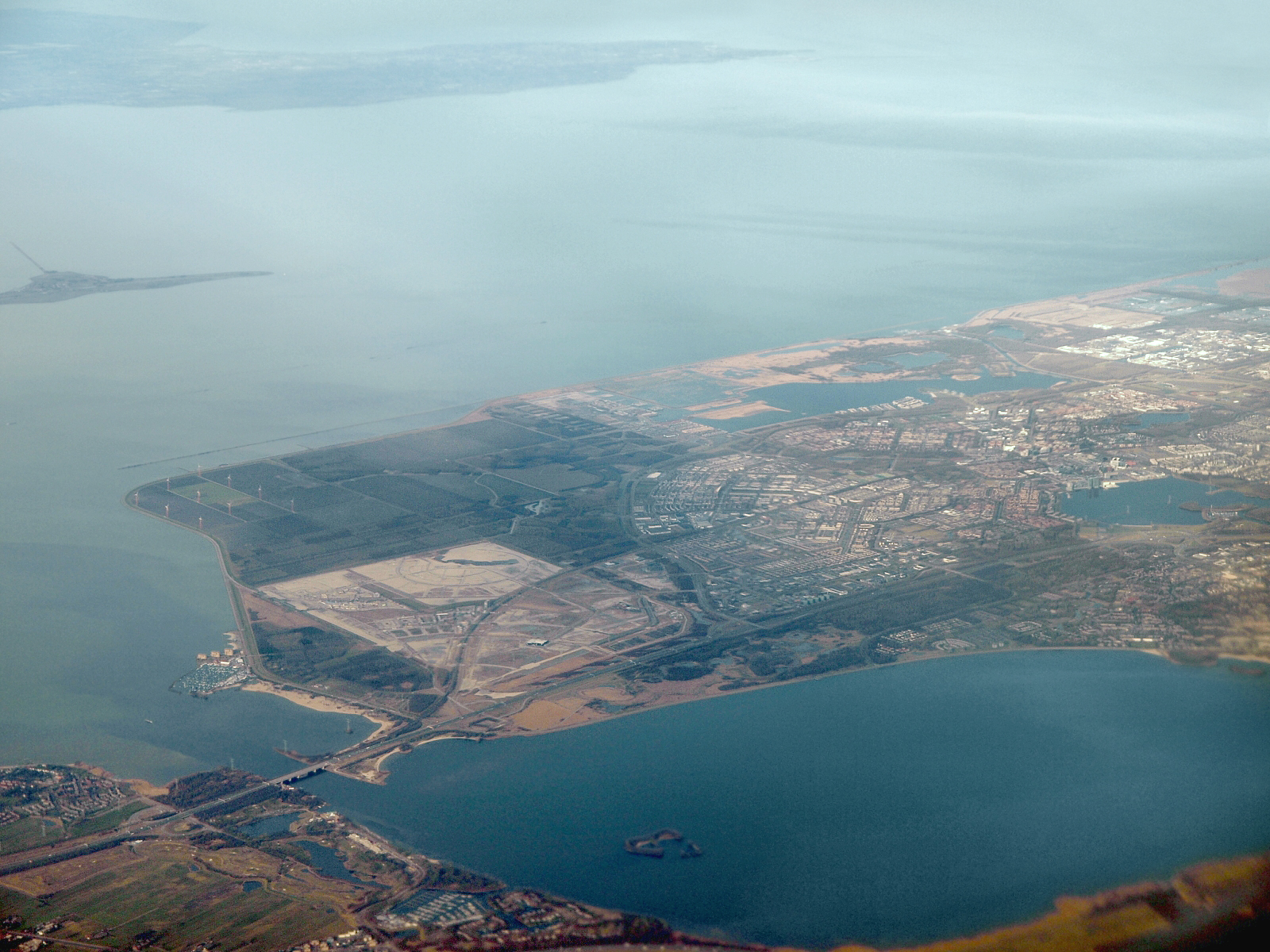
- Southeastern Flevoland as viewed from the air. The Hollandse Brug can be seen in the lower left.
- Coordinates: 52°19′32″N 5°08′20″E
- Carries: A6, Flevolijn
- Crosses: Gooimeer and IJmeer
- Locale: Netherlands

History
- Opened: 1969

The Hollandse Brug is a bridge structure that crosses the Gooimeer and the IJmeer in the Netherlands. The bridge carries both the Flevolijn heavy rail railway and the A6 motorway, plus a cycleway and footway.

== History and importance ==
The bridge opened on June 4, 1969 and, since then, has been the main link between the Randstad (the conurbanation including Amsterdam, The Hague and Rotterdam) and the province of Flevoland, including its two largest cities Almere and Lelystad. In 1987, the bridge carrying the Flevolijn railway between Weesp and Almere Buiten was opened adjacent to the Hollandse Brug.
