= Wolderwijd =

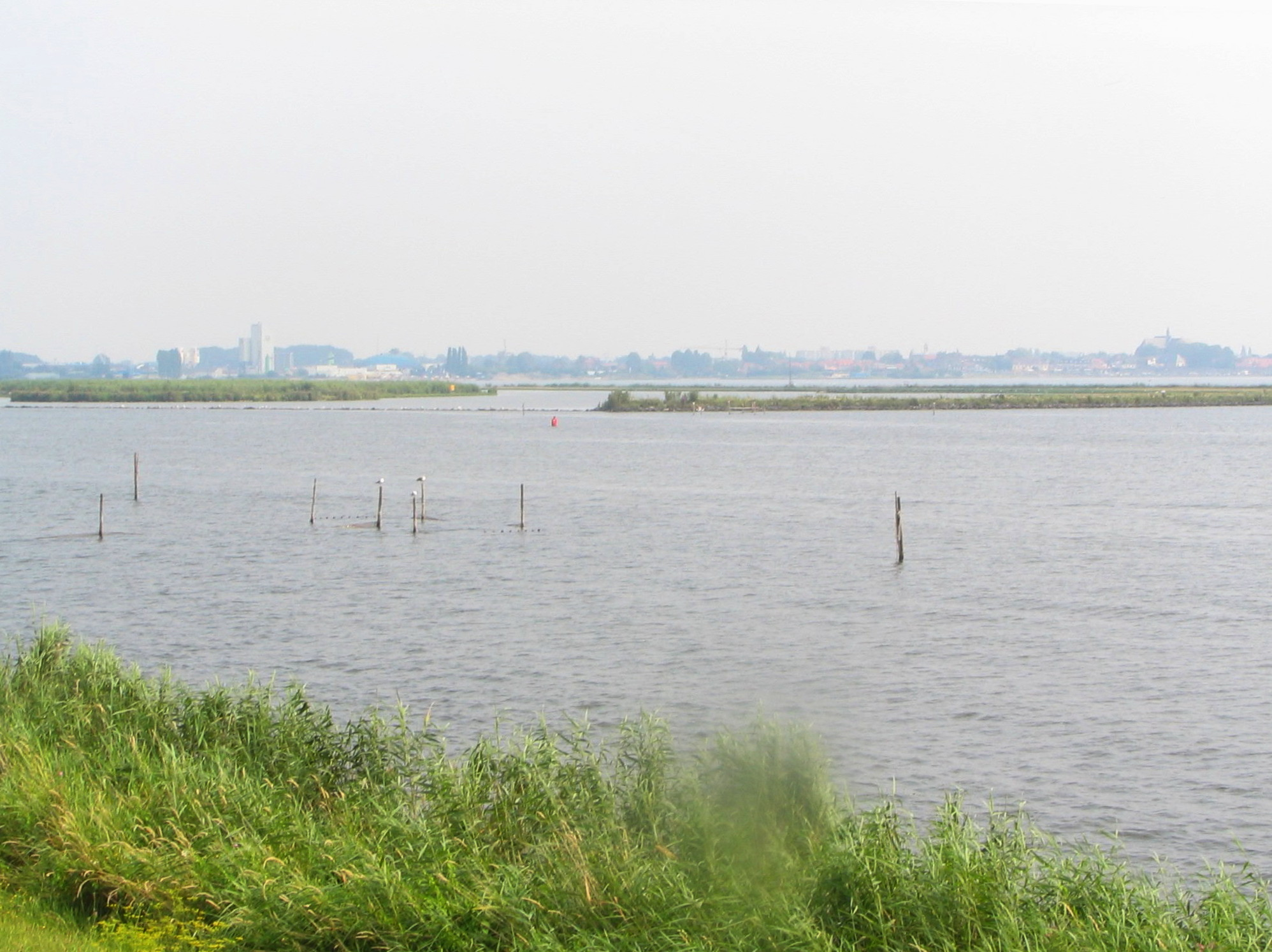
- Wolderwijd as seen from Flevoland looking towards Harderwijk

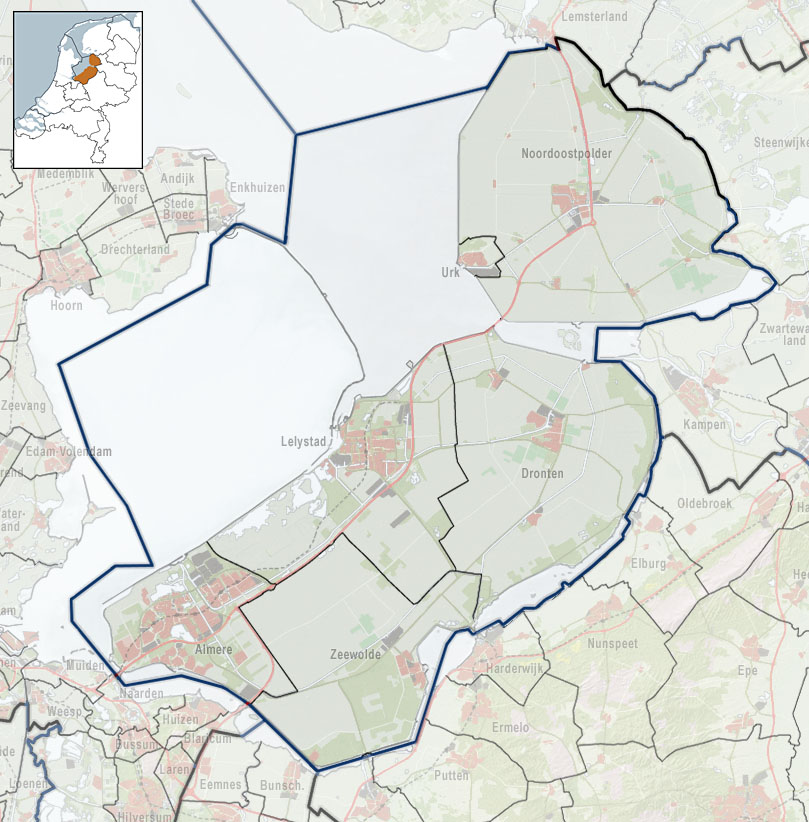
- The Wolderwijd amongst the bordering lakes of the province of Flevoland Location within the Netherlands
- Location: Between Flevoland and Gelderland
- Coordinates: 52°20′50″N 5°34′30″E
- Type: Bordering lake
- Basin countries: Netherlands
- Designation: Ramsar wetland of international importance (2000)
- Built: 1963
- Average depth: 1.7 m (5 ft 7 in)
- Islands: De Zegge, De Biezen
- Settlements: Harderwijk, Zeewolde

The Wolderwijd is a bordering lake situated in the Netherlands, created in 1967 by the gaining of land in Southern Flevoland. It is one of four Veluwe bordering lakes. On the northern and western bank it is encompassed by the municipality of Zeewolde, in the Province of Flevoland, and on the southern and eastern bank it is encompassed by the municipality of Harderwijk in the Province of Gelderland. As the bordering lakes of Flevoland are strictly speaking one mass of water there are no exact markers on where the Wolderwijd ends and the adjacent lakes start. In the west near Strand Horst the Wolderwijd becomes the Nuldernauw and in the east at the aqueduct at the provincial road N302 it becomes the Veluwemeer.

== Use ==
The lake was created as a buffer between the old land of the Veluwe and the newly created Flevopolder, to ensure that the water level of the Veluwe would not drop. The lake receives water from the neighboring Veluwemeer and several streams and sluices. An additional source is low-phosphate water from the Flevopolder to counter eutrophication.

The Wolderwijd lake is used for commercial fishery, boating, shipping traffic, water management, and sand extraction.

The lake, together with the Nuldernauw, has also been designated as a Ramsar wetland of international importance since 29 August 2000. It was designated as such because it held over 1% of relevant biogeographical populations of two bird species, the swan species Cygnus bewickii (1.6%) and the common pochard (Aythya ferina) (2.1%).
