= Eem =

Eem Amer
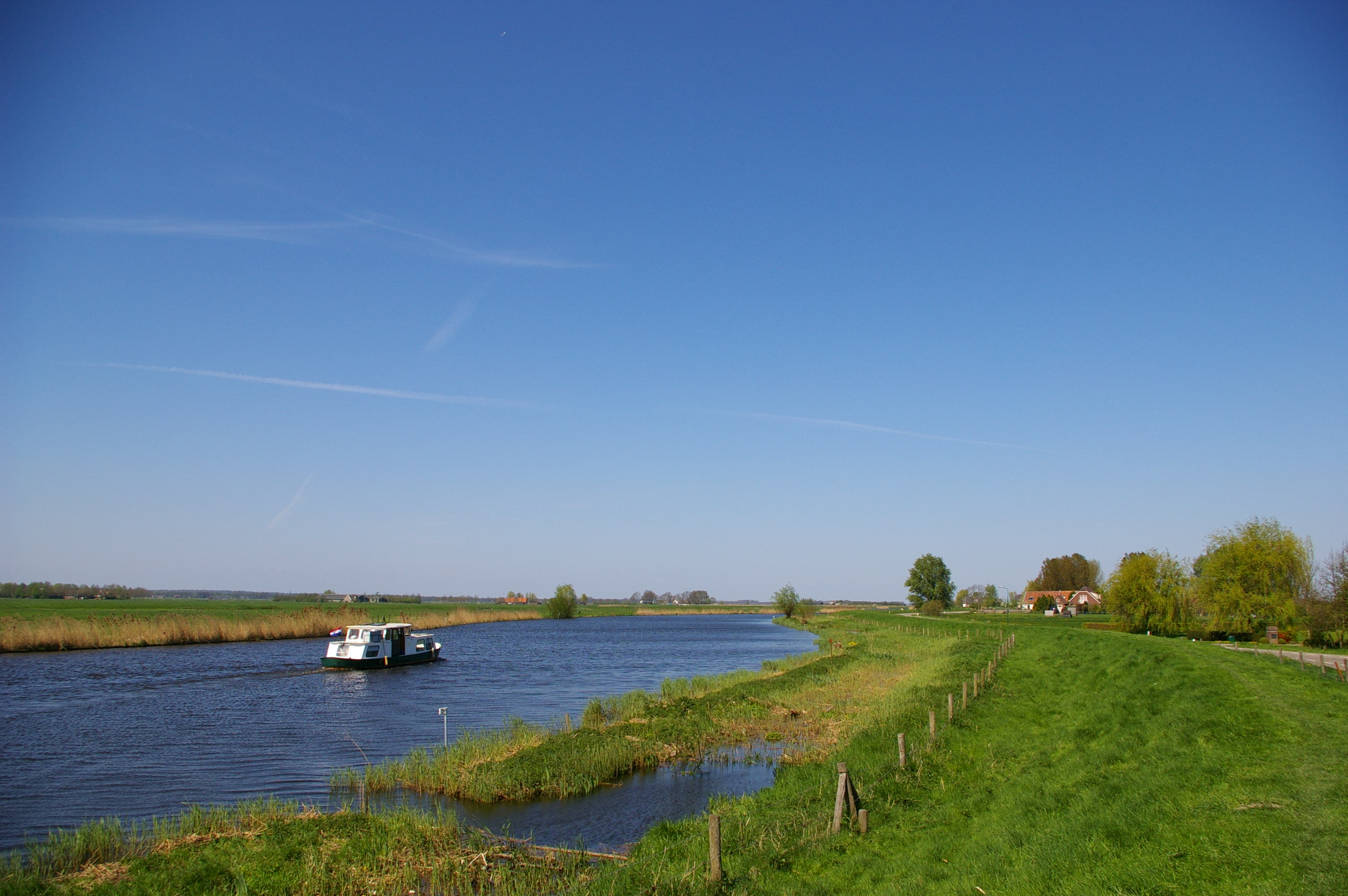
- The Eem near Eembrugge

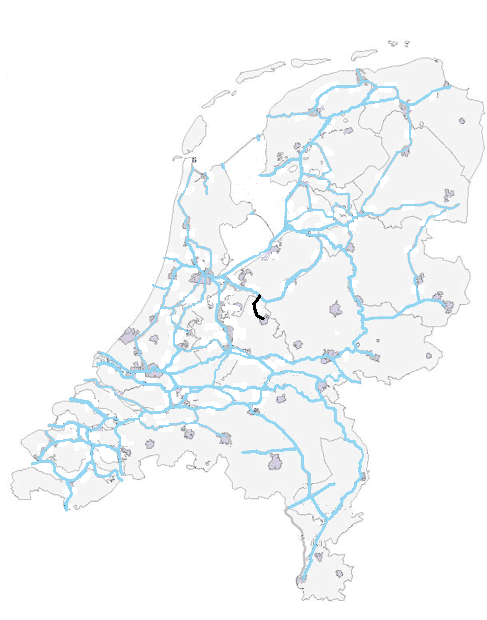
- Location of the Eem
- Etymology: From Latin Hemus

Location
- Country: Netherlands
- Region: Utrecht

Physical characteristics
- Source: Valleikanaal, Heiligenbergerbeek
  - location: Amersfoort, Utrecht, Netherlands
  - coordinates: 52°9′32″N 5°23′6″E
- Mouth: Eemmeer
  - location: Eemdijk, Utrecht, Netherlands
  - coordinates: 52°16′25″N 5°19′52″E
- Length: 18 km (11 mi)

The Eem ([eːm]; formerly the Amer) is a river in the central Netherlands with a length of approximately 18 kilometres (11 mi).

The river is fed by the Vallei Canal and a number of Veluwe creeks, the most important of which are the Heiligenberger Beek, the Barneveldse Beek and the Lunterse Beek, all of which come together in Amersfoort. The river then runs through the Eem Valley to the east of Soest, Baarn and Eemnes before emptying into the Eemmeer. The Eem is responsible for the largest portion of the drainage of the Gelder Valley. The polders of the Eem are valuable scenic landscapes.

Because of land subsidence as a result of drainage, the primate lies higher than the surrounding land. When water levels drop in the summer, water is pumped from the Nederrijn to the Eem through the Vallei Canal. Because of agricultural pollution carried by the Eem towards the Eemmeer, the biological richness of this lake is less than that of the other lakes which surround Flevoland.

The Eem gives its name to the Eemian interglacial era.

== Gallery ==
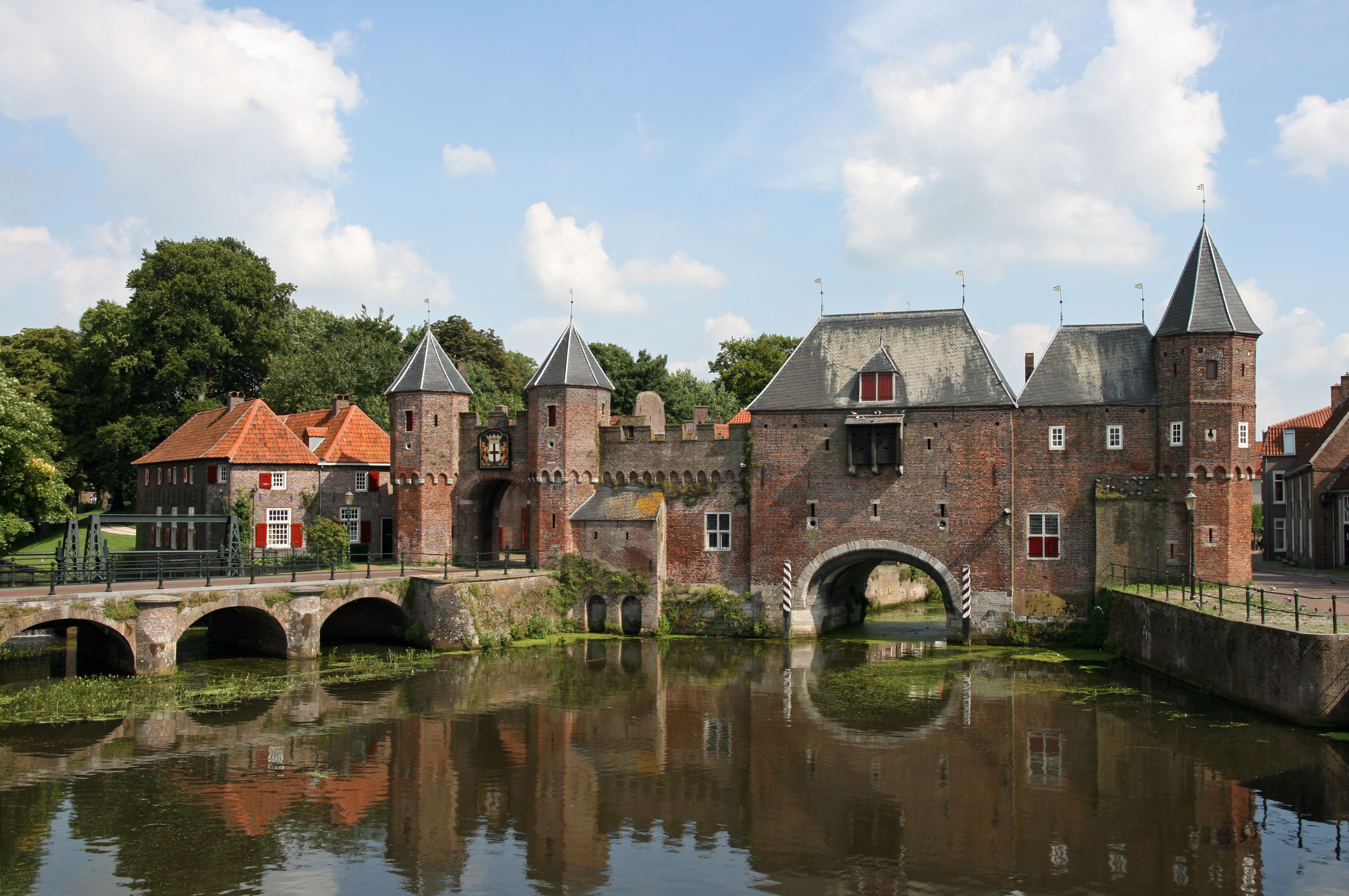
The Eem at the Koppelpoort

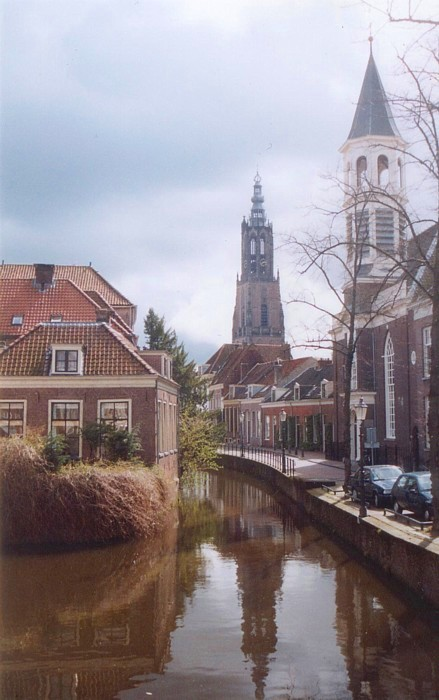
The Eem in Amersfoort

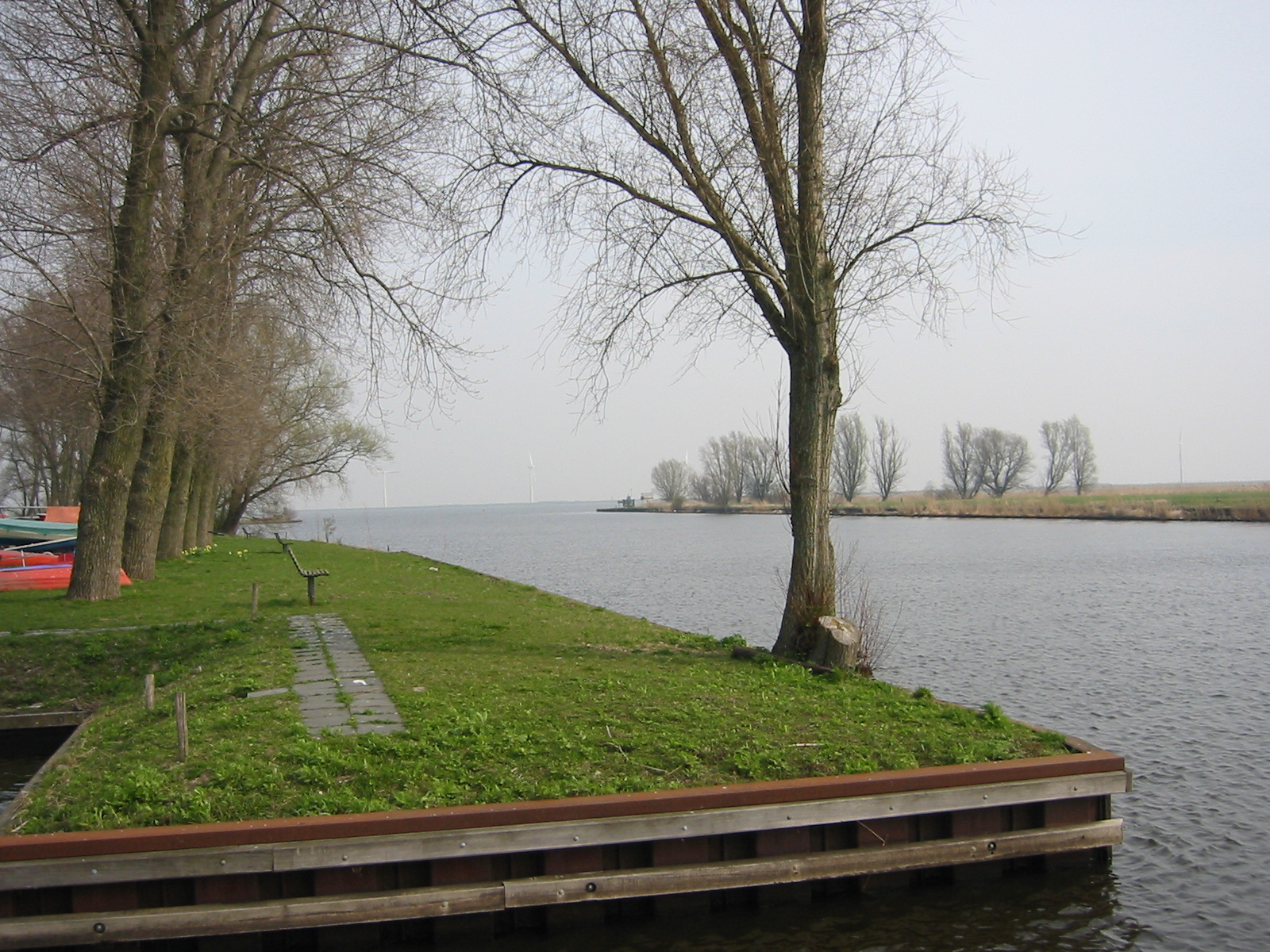
Mouth of the Eem
