= Eemmeer =

Lake in the Netherlands

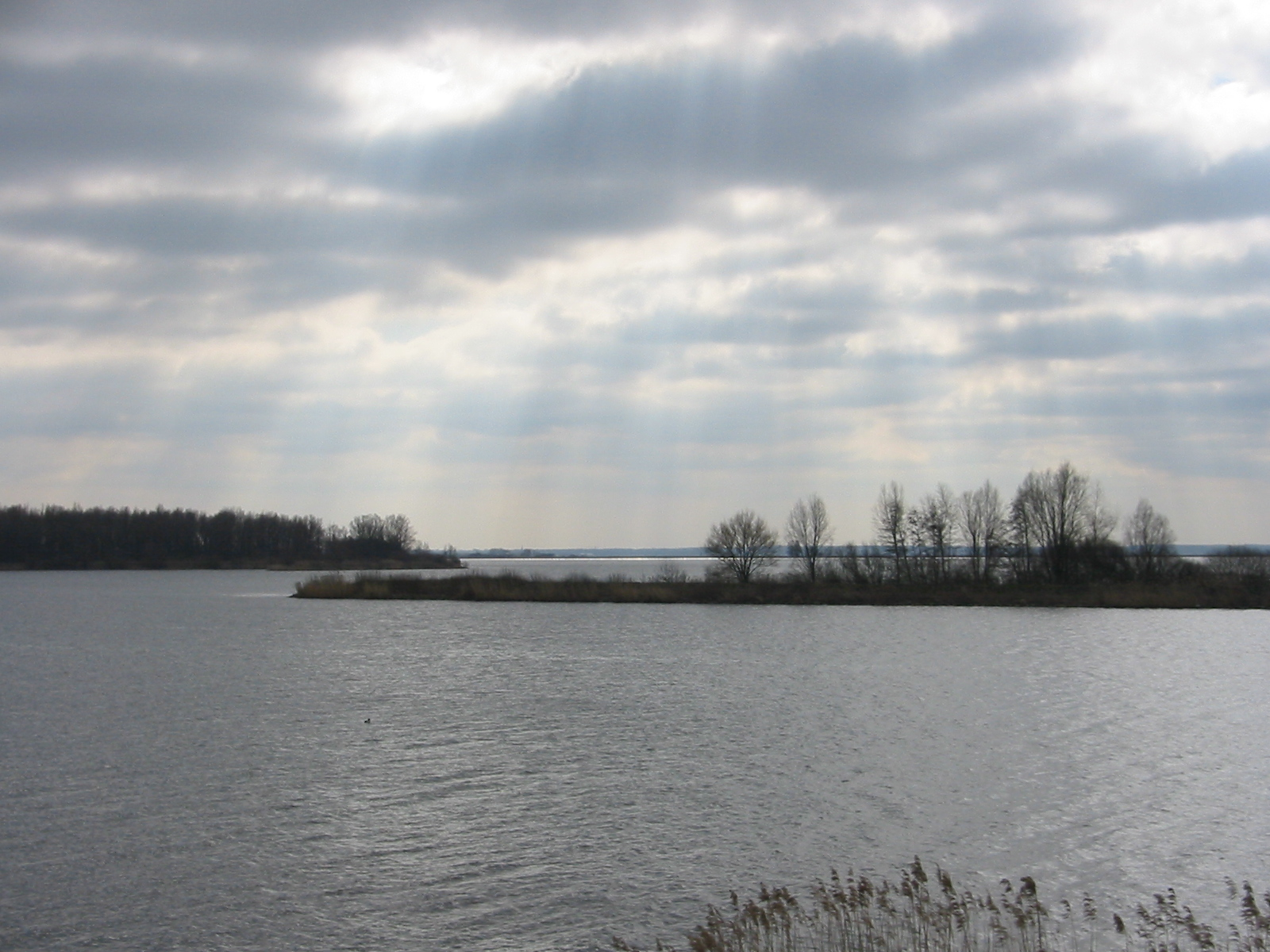

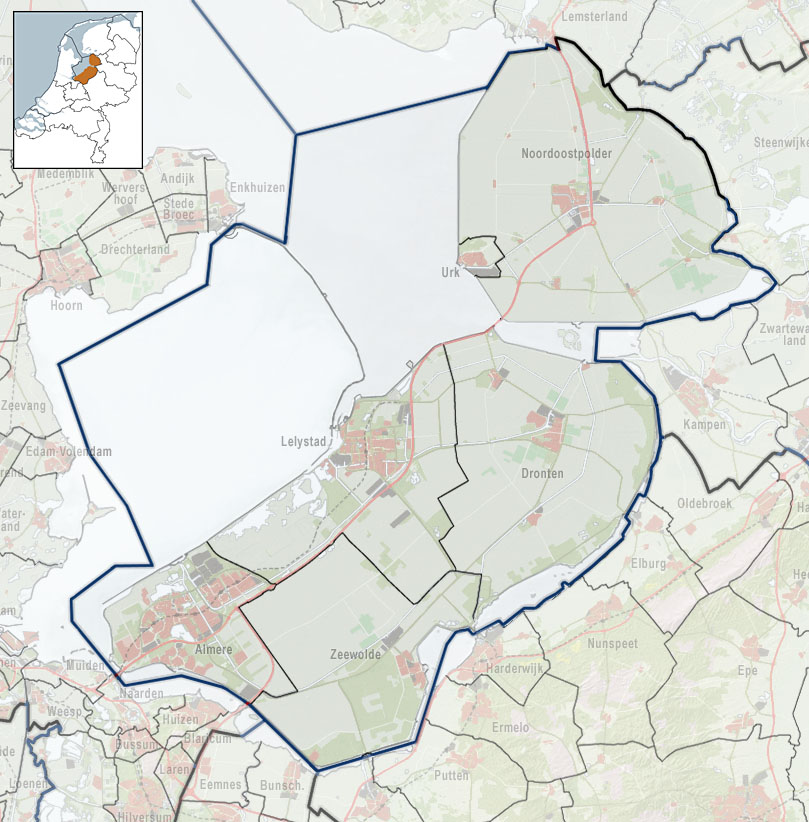
- Location within Flevoland
- Coordinates: 52°17′N 5°20′E
- Type: bordering lake
- Primary inflows: Eem
- Basin countries: Netherlands
- Max. length: 7.55 kilometres (4.69 mi)
- Max. width: 2.65 kilometres (1.65 mi)
- Surface area: 13.4 km^{2} (5.2 sq mi)
- Surface elevation: 0 metres (0 ft)
- Islands: Dode Hond, 5 islets
- Settlements: Bunschoten-Spakenburg

The Eemmeer (Dutch pronunciation: [ˈeːmeːr]) is a lake situated in the middle of the Netherlands between the provinces of Flevoland, Utrecht, and North Holland. It measures 13.4 square kilometres (5.2 sq mi) and contains one small island, the Dode Hond (Dead Dog). The Eemmeer is one in a series of peripheral lakes used to geohydrologically detach the low-lying polders of Flevoland from higher old mainland. The Eemmeer is connected to the peripheral lakes Gooimeer in the west, at the point where both lakes are crossed by the highway A27 bridge, and the Nijkerkernauw in the east. It is also connected to the lakes at the southern side of Markermeer near Amsterdam. The feeders of this lake system are the River IJssel (Rhine branch) and drains towards the North Sea.
