= Wieringerrandmeer =

The Wieringerrandmeer or bordering lake of Wieringen was a project in the Dutch province of North Holland and the (former) municipalities of Wieringen and Wieringermeer. It planned to create islands and a bordering lake. The project was canceled in 2010 by the provincial and national governments.

== History ==
Wieringen has been connected to the mainland since 1932 and is used, among other things, for housing and agriculture. In the mid-1990s, Wieringen initiated a project to restore its separate character by creating a bordering lake between North Holland and the polder of Wieringermeer. The authorities of North Holland agreed.

The Wieringerrandmeer was to be part of a series of lakes, including the Amstelmeer, the IJsselmeer and the Wadden Sea. It was intended to "boost economic and social development" by creating a recreational lake and stimulating business. The project's slogan was "the Experience of the lake."

== Development ==
In 2003, the province of North Holland, the various municipalities, and the Water Boards of the Netherlands published a contest for the development project. Five consortia attended. The winner Wirense consisted of Volker Wessels and Boskalis, which could participate in the project and take joint responsibility. The governments and the selected consortium drafted a Memorandum of Understanding for cooperation. On March 5, 2007, the public-private partnership (PPP) between the government (provincial and municipal) and operators (Boskalis, Volker Wessels) for the construction of Wieringerrandmeer ended. Subsequently, the planning and preparations were processed in more detail. On December 19th, 2007, the executive of North Holland approved the project.

The project was approved by the Steering Committee Wieringerrandmeer: the province, municipalities, and Wirense group. The National Forest areas and the water board would be involved.

== Planning ==
According to the original schedule, construction was scheduled to begin in summer 2010. It was expected to create the lake in five years, but all the work could last until around 2030.

== Nature ==
With the construction of Wieringerrandmeer, continuity could be established between the IJsselmeer and Amstelmeer for forests, water bodies and reedbeds. This continuity of the provincial ecological structure, was called the Northern Arc.

== Land use ==
The completed plan would include: a total area of 600 hectares (6 km^{2}), including 250 hectares (2.5 km^{2}) for housing; about 860 hectares (8.6 km^{2}) of water surface; over 400 hectares (4 km^{2}) of new nature and 128 hectares (1.28 km^{2}) of forest plantations.

== Opposition and alternatives ==
Opponents of the project were concerned that the project would alter the region's water balance and adversely effect agricultural land, with thirty farms in Wieringen and Wieringermeer closing and many farmers forced to move away.

One June 27, 2008 The other Wieringerrandmeer presented an alternative plan developed by residents and farmers who were part of environmental organizations. They proposed reducing the area to be flooded, building fewer homes that would be located closer to the lake, and requiring fewer farms to relocate. Some luxury items, such as the creation of the Zuiderhaven lock between the Amstelmeer and the IJsselmeer, were removed. It concluded that it was unnecessary to build a large lake on the edge of North-Holland.

== The final decision ==
On November 3, 2010 the Gedeputeerde staten of North Holland canceled the project for financial reasons; on November 15 the States-Provincial of the Netherlands confirmed the decision.
