= Frisian Lakes =

Lakes in Friesland, Netherlands

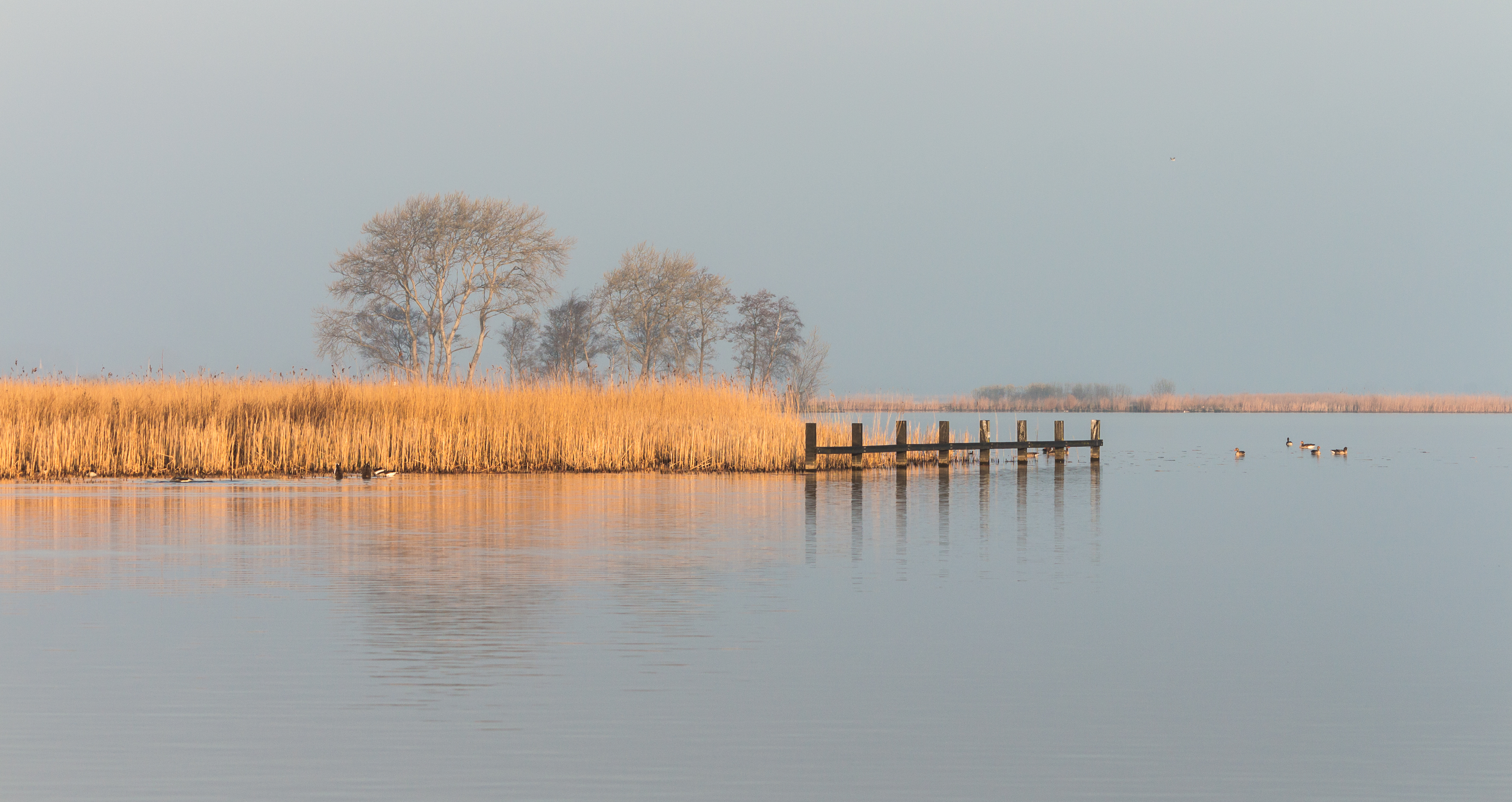
A view of Goëngarijpsterpoelen, one of the Frisian Lakes

The Frisian Lakes consists of 24 lakes in central and southwest Friesland, a province of the Netherlands located in the northern part of the country.

== The lakes ==
There are many large and small lakes in the Frisian Lakes area, plus a number of them that are not directly in this South-Western part of Friesland, but are still commonly included when referring to the Frisian Lakes. Below is an incomplete list of the most prominent ones. Note that the Frisian names, here indicated in italic, are the official ones. The largest ones are indicated in bold.

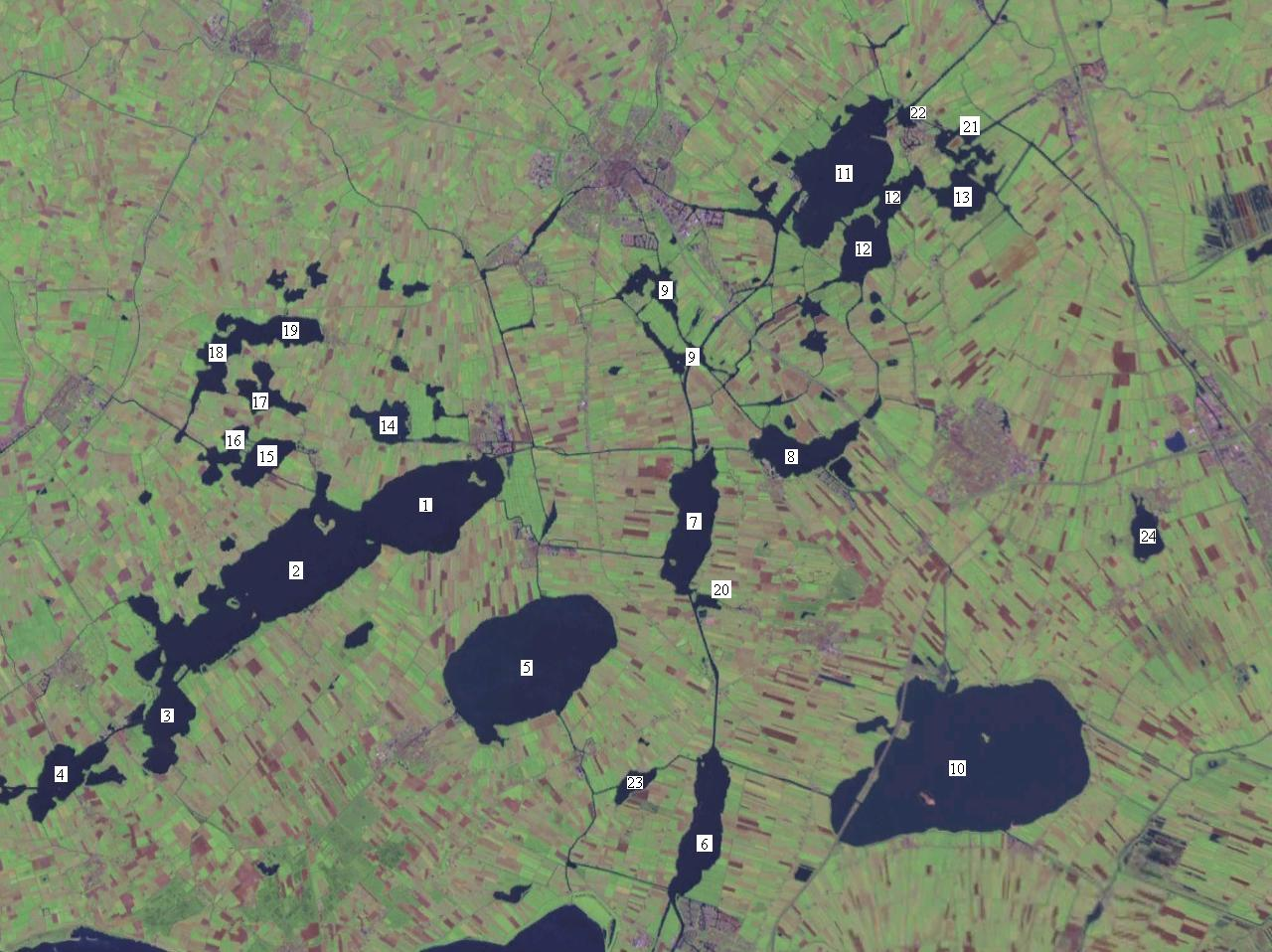
Overview of the Frisian Lakes

1. **Heegermeer** (Hegemer Mar)
2. **Fluessen** (Fluezen)
3. De Holken
4. Morra (De Morra)
5. **Slotermeer** (Friesland)|Slotermeer (Sleattemer Mar)
6. **Groote Brekken** (Grutte Brekken)
7. Koevordermeer (De Kûfurd)
8. Langweerderwielen (Langwarder Wielen)
9. Witte en Zwarte Brekken en Oudhof (Wite Brekken, Swarte Brekken en Aldhôf)
10. **Tjeukemeer** (Tsjûkemar)
11. **Sneekermeer** (Snitser Mar)
12. Goëngarijpsterpoelen (Goaiïngarypster Puollen)
13. Terkaplesterpoelen (Terkaplester Puollen)
14. Idzegaasterpoel (Idzegeaster Poel)
15. Grote Gaastmeer (Grutte Gaastmar)
16. Zandmeer (Sânmar)
17. Ringwiel
18. Vlakke Brekken (Flakke Brekken)
19. Oudegaasterbrekken (Aldegeaster Brekken)
20. Idskenhuistermeer (Jiskenhúster Mar)
21. Terhornsterpoelen (Terhernster Puollen)
22. Terhornstermeer (De Hoarne)
23. Brandemeer (Brandemar)
24. Nannewijd (Nannewiid)

== Sports ==
In the summer, regatta boat races are held at some of the Frisian Lakes in south Friesland.

== Tourism ==
The Frisian Lakes attract boaters from all over the Netherlands in the summer. The highlight of the Frisian boating season is the Sneekweek, an annual boating event held in Sneek, the largest town of the area.

== See also ==
- List of lakes of the Netherlands
- West Frisian Islands
