= Tom Viezee =

Dutch Christian minister and politician

Tom A. Viezee (born 1950) is a Dutch Christian minister and former politician.

As a member of the Reformatory Political Federation Viezee was a councillor of Alphen aan den Rijn from 1990 to 1999. From 1993 to 1994 he also was an alderman and from 1994 to 1999 also RPF fraction leader.

On behalf of the RPF and later on for its successor the ChristianUnion he became mayor of Zeewolde on 1 March 1999. He stayed mayor till 1 October 2004 when he stepped down and became pastor in the Netherlands Reformed Churches in Krommenie on 20 February 2005. He was able to do so because he had been studying theology at VU University Amsterdam in the early 90s.

== Personal life ==
Tom Viezee is married and has three children. Although a member of the Netherlands Reformed Churches he originates from the Dutch Reformed Church.
