= Vuurtoreneiland =

Islet in North Holland, the Netherlands

Vuurtoreneiland Hoek van 't IJ
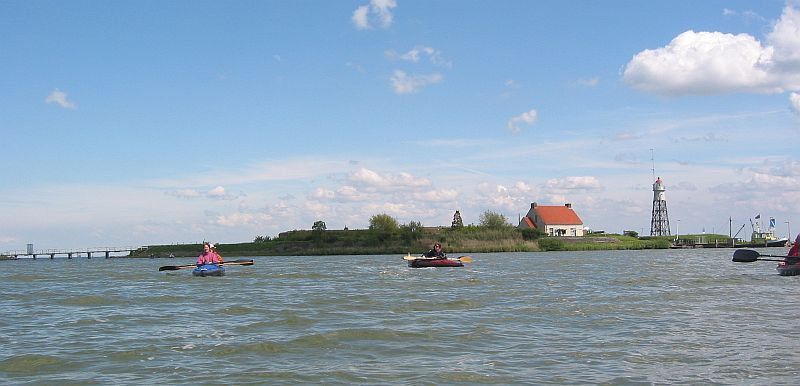
- Vuurtoreneiland
- Location: Durgerdam, Netherlands
- Coordinates: 52°22′18.6″N 5°0′50.9″E

Tower
- Constructed: 1700 (first)
- Construction: cast iron tower
- Height: 19.5 metres (64 ft)
- Shape: octagonal skeletal tower with enclosed observation room, balcony and lantern
- Markings: black tower, white observation room and lantern, red lantern dome
- Operator: Staatsbosbeheer
- Heritage: Rijksmonument, World Heritage Site

Light
- First lit: 1893 (current)
- Deactivated: 2003-2005
- Focal height: 18 metres (59 ft)
- Intensity: 2,850,000 cd
- Range: 14 nautical miles (26 km) (white); 11 nautical miles (20 km) (red)
- Characteristic: Oc WR 5s.
- Netherlands no.: NL-1710

Vuurtoreneiland ("Lighthouse Island") is a small island in the IJmeer, Netherlands, just off the coast of Durgerdam. The island's main function is as a base for a lighthouse; a military fort on the island was abandoned in the 1930s.

== History of lighthouse and fort ==
The island's lighthouse has been in operation since 1700; it is named for the opposite point on the mainland, Hoek van 't IJ, or "Corner of the IJ." The first lighthouse was a square, stone building. Then, in 1809, the island was equipped with a military post, which, in 1844, was expanded to a real fort, which, in 1883, became a part of the Stelling van Amsterdam. Finally, the lighthouse was replaced with a cast-iron construction in 1893, which is still standing.

At the end of the nineteenth century, a bomb-proof building and artillery battery were built on the island, but its five guns were moved to Den Helder in 1904. In 1959, it was delisted as a stronghold, but the last soldiers had left long before. In 1981, the island was listed as a Rijksmonument, and in 1996, a bridge was built, which connected the island and the mainland. The fog signal was deactivated in 2001, and the light was extinguished in 2003 when the last lighthouse keeper retired. It was rekindled in 2005.

== Current status ==
The island is a UNESCO World Heritage Site. It is owned by the Dutch state, and is managed by Staatsbosbeheer. Since a few years, a restaurant is located on the island, with a daily ferry service from Amsterdam.

== See also ==
- List of lighthouses in the Netherlands
