= Zeewolde =

- Municipality
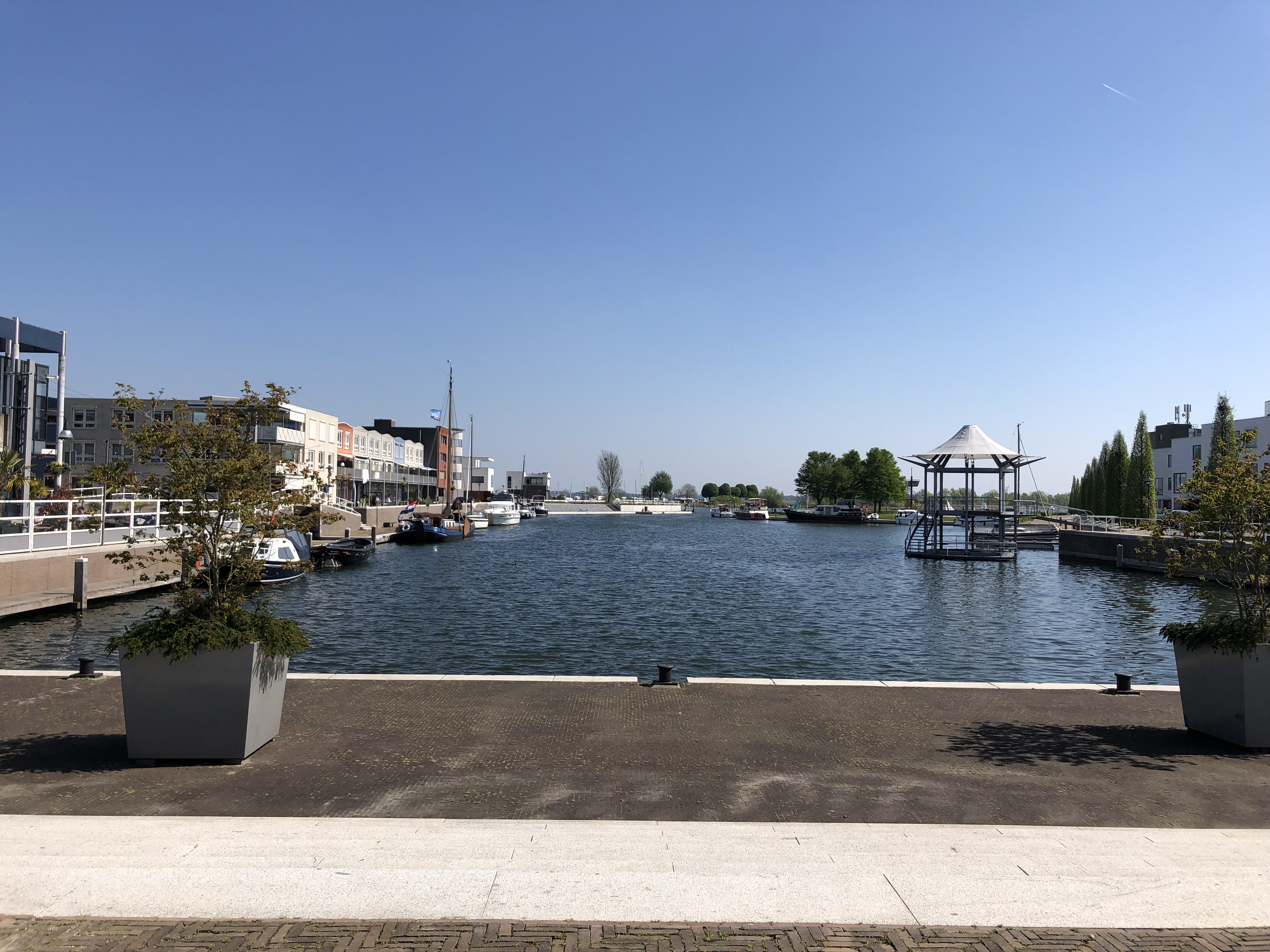
- Zeewolde harbor

- Flag Coat of arms

- Location in Flevoland
- Coordinates: 52°20′N 5°33′E
- Country: Netherlands
- Province: Flevoland
- Established: 1 January 1984

Government
  - Body: Municipal council
  - Mayor: Bram Harmsma

Area
  - Total: 268.86 km^{2} (103.81 sq mi)
  - Land: 247.23 km^{2} (95.46 sq mi)
  - Water: 21.63 km^{2} (8.35 sq mi)
- Elevation: 2 m (6.6 ft)

Population (January 2021)
  - Total: 22,879
  - Density: 93/km^{2} (240/sq mi)
- Time zone: UTC+1 (CET)
  - Summer (DST): UTC+2 (CEST)
- Postcode: 3890–3899
- Area code: 036
- Website: www.zeewolde.nl

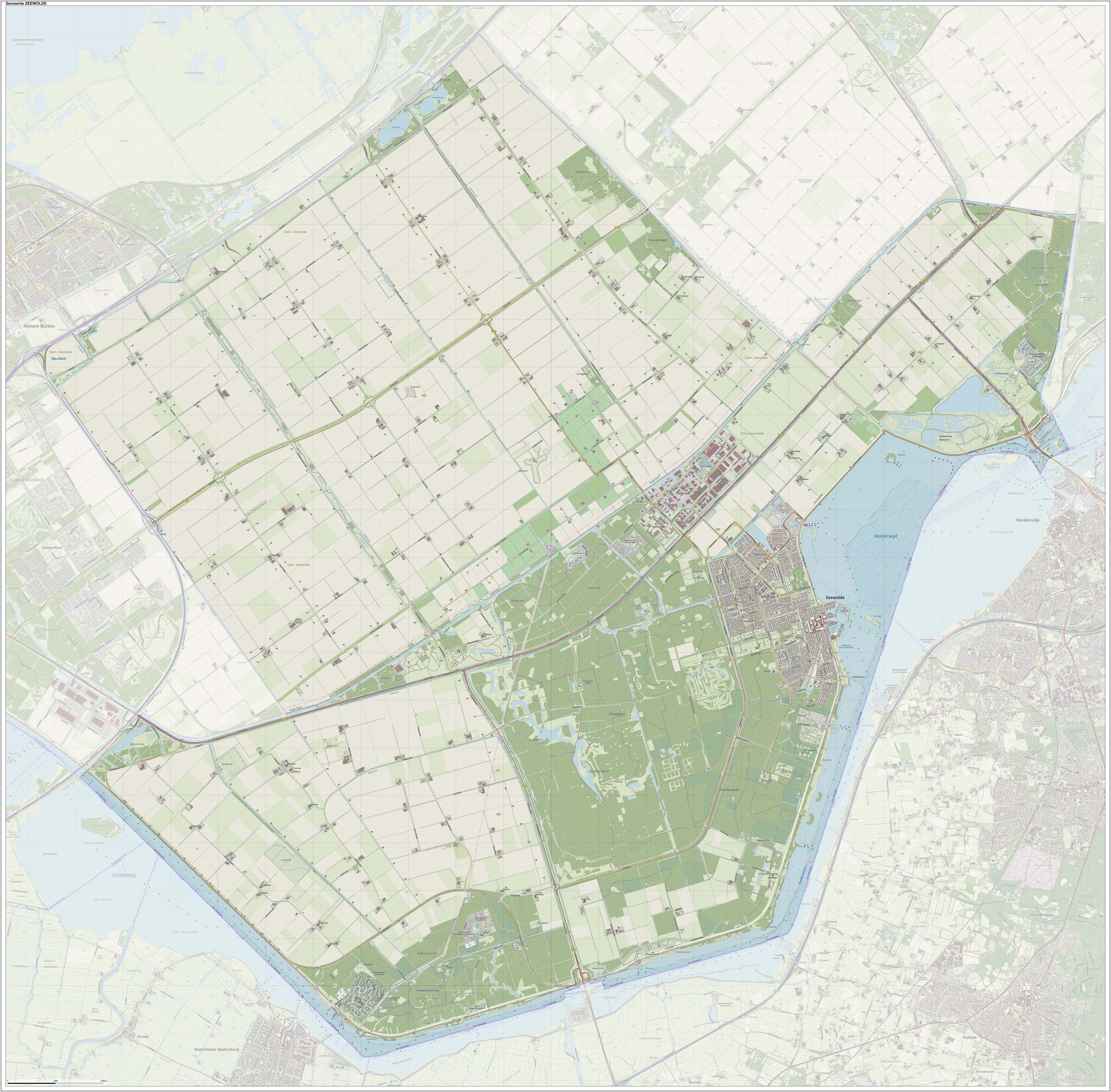
Dutch Topographic map of the municipality of Zeewolde, Sept. 2014.

Zeewolde (Dutch pronunciation: [zeːˈʋɔldə]) is a municipality and a town in the Flevoland province in the central Netherlands. It has a population of approximately 24,000 (2024). It is situated in the polder of Flevoland with the small lake called the Wolderwijd to the east. To the south is a large deciduous forest called the Horsterwold. The area to the west is principally agricultural.

Zeewolde is known for its landscape and nature art. The best-known art work is Sea Level by Richard Serra, located in the De Wetering landscape park.

In the Hulkesteinse forest there is the naturist resort Flevo-Natuur, with recreation bungalows, a camp site, and the possibility of day recreation.

== History ==
The municipality of Zeewolde was founded in 1984 and is therefore one of the youngest in the Netherlands. Before 1984, the area was administered by the Openbaar Lichaam Zuidelijke IJsselmeerpolders (OLZIJ) (English: Public Body of Southern IJsselmeer Polders), founded by the Dutch national government after the province of Flevoland was created. The name 'Zeewolde' was always meant to be used during the planning stages, but on various locations.

Zeewolde's first inhabitants were the so-called 'pioneers', moving in from the 'old land' to the newly created polder in 1979. They were mostly farmers and in the beginning stages deprived of amenities such as electricity or tap water. The planned village was then mostly meant to provide services to the neighbouring farmers. Alongside the farmers, two holiday resorts were founded in the area.

In August 1980, the Zeewolde advisory board, headed by Han Lammers who was at the time the head of the OLZIJ, met for the first time. In February 1982, municipal elections were held and the first streekplan (Structural plan) was drawn, envisaging the village to grow to 15.000 inhabitants. The actual village itself was started in 1983, after which in 1984 Zeewolde became a municipality in its own right. On 23 February 1984, the official first inhabitant of the village of Zeewolde was handed the keys of his house.

In August 2024 it was reported that the remnants of Hulkenstein Castle might have been found in a lake near Zeewolde.

== Transportation ==
There are no railway stations in the municipality, but the nearest stations are Harderwijk, Nijkerk and the stations in Almere. There are bus connections to the stations in Harderwijk, Nijkerk and Amersfoort, and to the central station in Almere.

== Notable people ==
- Tom Viezee (born 1950) Christian minister and former politician, Mayor of Zeewolde 1999-2004
- Geke Faber (born 1952) politician, Mayor of Zeewolde 1990-1998
- Tim Visser (born 1987 in Zeewolde) rugby union player who plays for the Scotland national team
- Sabrina van der Donk (born 1988 in Zeewolde) model who participated in the Miss Earth 2006
- Sep Visser (born 1990 in Zeewolde) rugby union player with Edinburgh Rugby
- Luc ter Haar (born 1993 in Zeewolde) speed skater

== Gallery ==
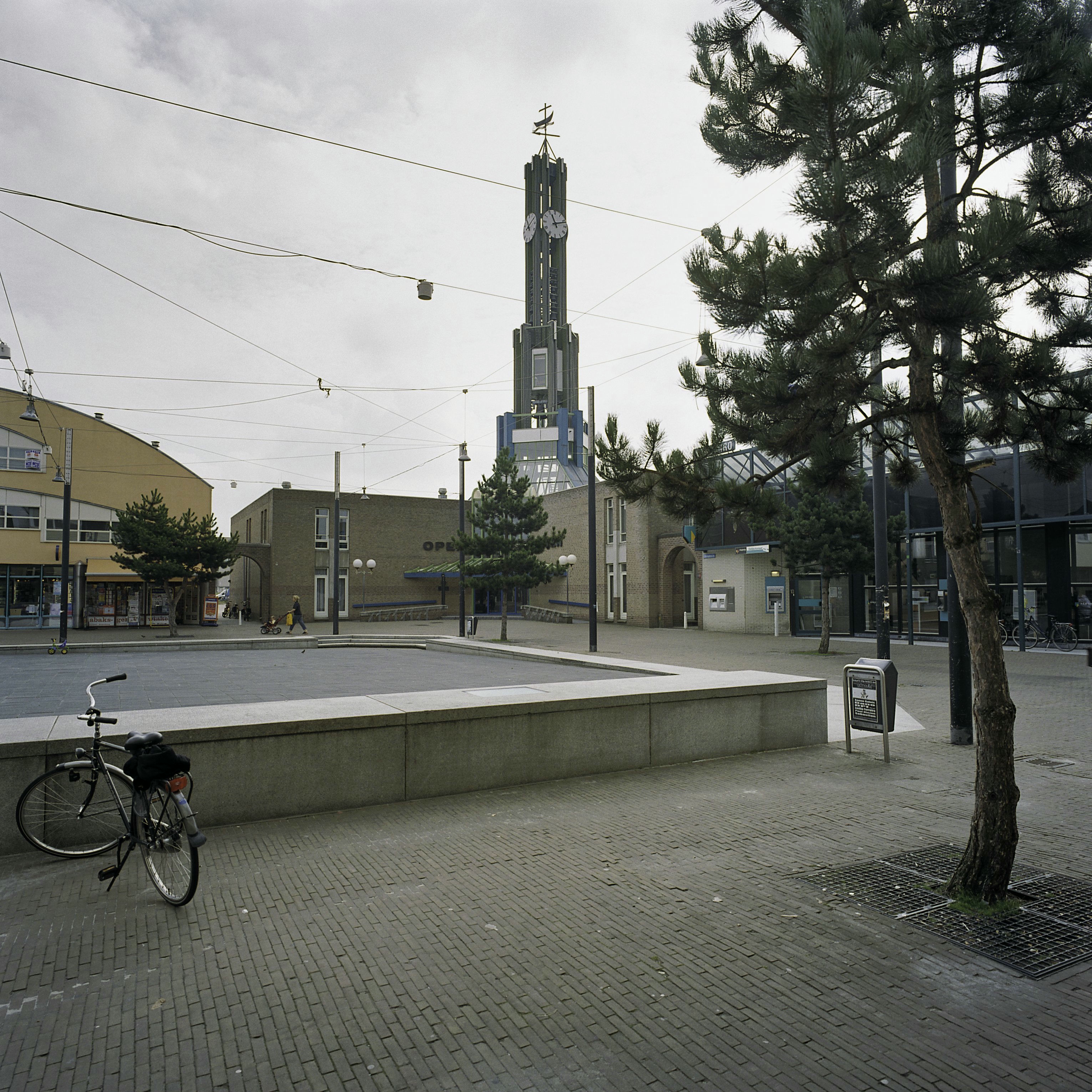
View of tower of Open Haven church center as seen from square

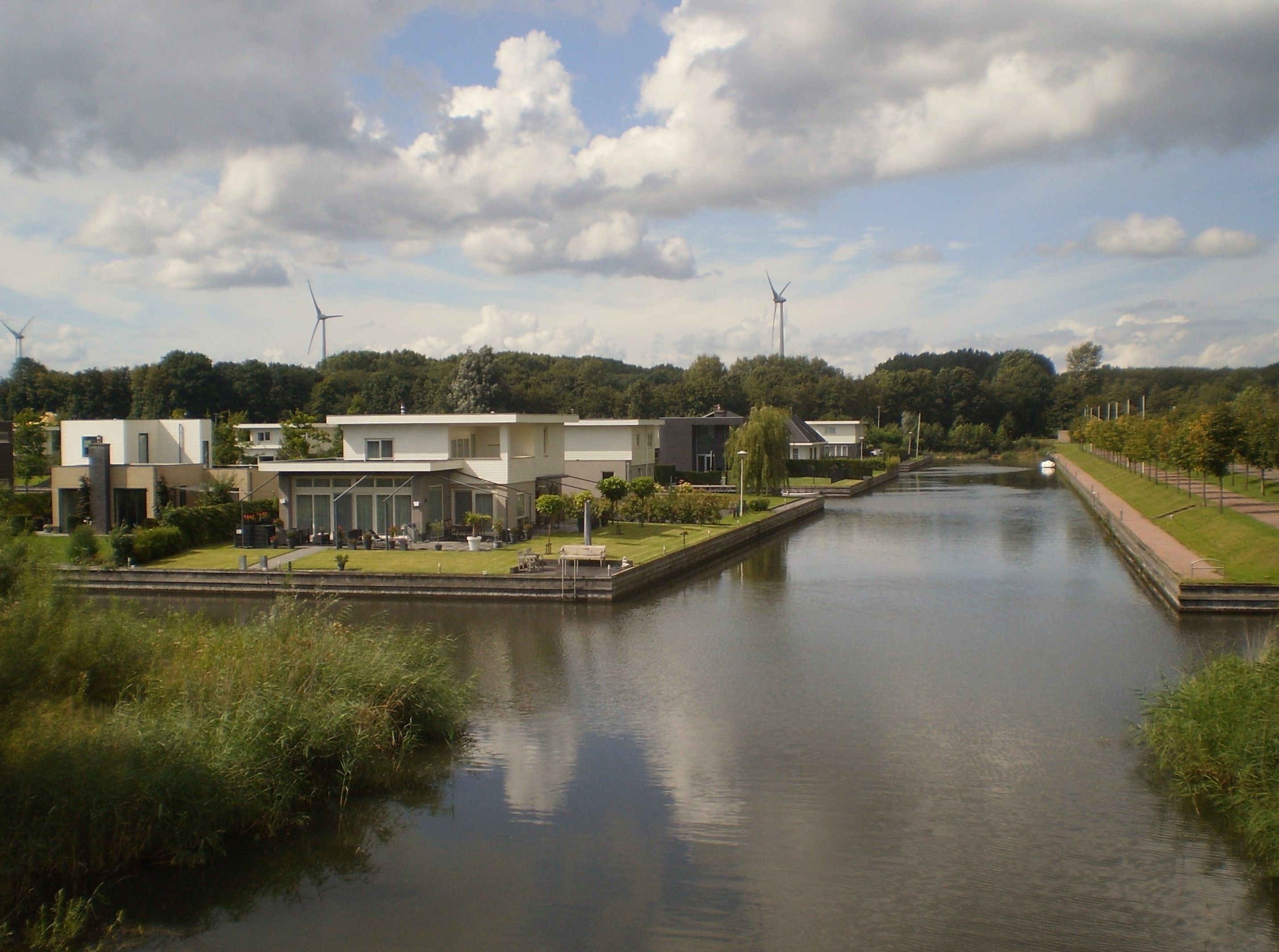
Harderwold

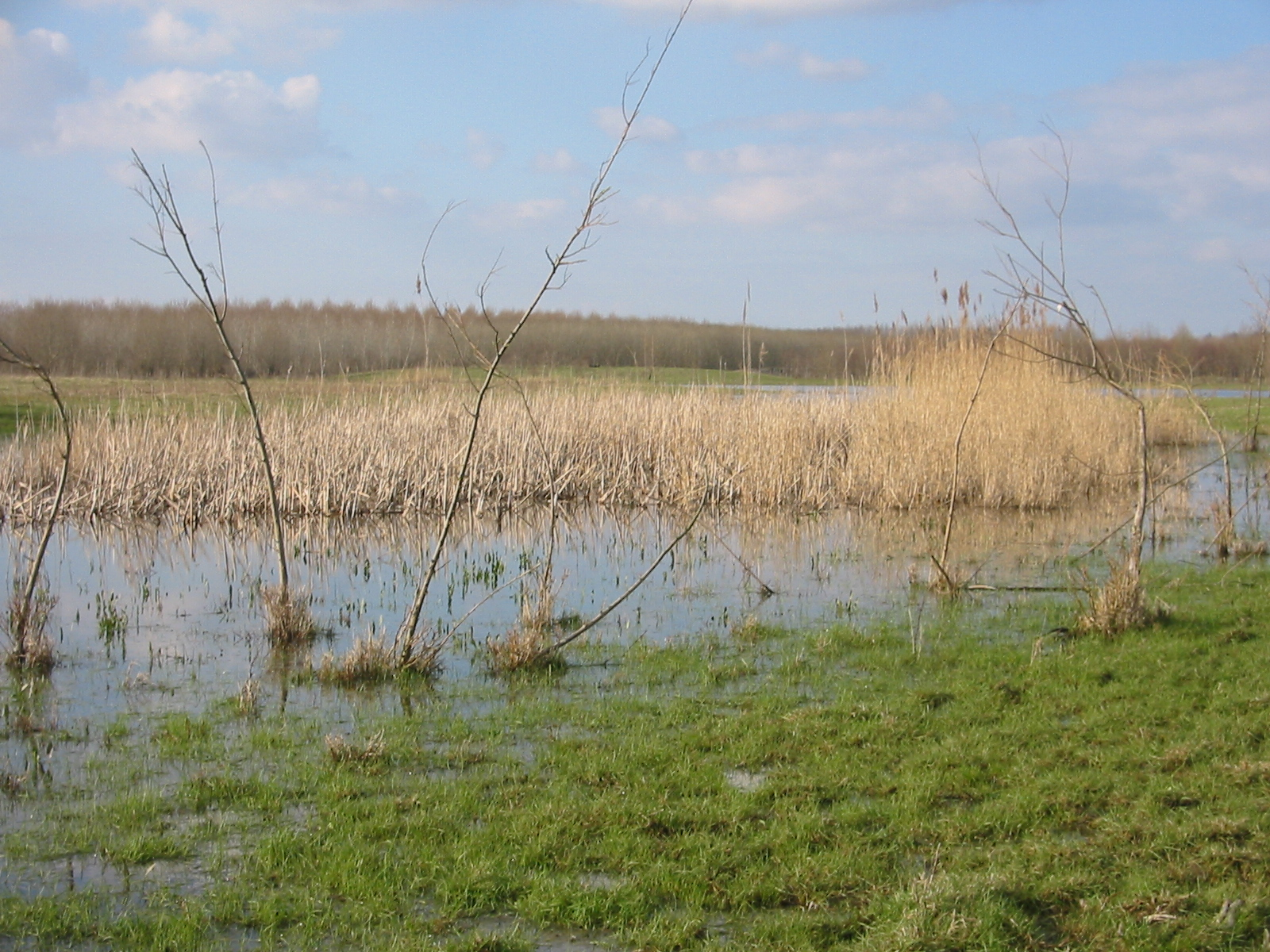
Horsterwold forest

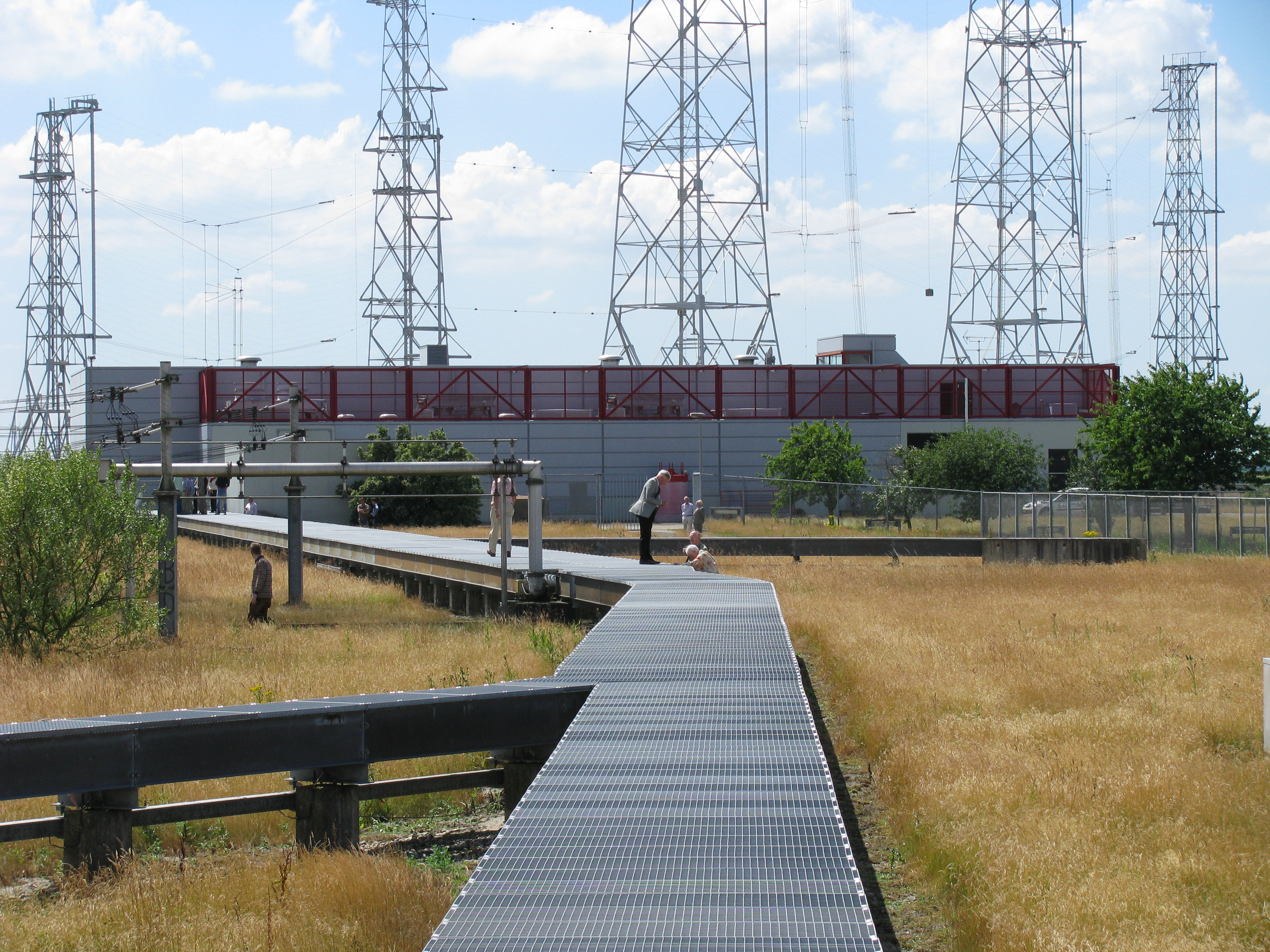
Shortwave transmitter Flevo
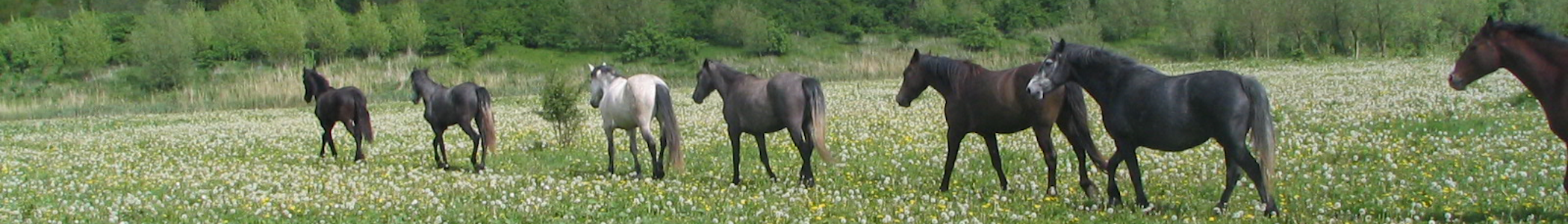
Zeewolde
