= IJmeer =

Bodering lake between Waterland and Amsterdam

- Location within North Holland

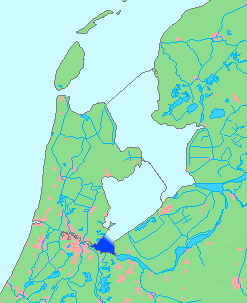
- Map
- Location: North Holland, Flevoland
- Coordinates: 52°22′N 5°04′E
- Type: bordering lake
- Basin countries: Netherlands
- Surface area: 80.0 km^{2} (30.9 sq mi)
- Average depth: 2.6 m (8 ft 6 in)

Ramsar Wetland
- Official name: Markermeer & IJmeer
- Designated: 29 August 2000
- Reference no.: 1245

The IJmeer is a 'bordering lake' (Randmeer) in the Netherlands straddling the provinces of North Holland and Flevoland. Namely, it is the southwestern section of the Markermeer. It is an important habitat for birds such as the tufted duck and scaup.

== Geography ==
The IJmeer is bordered, and separated from the IJ, by the Oranje Locks to the east, a straight line extending from Uitdam to the Almere-Pampus to the northeast, and the Hollandse Brug to the southeast, where it connects with the Gooimeer.

== Houses in the IJmeer ==
Since 1998 islands have been built for the new suburb of IJburg. The first houses were ready in 2003. On 24 November 2004 the Council of State ruled that the construction of further new islands was provisionally banned, because the consequences for the environment were insufficiently researched.

== Further plans for the IJmeer ==
In 2006, the Council for Transport and Public Works and the Environment Board issued a joint opinion stating that Amsterdam and Almere should become conjoined cities with the IJmeer as a 'Central Park'. Partly to this end, Almere has announced plans to build residential areas in the IJmeer, in order for Amsterdam and Almere to grow closer together. There are plans for a connection between Amsterdam and Almere, straight through the IJmeer, through IJburg, and the planned Almere Pampus. Most likely this connection will be a bridge with lanes for public transport (metro and RER-like) and road.

== Islands ==
- De Drost
- Hooft
- IJburg islands
- Pampus
- Vuurtoreneiland
- Warenar
