= Kralingse Plas =

Lake in Rotterdam, Netherlands

Kralingse Plas Kralingen Lake
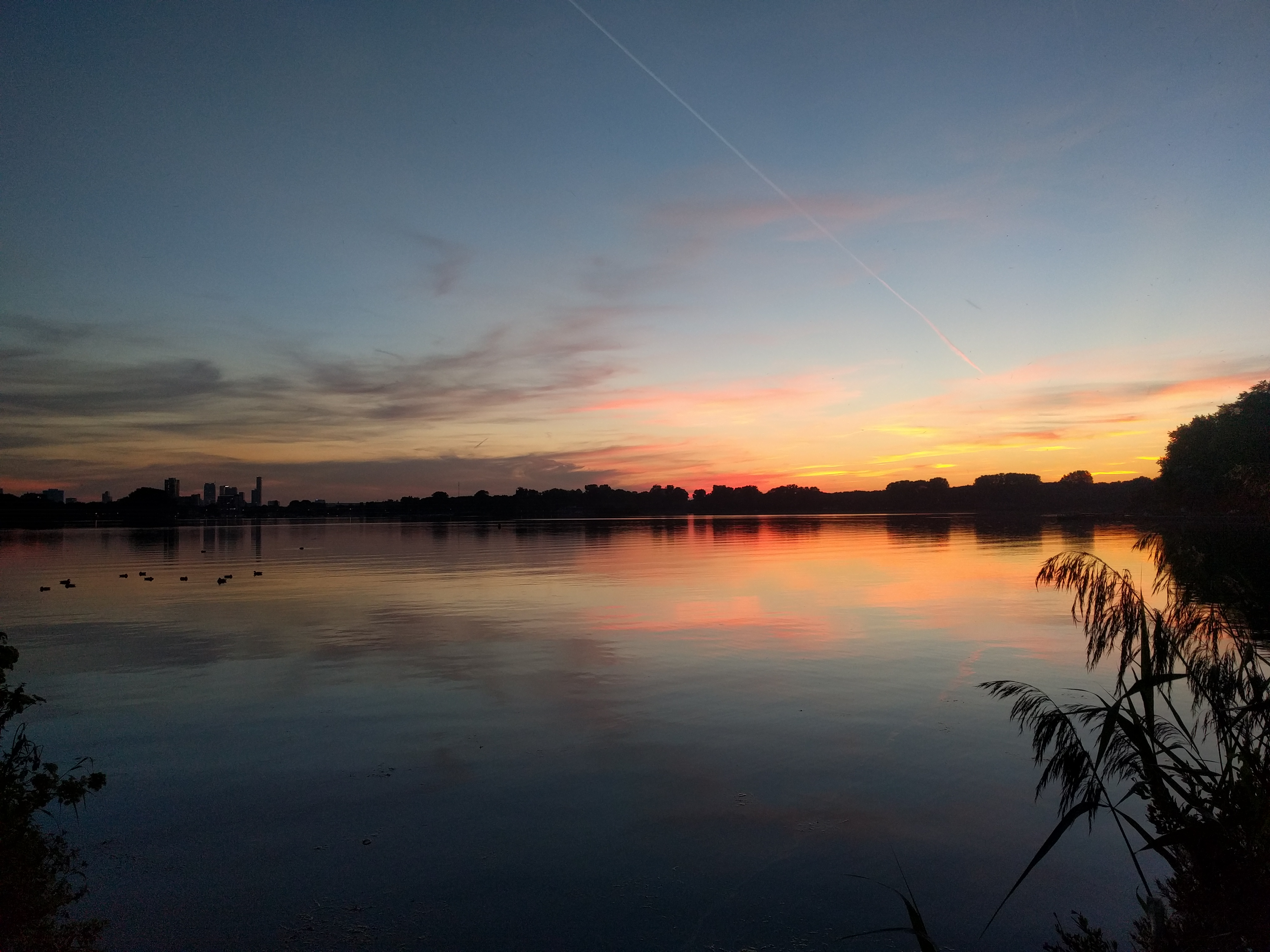
- Rotterdam over the Kralingse Plas

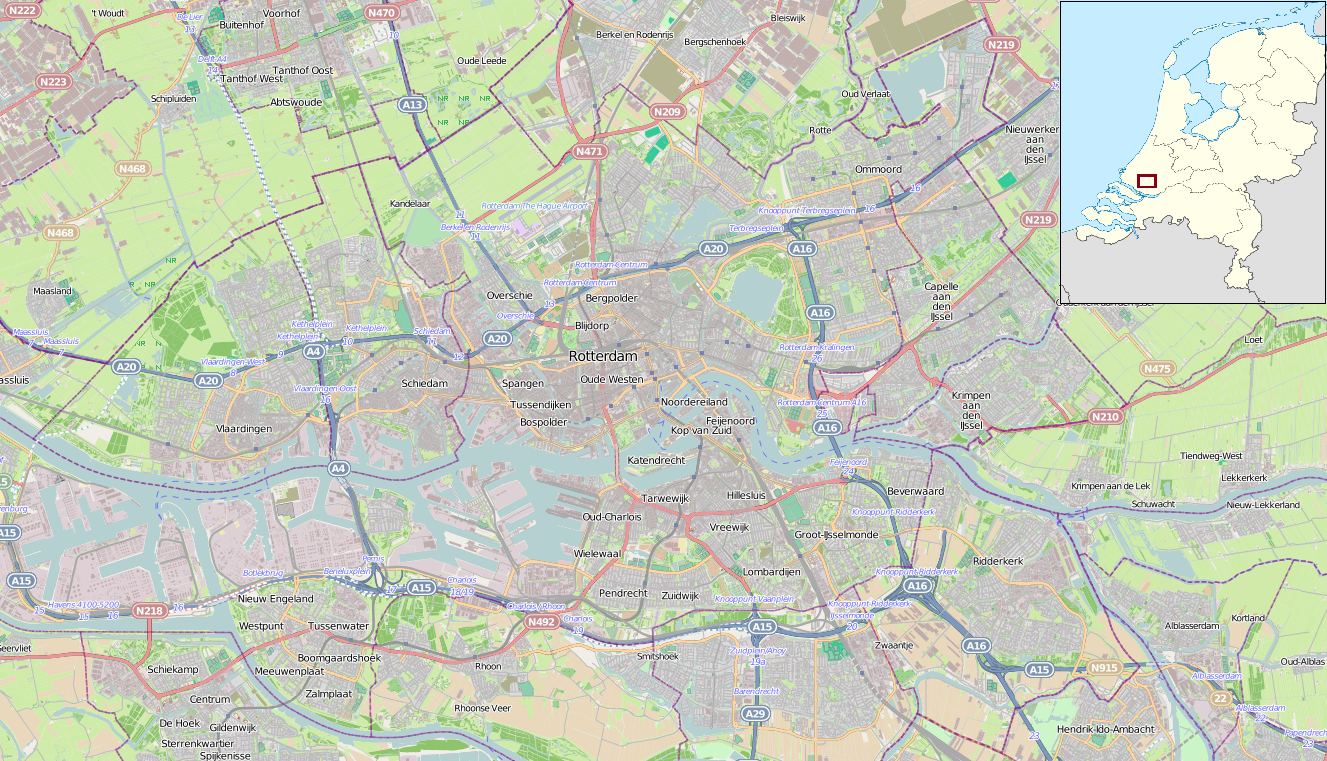
- Location within Rotterdam Location within Netherlands
- Coordinates: 51°56′10″N 4°30′55″E
- Basin countries: Netherlands
- Settlements: Rotterdam

The Kralingse Plas is a lake located in the suburb of Kralingen in Rotterdam, the Netherlands. The water is mainly used for watersport, fishing and recreational activities.

The Kralingse Plas was created due to peat extractions.
