= Bordering lakes =

Chain of Lakes in the Netherlands

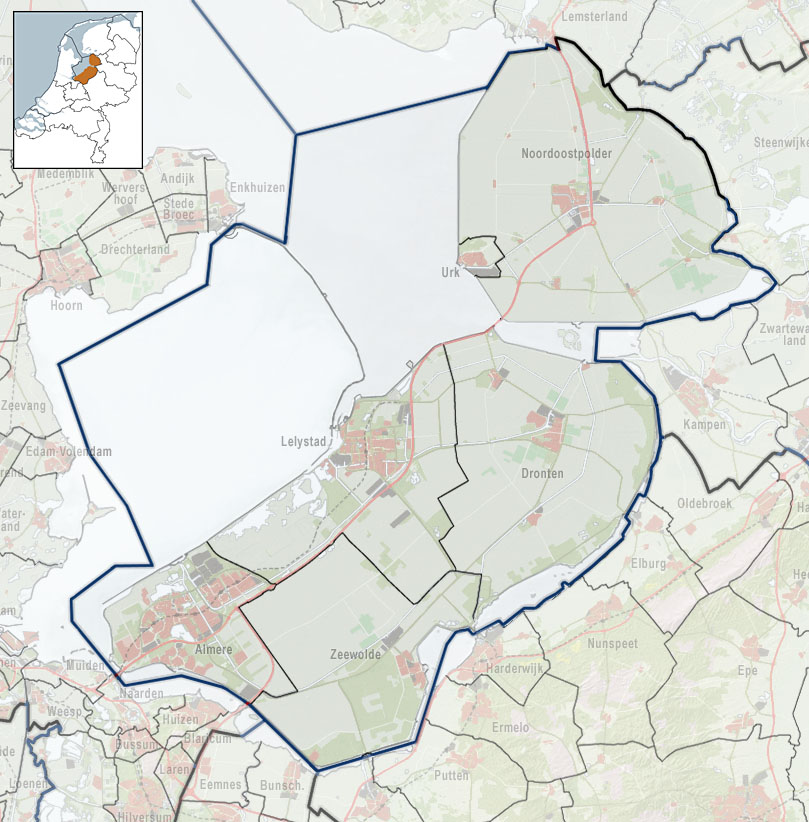
The bordering lakes of the province of Flevoland
- 1 - IJmeer
- 2 - Gooimeer
- 3 - Eemmeer
- 4 - Nijkerkernauw
- 5 - Nuldernauw
- 6 - Wolderwijd
- 7 - Veluwemeer
- 8 - Drontermeer
- 9 - Vossemeer
- 10 - Ketelmeer
- 11 - Ramsdiep
- 12 - Zwarte Meer
- 13 - Kadoelermeer
- 14 - Vollenhovermeer

In the Netherlands, the bordering lakes (in Dutch: Randmeren) are a chain of lakes which separate the Flevopolder and Noordoostpolder from the ancient lands of the provinces of Gelderland, Utrecht, Overijssel and Friesland.

Strictly speaking, these 'lakes' are not separated from each other, but are a continuous body of water between the old land and the new polder lands, consisting of lakes divided by straits, dams, locks, or in some cases just a bridge over narrow water.

The purpose of these lakes is to isolate the water management of the polder land from that of the neighbouring old land. When a polder is created, the ground level within it is below that of the surrounding area. If the polder is connected directly to the old land, the groundwater level in the old land falls, which causes the soil to dry out. This was observed in the Noordoostpolder, Overijssel and Friesland to the east and between the Wieringermeerpolder and North Holland.

In addition, water flows to the new polder lands, creating a very wet area, especially at the edges of the polder. Drainage may be a solution, but this only increases the problem in the old land. If a large enough bordering lake is created between polder and old land, the water pressure and level remain the same. Water in the polder will be managed independently by a different water authority.

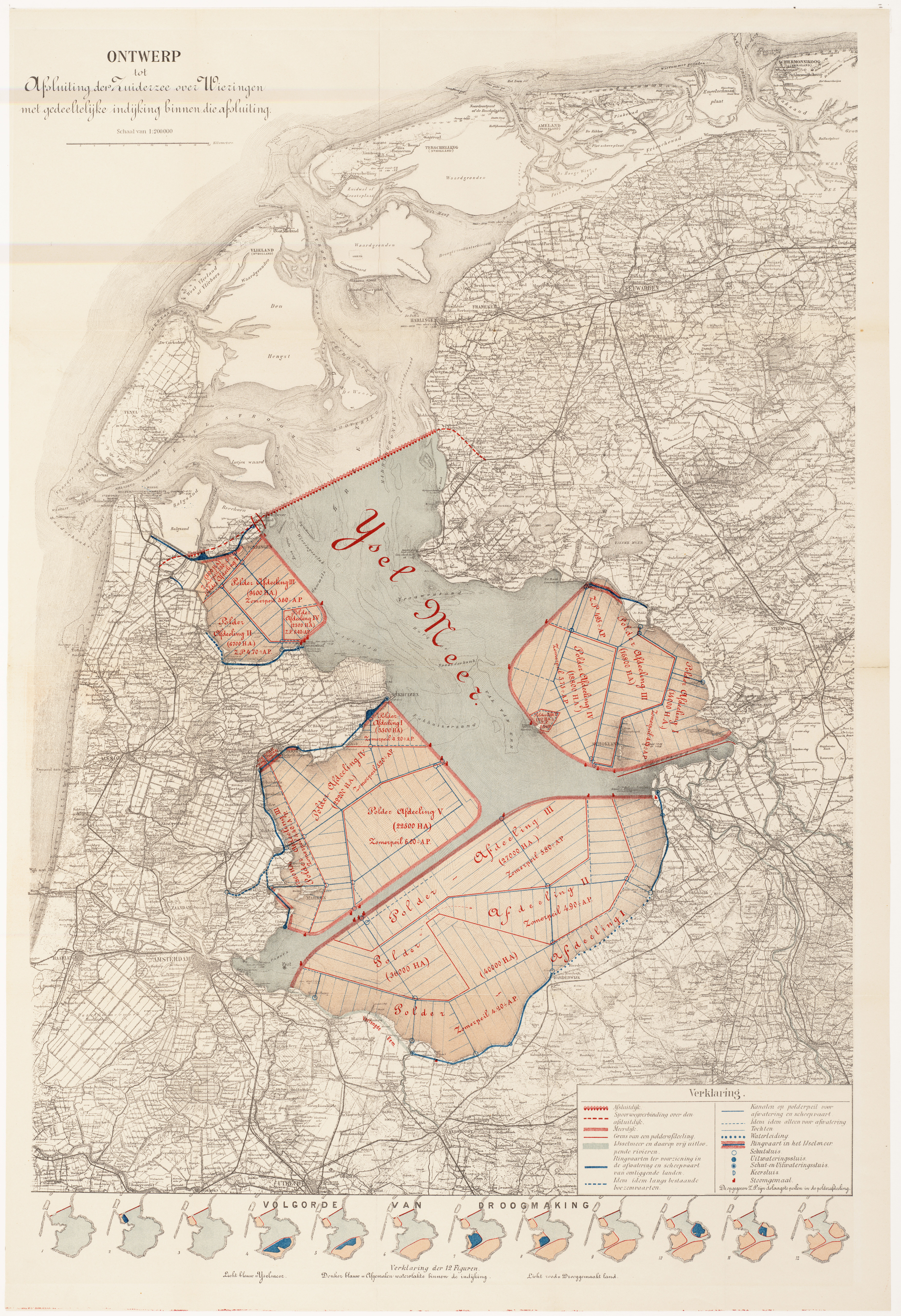
On an early project by Lely, the bordering lakes may be seen around each new polder.

Historically, this technique was not applied to the Noordoostpolder or the Wieringermeer. For the Noordoostpolder, the plan was abandoned because it was too expensive. The Wieringerrandmeer project between the Wieringermeer and Wieringen is still under discussion with the province of North Holland.

The bordering lakes surrounding the Flevopolder offer opportunities for water sports and the creation of nature reserves.

== List of the bordering lakes along the Flevopolder ==
From south-west to north:

- IJmeer
- Gooimeer
- Eemmeer
- Nijkerkernauw (straight)
- Nuldernauw (straight)
- Wolderwijd
- Veluwemeer
- Drontermeer
- Vossemeer
- Ketelmeer (separates the Flevopolder from the Noordoostpolder)

== List of bordering lakes along the Noordoostpolder ==
From south-west to north

- Zwarte Meer
- Vollenhovermeer
- Kadoelermeer
