= IJ (Amsterdam) =

Waterway and former bay in North Holland, Netherlands

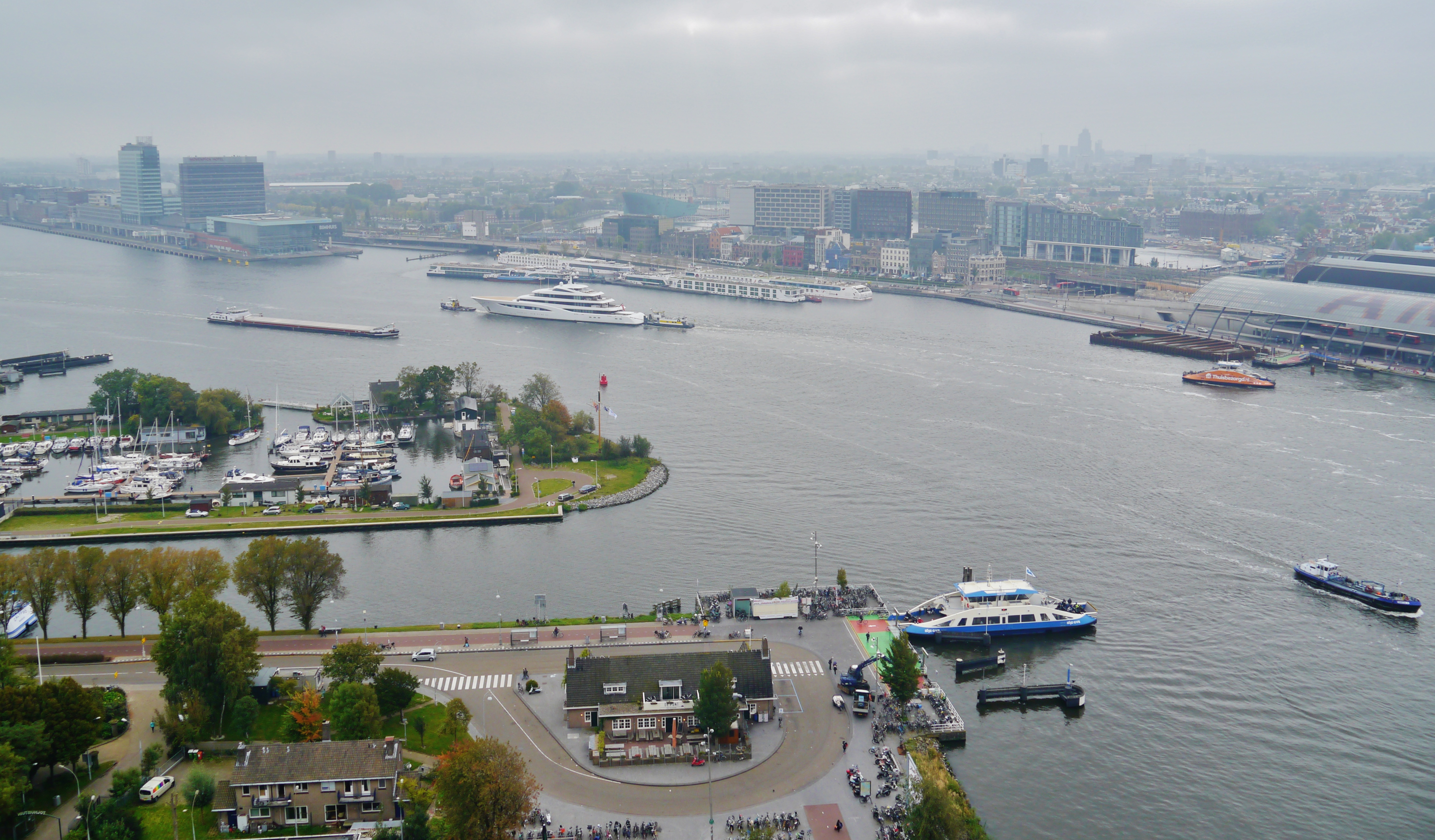
- The IJ in 2017
- Course of the IJ
- Location: Amsterdam, North Holland, Netherlands
- Coordinates: 52°22′51″N 4°56′38″E
- Type: Waterway; former bay
- Max. length: 12 km (7.5 mi)
- Max. width: 600 m (2,000 ft)
- Settlements: Amsterdam

The IJ (Dutch: [ɛi]) is a waterway in North Holland, Netherlands, running through Amsterdam between the IJmeer–Markermeer system to the east and the North Sea Canal to the west. Rijkswaterstaat gives its present length as 12 km (7.5 mi) and its width as between 150 and 600 m (490 and 1,970 ft). It forms a major part of Amsterdam's waterfront and separates the historic centre and other districts south of the water from Amsterdam-Noord.

Historically, the IJ was a much broader body of water and a bay of the Zuiderzee. Much of its western part was reclaimed during construction of the North Sea Canal in the nineteenth century, leaving the present waterway through the former bay.

== Etymology ==
The name IJ belongs to an old group of Dutch and Frisian water names. Rijkswaterstaat relates it to the (West) Frisian forms Ae and Ee, meaning "water". The Etymologisch Woordenboek van het Nederlands traces the name to an older form Ie, also written IJe.

The name is written with the Dutch digraph ij, both letters of which are capitalised at the beginning of a proper name. Older sources also used the spelling Y. A print dating from 1663–1664, for example, bears the contemporary title Amsterdam van het Y aan te sien ("Amsterdam seen from the Y").

== Geography ==
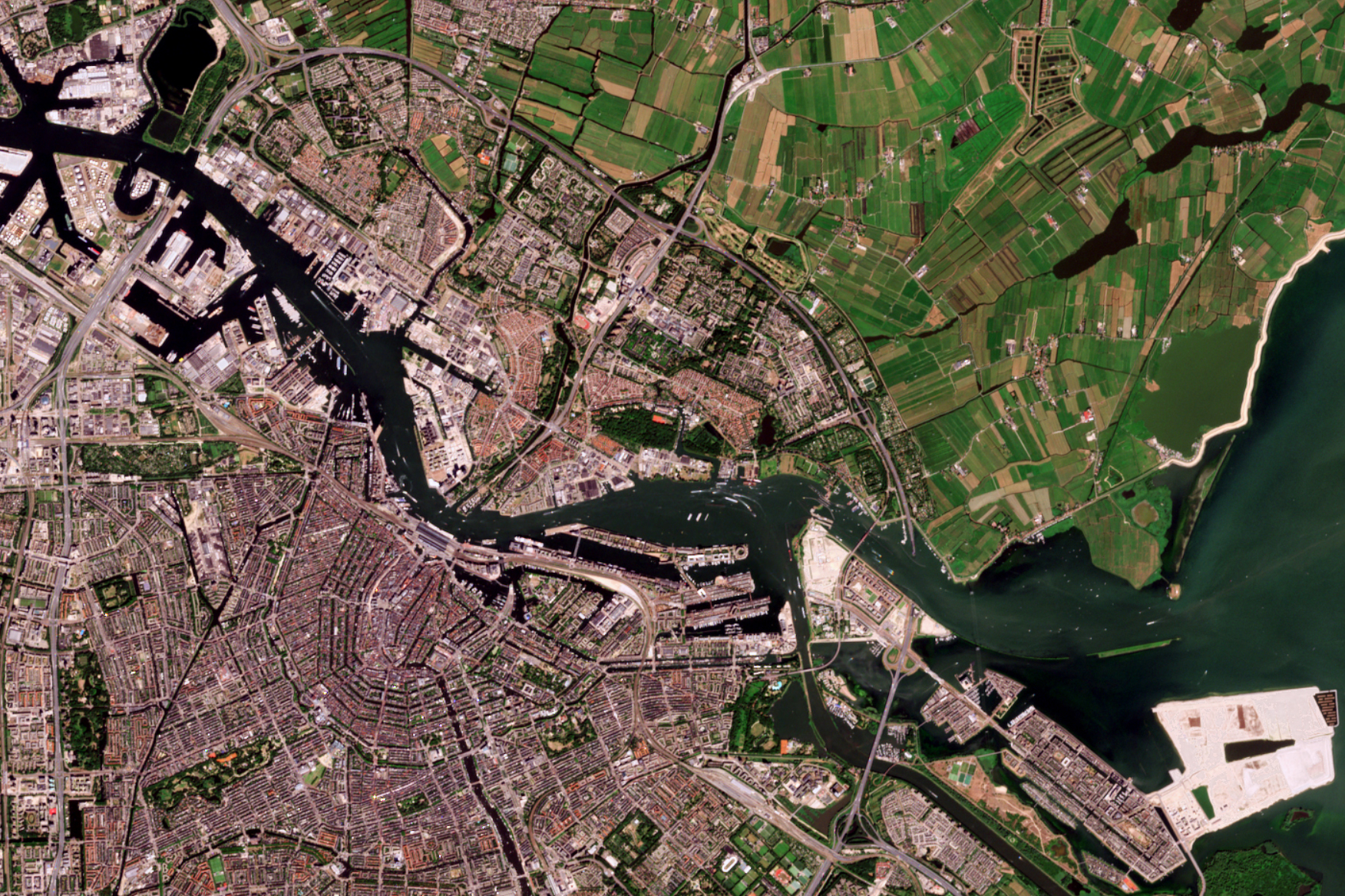
Satellite image of the IJ in 2020

The modern IJ is divided at the Oranje Locks (Oranjesluizen) into two principal sections:

- The Afgesloten IJ ("closed IJ") lies west of the locks and continues into the North Sea Canal. Although Afgesloten IJ is the official name, Rijkswaterstaat notes that Binnen-IJ ("inner IJ") is commonly used in practice. Through the North Sea Canal and the locks at IJmuiden, this section is connected to the North Sea.
- The Buiten-IJ ("outer IJ") lies east of the Oranje Locks and opens into the IJmeer, which in turn adjoins the Markermeer.

The Oranje Locks form both a navigation and water-management barrier between the two sections. They help regulate the water level of the North Sea Canal system and restrict the movement of salt water from the canal towards the IJsselmeer region.

== History ==
=== Geological formation ===
The landscape underlying the historical IJ developed from the prehistoric Oer-IJ tidal system. Palaeogeographic research places the formation of that system at about 3000 BC, following the silting of the earlier Haarlem tidal system. Its channels drained extensive peatlands in what is now North Holland.

Around 800 BC, the Oer-IJ became connected through the Utrechtse Vecht system to the Rhine and functioned as the Rhine's northernmost branch. Later changes to drainage through the Flevo lake region reduced its importance as an outlet. The tidal inlet to the North Sea progressively silted up and was closed by a coastal barrier between about 200 and 100 BC. The former channel therefore no longer had a direct North Sea connection during the Roman period.

After the inlet closed, drainage was redirected eastwards. During the Middle Ages, wave erosion and human alteration of the surrounding peatlands widened the abandoned Oer-IJ channel, producing the broader body of water historically known as the IJ. Diking of the surrounding peatlands after about 1300 limited its further expansion.

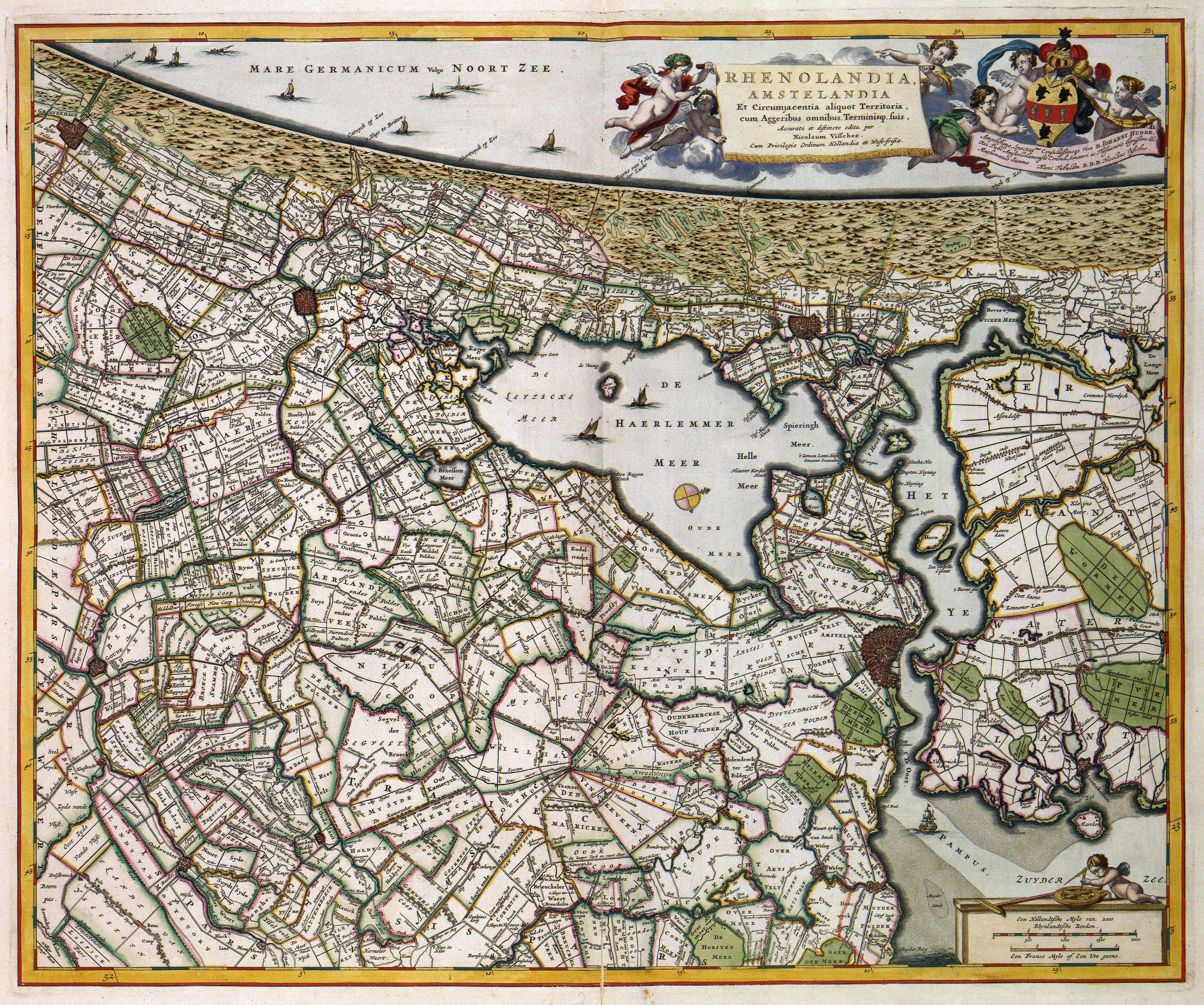
Map of 1681 showing the much wider IJ before nineteenth-century reclamation. The map is oriented with west at the top.

=== Bay and harbour ===
By the medieval and early modern periods, the IJ formed a broad bay connected eastward to the Zuiderzee and was central to Amsterdam's development as a port. Its western end extended towards Velsen, but the prehistoric North Sea inlet had long since disappeared. Seagoing traffic therefore reached Amsterdam from the North Sea by sailing through the passages into the Zuiderzee and then westwards along the IJ.

The IJ and neighbouring low-lying waters changed considerably through shoreline erosion, peat subsidence, drainage and diking. Provincial historical documentation records that dikes were constructed along the growing IJ and Wijkermeer to protect reclaimed and cultivated peatland. To the south, the expanding Haarlemmermeer was separated from the IJ by the dam at Halfweg; the growth of that lake and the effects of wave erosion threatened surrounding settlements and contributed to demands for reclamation.

Amsterdam's maritime access also became increasingly difficult as the IJ silted. By the early nineteenth century, ships had difficulty reaching the city through the shallow IJ and the circuitous Zuiderzee route. The Noordhollandsch Kanaal, completed in 1824 as an alternative connection, was itself inadequate for increasingly large vessels.

=== Reclamation and North Sea Canal ===
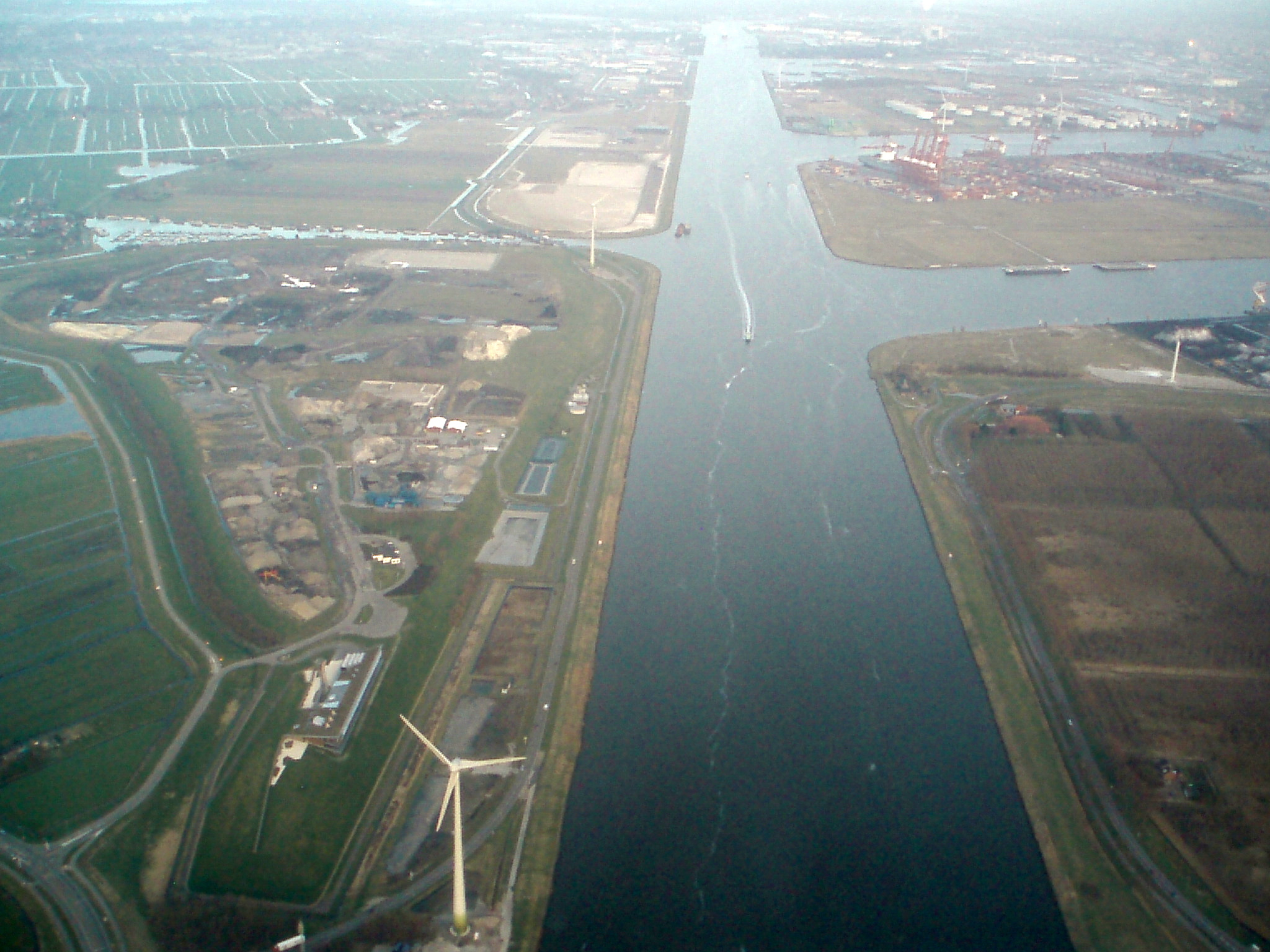
Aerial view of the North Sea Canal, 2008

The Haarlemmermeer was drained by 1852. Reclamation of the IJ and the Wijkermeer followed as part of the construction of the North Sea Canal. Work began in 1865, and the principal IJ and Wijkermeer reclamations were completed by 1872. Large areas of former open water became agricultural polders. Side canals were retained through the reclaimed land to preserve drainage and navigation links with surrounding waterways.

At the same time, a navigable channel was constructed through the former IJ basin and westwards through the coastal dunes at Velsen. The settlement of IJmuiden developed at the canal's new North Sea entrance. On 1 November 1876, King William III formally inaugurated the North Sea Canal, providing Amsterdam with a substantially shorter direct shipping route to the North Sea.

The eastern end of the system was controlled by the Oranje Locks at Schellingwoude. Rijkswaterstaat dates the hydrological separation of the Afgesloten IJ and Buiten-IJ to 1870. Its historical account of the lock complex commemorates 18 March 1872 as the date from which the original Oranje Locks are counted, six years before completion of the North Sea Canal. The distinction reflects the development of the closure works and the subsequent operation of the lock complex rather than a single date for the entire project.

The canal works also reshaped Amsterdam's waterfront. New harbour installations and warehouses were developed along the eastern waterfront. The later construction of Amsterdam Centraal required additional reclamation in the IJ. In 1876 the national government chose a waterfront location for the station; part of the IJ was filled to form its site. The station, opened in 1889, was built on three artificial islands and substantially altered the previously open relationship between the old city and the IJ.

== Crossings and transport ==
For much of Amsterdam's history, boats and ferries were the principal means of crossing the IJ. Ferries remain important for connections between the city centre and Amsterdam-Noord. GVB operates several passenger and bicycle ferry routes across the IJ free of charge. They include links from Centraal Station to Buiksloterweg, IJplein and the NDSM area, as well as other cross-IJ services.

The first major road tunnel beneath the central IJ is the IJtunnel, which connects central Amsterdam with Amsterdam-Noord. Queen Juliana opened it on 30 October 1968 after construction using immersed tunnel sections beneath the IJ.

Farther east, the A10 motorway passes beneath the Buiten-IJ through the Zeeburgertunnel. The 546 m (1,791 ft) tunnel opened in September 1990 and completed the motorway ring around Amsterdam.

Amsterdam is also planning additional fixed crossings under its Sprong over het IJ programme. The proposed Oostbrug is intended primarily for cyclists and pedestrians and would connect the Hamerkwartier in Amsterdam-Noord with Azartplein in Amsterdam-Oost. As of 2026, the landing points and final design had not yet been fixed; the municipality's programme envisages construction in 2031–2034 but states that the schedule remains subject to technical, regulatory and procedural uncertainties.

A second proposed fixed crossing, the Westbrug, is planned between the NDSM area and Danzigerkade in the Minervahaven/Haven-Stad area. The municipality envisages construction after the Oostbrug, around 2040. The project remains dependent in part on relocation of the Passenger Terminal Amsterdam cruise-ship berth, and its exact alignment has not been decided.

== Events ==
=== Olympic sailing ===
The Buiten-IJ was used as an Olympic sailing venue at both the 1920 Summer Olympics and the 1928 Summer Olympics.

At the 1920 Games, which were based in Antwerp, the 12-foot dinghy competition began at Ostend. After a dispute concerning the course, the event was completed later in the Netherlands because both remaining crews were Dutch. Its final two races were held on the Buiten-IJ near Amsterdam on 4 September 1920.

For the 1928 Amsterdam Games, the Buiten-IJ hosted the one-person dinghy competition from 2 to 8 August.

=== SAIL Amsterdam ===
The nautical festival SAIL Amsterdam is staged on and around the IJ. It was first held in 1975 as part of celebrations marking Amsterdam's 700th anniversary and, after the success of the first edition, developed into a normally five-yearly event. Tall ships, naval vessels and numerous smaller craft gather on the IJ during the event.

The tenth edition had originally been scheduled for 2020 but was cancelled because of restrictions associated with the COVID-19 pandemic. It was instead held in August 2025, coinciding with the fiftieth anniversary of SAIL and Amsterdam's 750th anniversary.

=== 2018 unexploded bomb ===
In early 2018, dredging near Java-eiland uncovered a German aerial mine from the Second World War in the IJ. The weapon, described by the Dutch Ministry of Defence as a Luftmine or Wohnblockknacker, contained approximately 600 kg (1,300 lb) of hexanite explosive. The Explosieven Opruimingsdienst Defensie rendered its firing mechanism safe, lifted the mine from the IJ and transported it through the Oranje Locks to the Markermeer, where it was detonated under controlled conditions.

== See also ==
- Amsterdam–Rhine Canal
- IJmeer
- North Sea Canal
- Port of Amsterdam
