= Veluwemeer =

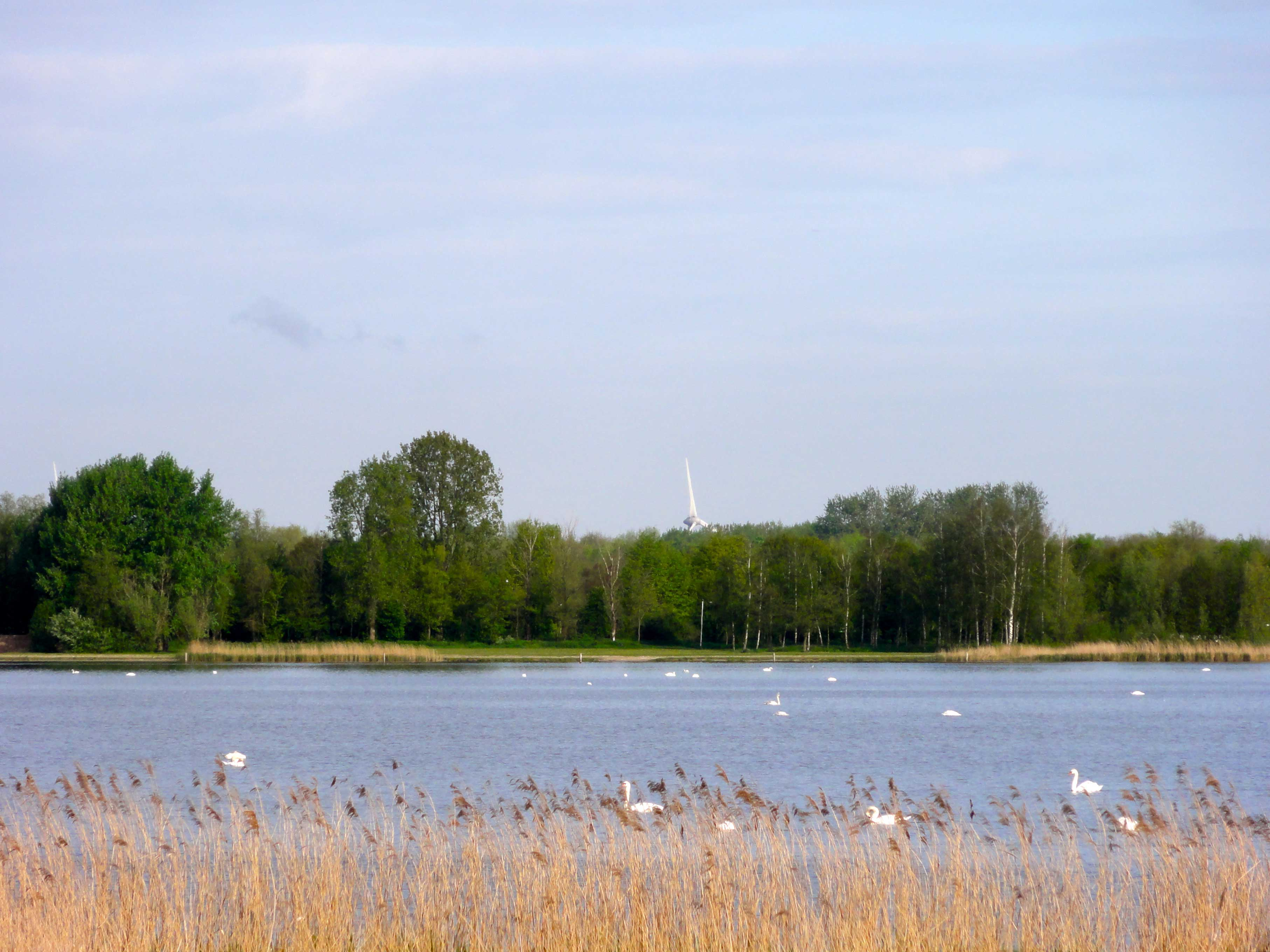

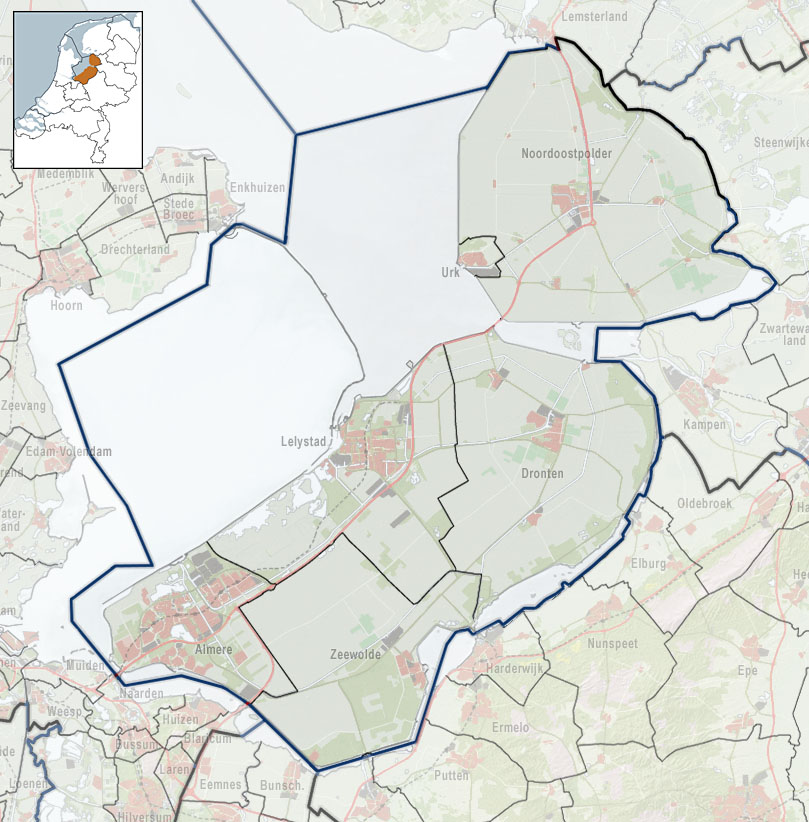
- Location in Flevoland Location in the Netherlands
- Location: Flevoland, Gelderland
- Coordinates: 52°24′32″N 5°45′0″E
- Type: bordering lake, eutrophic
- Primary inflows: Hierdense Beek and others
- Primary outflows: IJsselmeer
- Basin countries: Netherlands
- Surface area: 32.5 km^{2} (12.5 sq mi)
- Average depth: 1.55 m (5 ft 1 in)
- Max. depth: 5 m (16 ft)
- Residence time: 2 months

The Veluwemeer (Dutch) or Lake Veluwe is a bordering lake in the Netherlands, between the provinces of Flevoland on the west side and Gelderland on the east side. It is a narrow lake that stretches from south-west to north-east. South of Harderwijk the lake becomes het Wolderwijd and North of Elburg het Drontermeer.

The name of the lake comes from the Veluwe region in Gelderland of which the lake is on the western boundary. The lake is not natural and is one of several lakes known as the Randmeren formed in 1957 when the Flevopolder was created. It has a surface area of over 30 square kilometres and is fairly shallow with an average depth of 1.55 m. It is popular amongst tourists during the summer for recreation on the water or beach.

== See also ==
- List of lakes
- Bordering lakes
