= Gooimeer =

Bordering lake between North Holland and Flevoland, the Netherlands

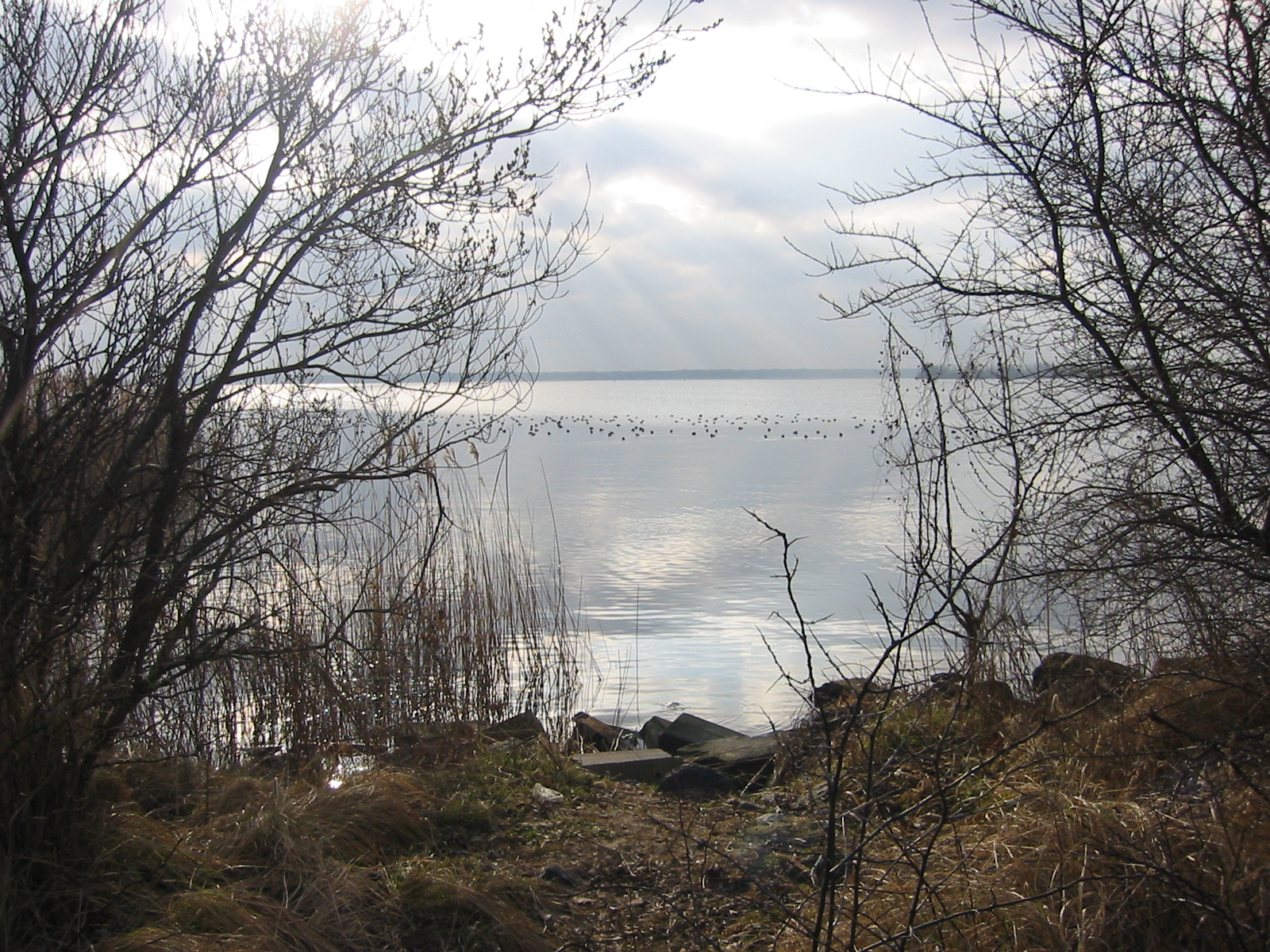

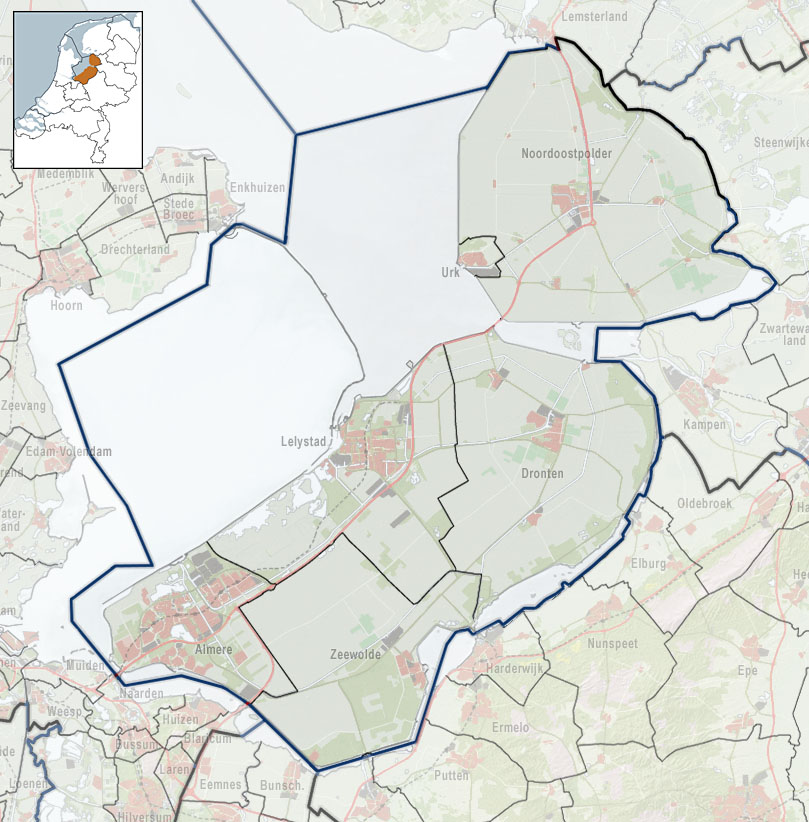
- The bordering lakes of the province of Flevoland Location within the Netherlands
- Coordinates: 52°19′22″N 5°11′45″E
- Type: bordering lake, eutrophic
- Basin countries: Netherlands
- Surface area: 26.70 km^{2} (10.31 sq mi)
- Settlements: Huizen

The Gooimeer (Gooi Lake) is a bordering lake in the Netherlands between the southeastern part of North Holland (the Gooi) and Flevoland.

There is a railroad bridge over the narrow west side, between Weesp and Almere Poort, with a parallel highway bridge, the Hollandse Brug. The narrow eastern border of the lake is crossed by two parallel highway bridges.

On the south bank of Gooimeer, which used to be the IJsselmeer, before the creation of the new polder Flevoland, the old cities of Naarden and Huizen can be found. The Naarderwoonbos, part of the Naarderbos, was built in the eighties. It is situated directly adjacent to the southern shore of the Gooimeer.

The Gooimeer is related to the crash of El Al Flight 1862 in 1992, as the two right-hand side jet engines of the Boeing 747-200F serving the route separated from the plane and fell into the lake, witnessed by a fishing off-duty police officer. The plane suffered serious damage to its right wing after losing its engines, and later continued on for eight minutes until it crashed into the Bijlmermeer apartment complex, killing all four of the plane's occupants and also several residents inside the building.

See also the maps at Zuiderzee Works and bordering lakes.

== See also ==
- Bordering lakes
