= Stelling Den Oever =

1930s Dutch fortification on the Afsluitdijk

The farthest island was the First Defense Line, while the island in the foreground was the Second Line.

Stelling Den Oever, ("Den Oever Position"), is a Dutch fortification located near the town of Den Oever, The Netherlands. Stelling Den Oever guards the strategic dam of Afsluitdijk, which stretches over the Zuiderzee. The Afsluitdijk Dam stretches between the towns of Den Oever and Kornwerderzand, a distance of over 32 km (20 mi). When the dam was planned in the 1920s, the Dutch Ministry of Defence demanded that the dam be guarded by fortifications. Their reasoning was that the construction of the dam would allow ground forces in northern Holland to attack the navy’s main base at Den Helder, only 25 km (16 mi) from Den Oever. The first fortifications were located on a triangle-shaped artificial island a few kilometres from the town of Den Oever on the southern side of the Afsluitdijk Dam. Two defensive positions were constructed, one on the eastern side of the dam, Stelling Kornwerderzand, which was equipped with trenches and bunkers. The other was Stelling Den Oever, located on the western side of the dam. The positions of Den Oever were constructed between 1932 and 1936. There were 13 fortified positions of Stelling Den Oever. These positions were manned by 7 officers and 211 enlisted men.

== First line of defence ==
=== Machine Gun Bunker I ===
Machine Gun Bunker I was constructed in 1933, and is armed with a single machine gun facing north. The bunker was quite large when compared to other bunkers of the time. MG Bunker I is the farthest forward of and manned position in Stelling Den Oever. The entrance to the bunker was guarded by small embrasures in which small arms could be fired out of. The wall thickness was 2.3m and the roof thickness was 2m, all made out of reinforced concrete. Camouflage has been added in the years since World War II, making the bunker look like it would have in 1939. Since Bunker I was constructed on an artificial island, it didn’t have an underground portion because it was below the water table.

=== MG Bunker II ===
MG Bunker II was constructed in 1933, and is armed with a single machine gun facing north. The bunker is almost the exact same as MG Bunker I, except it has only 1.8m of reinforced concrete that make up the walls.

=== Casemate III ===
Casemate III was built in 1933, and is located “behind” and “left” of MG Bunker I. Casemate III was armed with a single 5cm Siderius anti-tank gun in a casemate facing north. The bunker is mostly surrounded by dirt as a protection. The walls were 2.3m thick and the roof was 1.6m thick, and the bunker was constructed out of reinforced concrete. The bunker measures 13m x 21m The entrance was guarded by small-arms embrasures. Inside, the left passage led to the gun and the right to the ammunition store. Located on the opposite side of the bunker as the gun, was an observation station with a periscope to protect the observer from enemy fire.

=== Casemate IV ===
Casemate IV is located directly across from Casemate III, and is “behind” and “right” of MG Bunker II. Casemate IV was armed with 2 5cm anti-tank guns facing north, and is the largest fortification of the Den Oever Redoubt. The bunker was constructed with 2 levels, 1 below ground and 1 at ground level. The upper floor houses the anti-tank guns and a periscope for safe observation. Within the area that housed the periscope was a fire control room, which regulated and spotted for the guns. The walls on the northeastern side were 4.5m thick, while the walls facing towards Den Oever were only 1.8m thick. The roof was 1.8m thick and the structure measured 13m x 26m.

=== MG and Spotlight Bunker V ===
Bunker V is a combined machine gun and spotlight bunker, and is located “behind” and to the “left” of Casemate III. The bunker is located on the northwestern corner of the triangle-shaped man-made island. The Schwarzlose machine gun is located on the left side of the bunker, and behind the firing station is an embrasure that guards 1 of the entrances to the bunker. The other entrance is guarded by an embrasure located in the barracks room. Bunker V has a brick kitchen that is covered by a 30cm thick concrete slab to protect the room. Access to the cast iron observation turret is located next to the machine gun. The spotlight located within the bunker was a special type, as the spotlight was not located outside or in a casemate. Rather the spotlight was allocated its own room, where a series of mirrors reflected the light up to a rotating mirror on the roof. The design idea was that if the enemy shot the mirror, they would be shooting a less expensive thing than a spotlight. In a room next to the spotlight was a generator that regulated how much power the spotlight used.

=== MG and Spotlight Bunker VI ===
Bunker VI is a combined machine gun and spotlight bunker, and is located “behind” and to the “right” of Casemate IV. The bunker is a mirror reflection of Bunker V. The bunker is located on the southeastern corner of the triangle-shaped man-made island. The Schwarzlose machine gun is located on the right side of the bunker, and behind the firing station is an embrasure that guards 1 of the entrances to the bunker. The other entrance is guarded by an embrasure located in the barracks room. Access to the cast iron observation turret is located next to the machine gun. The spotlight located within the bunker was a special type, as the spotlight was not located outside or in a casemate. Rather the spotlight was allocated its own room, where a series of mirrors reflected the light up to a rotating mirror on the roof. The design idea was that if the enemy shot the mirror, they would be shooting a less expensive thing than a spotlight. In a room next to the spotlight was a generator that regulated how much power the spotlight used.

=== Bunker VII ===
Bunker VII is located “behind” MG Bunker I, and is not armed with any fixed weapons. Rather, Bunker VII was armed with 2 Oerlikon 20 mm anti-aircraft guns that were housed inside the bunker. The guns could be wheeled out via earthen ramps into pre-prepared firing positions. The bunker has 3 entrances, 1 on each side of the rear of the bunker, and 1 from the center rear of the bunker that leads straight into a central area. The 2 regular entrances were guarded by embrasures located in the 2 barracks rooms. The 2 regular entrances could be closed in an instant by 2 steel doors; these entrances were also where the anti-aircraft guns were wheeled out during an air raid. On top of the left side of the bunker was a cast iron observation turret that provided firing data for the guns. The bunker measures 15 x 20m and the walls are 1.8m thick and the roof is 2m thick, all reinforced concrete.

=== MG Casemate VIII ===
The rear where Casemate VIII was accessed.

Casemate VIII is a roughly square bunker located “behind” Bunker II. The bunker was built in 1933, and is one of the largest Dutch bunkers in Den Oever. Much of the bunker is surrounded or topped with dirt, with only the front and part of the rear exposed. The bunker is much like Bunkers I and II but Bunker VIII contains a telephone exchange and a steel observation dome. The Schwarzlose M.08/15 machine gun is located on the left side of the bunker, and the steel observation dome sits above and to the right of the embrasure, providing the gunner with spotting info. The bunker measures 15 x 16m, the walls are 2.4m thick in the front and 1.7m on the sides and back. The roof is 2m thick, and the whole bunker is constructed out of reinforced concrete. Today, the bunker is nearly impossible to visit because of the highway in such close proximity.

=== Stationary Anti-Tank Defenses ===
Located in front of the 1st line of defense was 190m of concrete anti-tank obstacles. Today, only 30m of anti-tank obstacles remain.

== Second line of defence ==
The second line of defense was located closer to Den Oever on an artificial island that controlled the flood gates.

=== MG Bunker IX ===
MG Bunker IX is located just a little bit Northwest of the flood gates, and most of its armament faces Northeast. The bunker is armed with 3 machine guns in casemates, with 2 facing towards the first line of defense and 1 facing towards Den Oever. Around the bunker was a reinforced concrete parapet where the machine guns could be moved for defense outside the bunker. The 2 entrances, which were located in the rear, could be closed by thick steel doors. Located inside the frontal machine gun rooms was a small embrasure which covered the entrances with small-arms fire. 1 machine gun faced towards the seaward side of the dam, 1 faced the road leading across the dam, and the last machine gun faced towards Den Oever. The sides of the bunker were rounded so there was a higher chance of enemy shells being deflected.

=== MG Bunker X ===
The rear of MG Casemate X.

The bunker is the exact same as MG Bunker IX but is located on the opposite side of the road. 1 machine gun guarded the lake side of the dam, 1 guarded the road leading across the dam, and 1 faced towards Den Oever. The bunker has been completely sealed off so no one can enter.

=== Anti-Aircraft Bunker XI ===
Anti-Aircraft Bunker XI was built south of MG Bunker IX, and is just across the road from it. The 3 20mm Oerlikon Anti-Aircraft Guns were supposed to be stored inside but could be moved outside in pre-prepared concrete positions. The guns were never delivered because the Netherlands ordered them too late. The bunker has 3 entrances, 1 on each side of the rear of the bunker, and 1 from the center rear of the bunker that leads straight into a central area. The 2 regular entrances were guarded by embrasures located in the 2 barracks rooms. The 2 regular entrances could be closed in an instant by 2 steel doors; these entrances were also where the anti-aircraft guns were wheeled out during an air raid. On top of the left side of the bunker was a cast iron observation turret that provided firing data for the guns. The bunker measures 15 x 20m and the walls are 1.8m thick and the roof is 2m thick, all reinforced concrete. The Germans built a concrete foundation next to the bunker which housed a French tank turret. The bunker was incorporated into the Atlantikwall during the German occupation. In 2020, ⅓ of the bunker was recently demolished so that a new pump station could be built. The other ⅔ of the bunker has been preserved because it is a protected site.

=== MG Bunker XII ===
MG Bunker XII is located near the quay on the lake side of the dam. Unlike the other MG Bunkers, Bunker XII is not covered by earth as protection since the concrete is thicker. The bunker is surrounded by a concrete parapet just like Bunker IX, and has a covered machine gun post. On the southwestern side of the bunker was 2 entrances with steel doors, behind which were two small-arms embrasures, 1 originating in the machine gun room and the other from the barracks area. The bunker was armed with 2 machine guns, 1 in a casemate facing towards the access road, and the outside MG post facing Northeast. The bunker was equipped with a telephone exchange that connected the bunker of the 2nd defensive line. The frontal wall is 2.3m while the side and rear walls are 1.8m thick. The roof is 2.3m, and the whole bunker was constructed out of reinforced concrete. The interior has been severely damaged by fire.

=== Aid Bunker XIII ===
Underneath that tower is Bunker XIII.

Aid Bunker XIII is located on the north-westernmost quay, and is entirely underground. The bunker was not equipped with any fixed guns and was only defended by 2 small-arms embrasures. Room I was an infirmary and doctors office for the defenders and contained a small-arms embrasure that defended 1 of the entrances. Room II was a barracks room for the crew of the bunker. Room III was for a generator that ran some spotlights and the bunker’s lights. This bunker is also sometimes called Generator Bunker F because of this room. The bunker included its own fuel storage room for the generator. The bunker could be accessed via a staircase up to ground level or a ladder directly up to the surface.

=== Generator Bunkers ===
A Kromhout-Gardner Diesel Engine like the ones used in the Generator Bunkers of Stelling Den Oever.

6 bunkers were built to power the defenses of Den Oever. Each one was the same and was unarmed. The fuel was stored below the generator for easy access.

Generator Bunker A: Located between Bunkers I and VII. The bunker contained a 12hp Kromhout-Gardner diesel engine that offered a DC current. The walls were 1.5m thick, and the bunker measures 5.2m x 3.5m.

Generator Bunker B: Located in between Bunkers VI and VIII. The bunker contained a 12hp Kromhout-Gardner diesel engine that offered a DC current. The walls were 1.5m thick, and the bunker measures 5.2m x 3.5m.

Generator Bunker C: Located between Bunkers II and III, right where highway A7 runs today. The bunker contained a 12hp Kromhout-Gardner diesel engine that offered a DC current. The walls were 1.5m thick, and the bunker measures 5.2m x 3.5m.

Generator Bunker D: Located between Bunkers II and VIII. The bunker is a protected monument, and has the ID number 510379. The bunker was identical to all other generator buildings.

Generator Bunker E: The bunker was built next to Generator Bunker D. The bunker is the exact same as every other generator bunker.
