= Den Oever Lighthouse =

Den Oever Lighthouse Wieringen
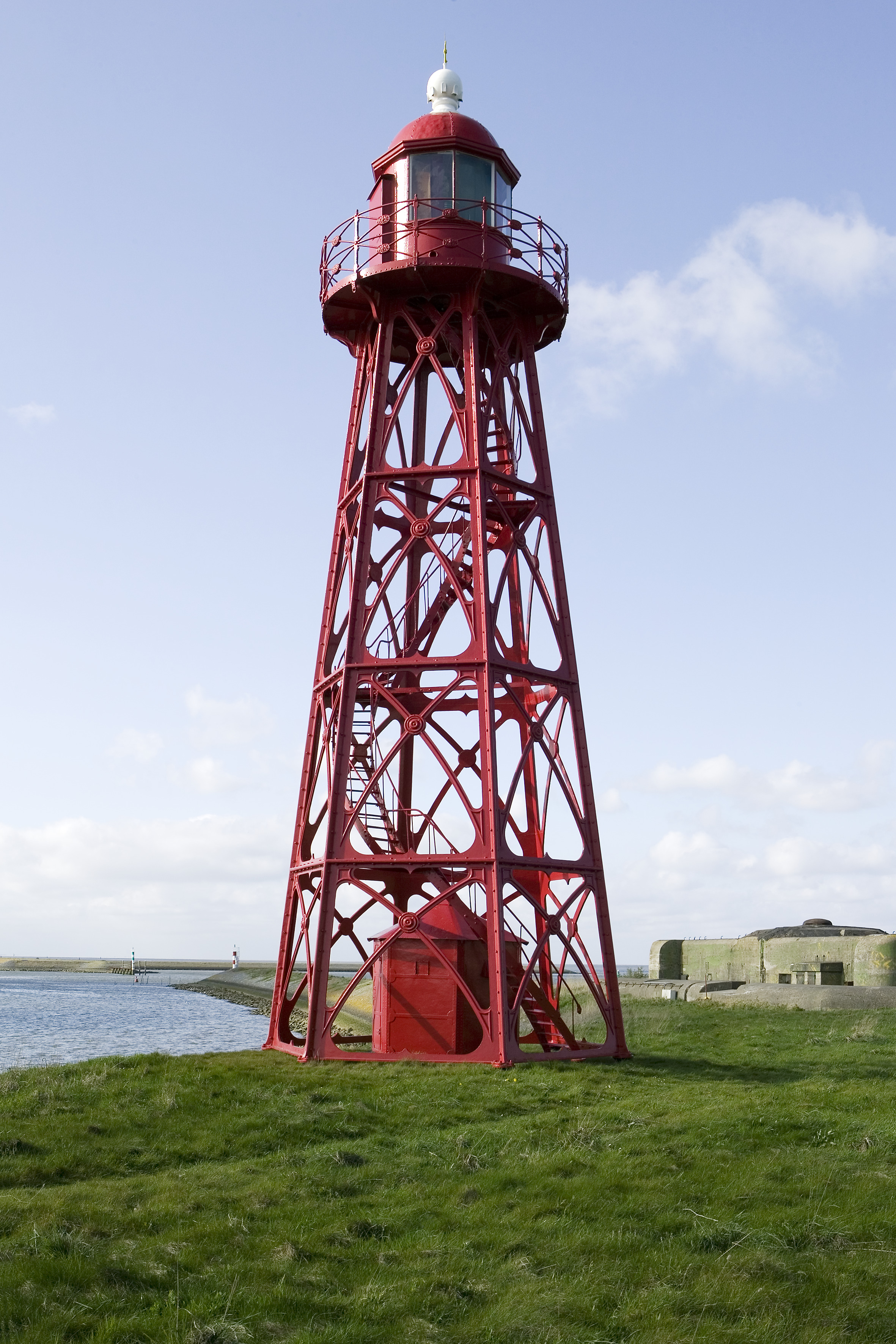
- Den Oever Lighthouse
- Location: Den Oever; Netherlands
- Coordinates: 52°56′07.2″N 5°02′32.0″E

Tower
- Constructed: 1885
- Construction: cast iron skeletal tower
- Height: 16 metres (52 ft)
- Shape: hexagonal pyramidal tower with balcony and lantern
- Markings: red tower and lantern, white ball on top of lantern
- Heritage: Rijksmonument

Light
- First lit: 1930
- Deactivated: 2009
- Focal height: 15 metres (49 ft)
- Intensity: 1,300 cd
- Range: white: 10 nautical miles (19 km) red: 7 nautical miles (13 km) green: 7 nautical miles (13 km)
- Characteristic: Iso WRG 5s.
- Netherlands no.: 2064

The Den Oever Lighthouse is a cast iron lighthouse in Den Oever, the Netherlands, on the Wadden Sea. Erected in 1885, it was originally located at the western end of the former island of Wieringen where it served as the rear light of a pair of leading lights. In 1930, when the Afsluitdijk was finished, the tower was relocated to the eastern end of Wieringen at Den Oever. While the light was first directed the Wadden Sea, it was moved southward in 1932 and turned to face the IJsselmeer. It was deactivated in 2009.

A previous lighthouse in Den Oever was established in 1918. It was moved to Zeughoek in 1930.

== See also ==
- List of lighthouses in the Netherlands
- Penn & Bauduin, The fabricators/constructors of the lighthouse
