= Christiaan Boers =

Dutch resistance member

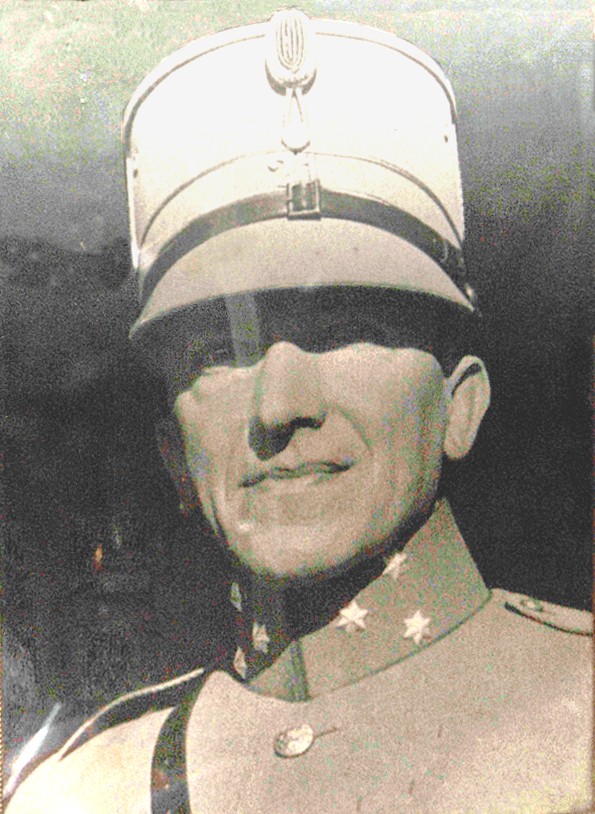
- Boers c. 1940
- Born: Christianus Franciscus Johannes Boers; 24 October 1889; The Hague, Netherlands
- Died: 3 May 1942 (aged 52); Sachsenhausen, Germany
- Military career
- Allegiance: Netherlands
- Branch: Royal Netherlands Army
- Rank: Captain
- Battles: World War II; Battle of the Netherlands; Battle of the Afsluitdijk
- Awards: Bronze cross

Christianus Franciscus Johannes Boers (24 October 1889 – 3 May 1942) was a captain in the Royal Netherlands Army during World War II who scored one of the few Allied victories during the German invasion of the Netherlands, by rallying his men in holding off and pushing back the German attackers during the Battle of the Afsluitdijk, fought from 12 to 14 May 1940.

After the capitulation of Dutch forces on 15 May, Boers joined the Dutch resistance and the Ordedienst, an illegal organization set up to preserve order once the Germans were defeated and had been driven from the country. The organization was led almost entirely by ex-army officers, but had been infiltrated by a German informant. Subsequently, Boers and other members were arrested over the spring and summer of 1941. After a mass trial, Boers was executed at Sachsenhausen concentration camp in 1942.

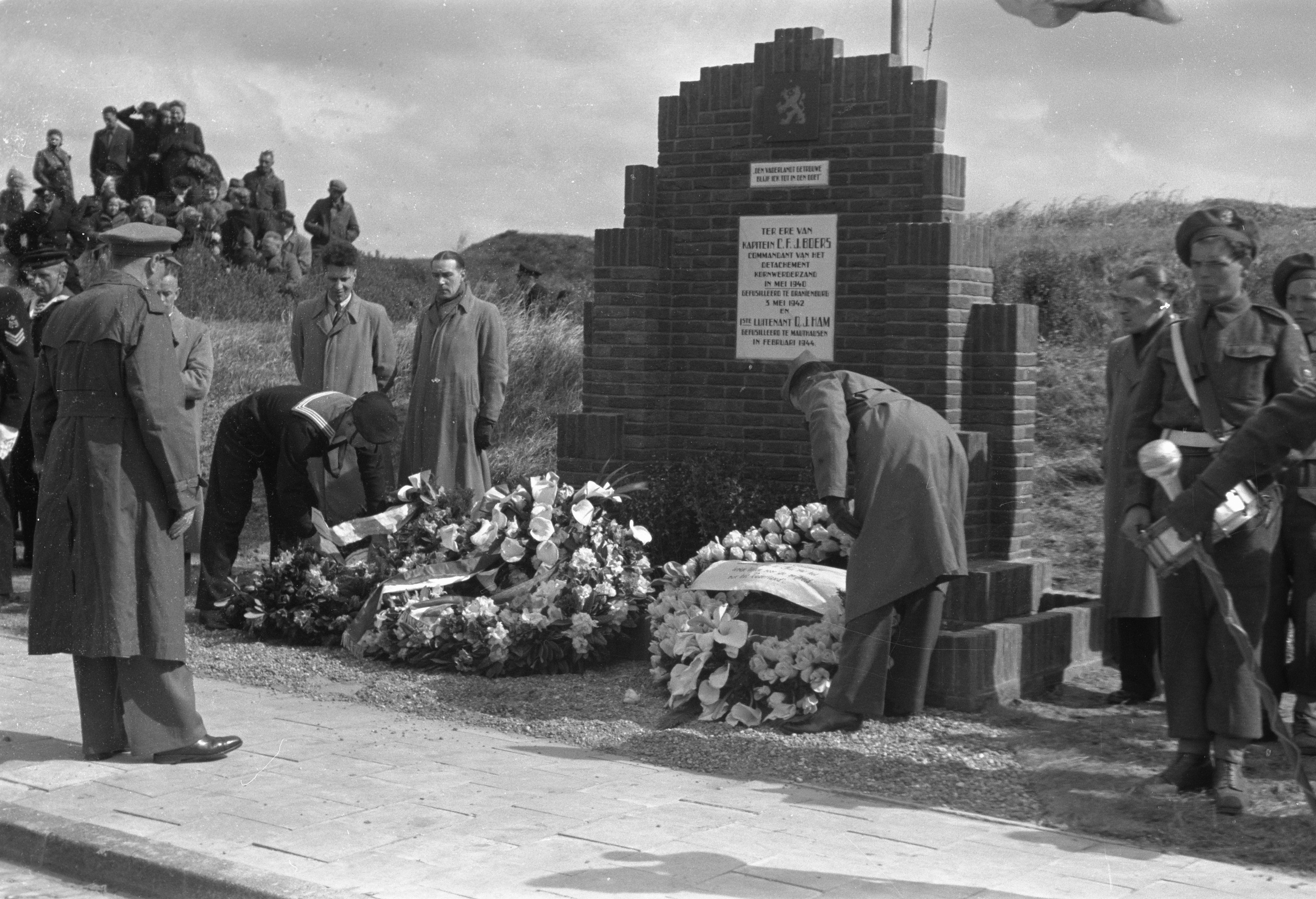
Unveiling of the monument, 17 May 1946

Boers is often described as a "professional officer" and a "natural leader" by modern Dutch historiography, being one of only a few successful Dutch military commanders during the German invasion. Boers was posthumously awarded the Bronze Cross on 9 May 1946, for his actions as commander of Fort Kornwerderzand. Close to the fort, a monument was dedicated to Boers' memory, later the same month. In June 2005, the Kornwerderzand viaduct was renamed the Captain Boers Viaduct, the sign being unveiled by Boers' son and grandson.
