= Den Oever =

- Village
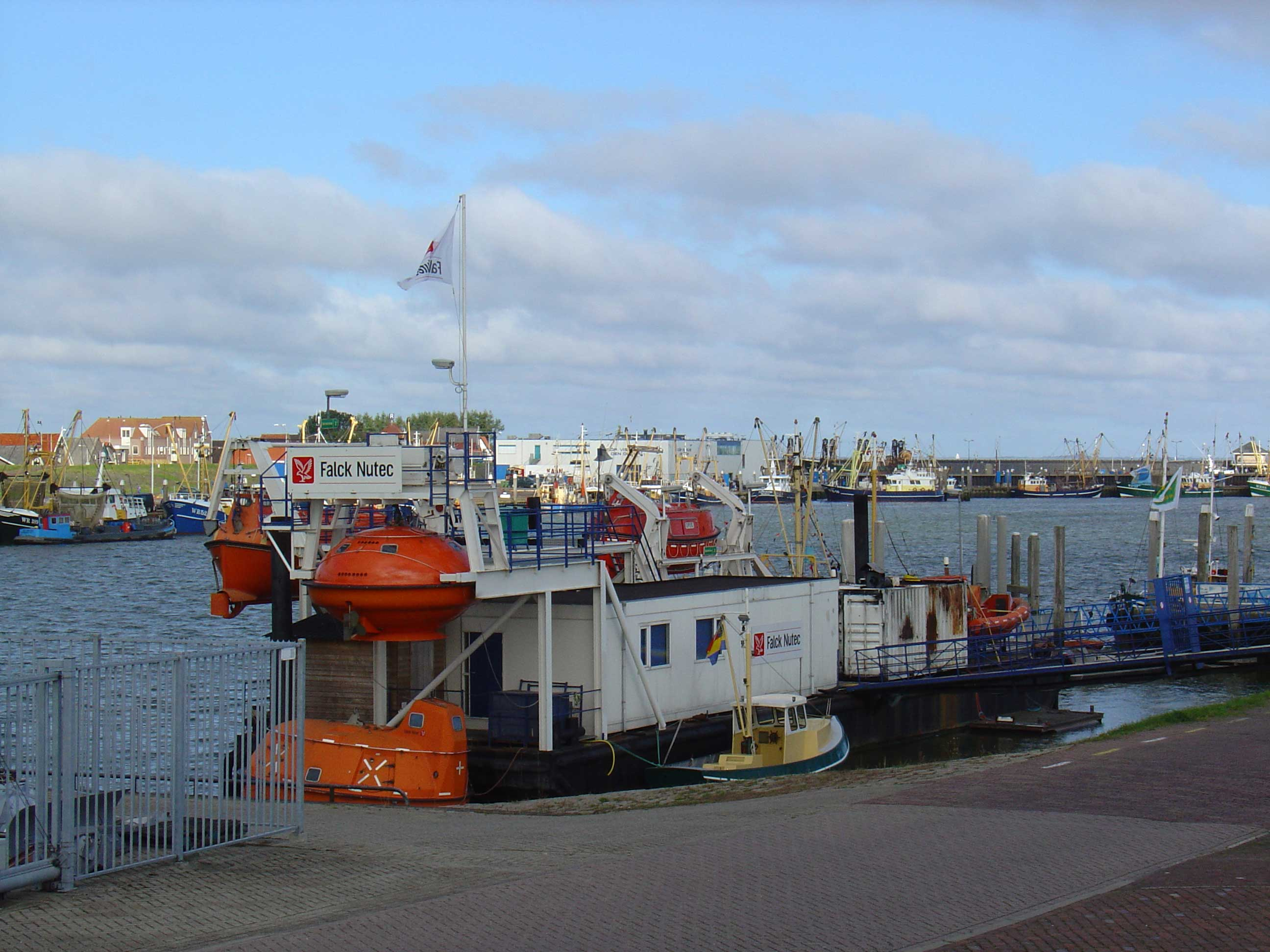
- Harbour of Den Oever

- Location in the Netherlands Location in the province of North Holland in the Netherlands
- Coordinates: 52°56′N 5°2′E
- Country: Netherlands
- Province: North Holland
- Municipality: Hollands Kroon

Area
  - Village: 5.50 km^{2} (2.12 sq mi)
- Elevation: 1.6 m (5.2 ft)

Population (2025)
  - Village: 2,230
  - Density: 405/km^{2} (1,050/sq mi)
  - Urban: 2,145
  - Rural: 85
- Time zone: UTC+1 (CET)
  - Summer (DST): UTC+2 (CEST)
- Postal code: 1779
- Dialing code: 0227

Den Oever (Dutch pronunciation: [dɛn ˈuvər]; in English, the shore, the coast) is a village in the Dutch province of North Holland. It is a part of the municipality of Hollands Kroon, and lies about 18 kilometres (11 mi) east of Den Helder.

== Overview ==
The village was first mentioned in 1432 as "ten Oisterlande op 't Oever", and means "(on the sea) shore", because it was an access point to the former Zuiderzee. Den Oever was a fishing village which developed in the Late Middle Ages on the north-eastern edge of the former Wieringen island.

The village is located on the former island Wieringen at the west side of the Afsluitdijk: therefore the Stevin lock (named after mathematician and engineer Simon Stevin) and three series of five sluices for discharging the IJsselmeer into the Wadden Sea were constructed in Den Oever.

The eight-sided wooden grain smock mill "De Hoop" ("The Hope") is situated in the middle of the village with a wingspan of 17 metres (56 ft). It dates back into the 17th century (1654) and has been completely restored in the second half of the 20th century (1960, e.g. iron wingstocks, metal cap rolls for the wheeling or winding (cap rotating) mechanism from a Gelderland mill, new cast-iron windshaft etc.). Unusually, the mill has never had had a hoist mechanism.

The monument on the Afsluitdijk was built in 1933 on the location where the last hole was filled up on 28 May 1932. The monument was designed by Willem Marinus Dudok.

== Gallery ==
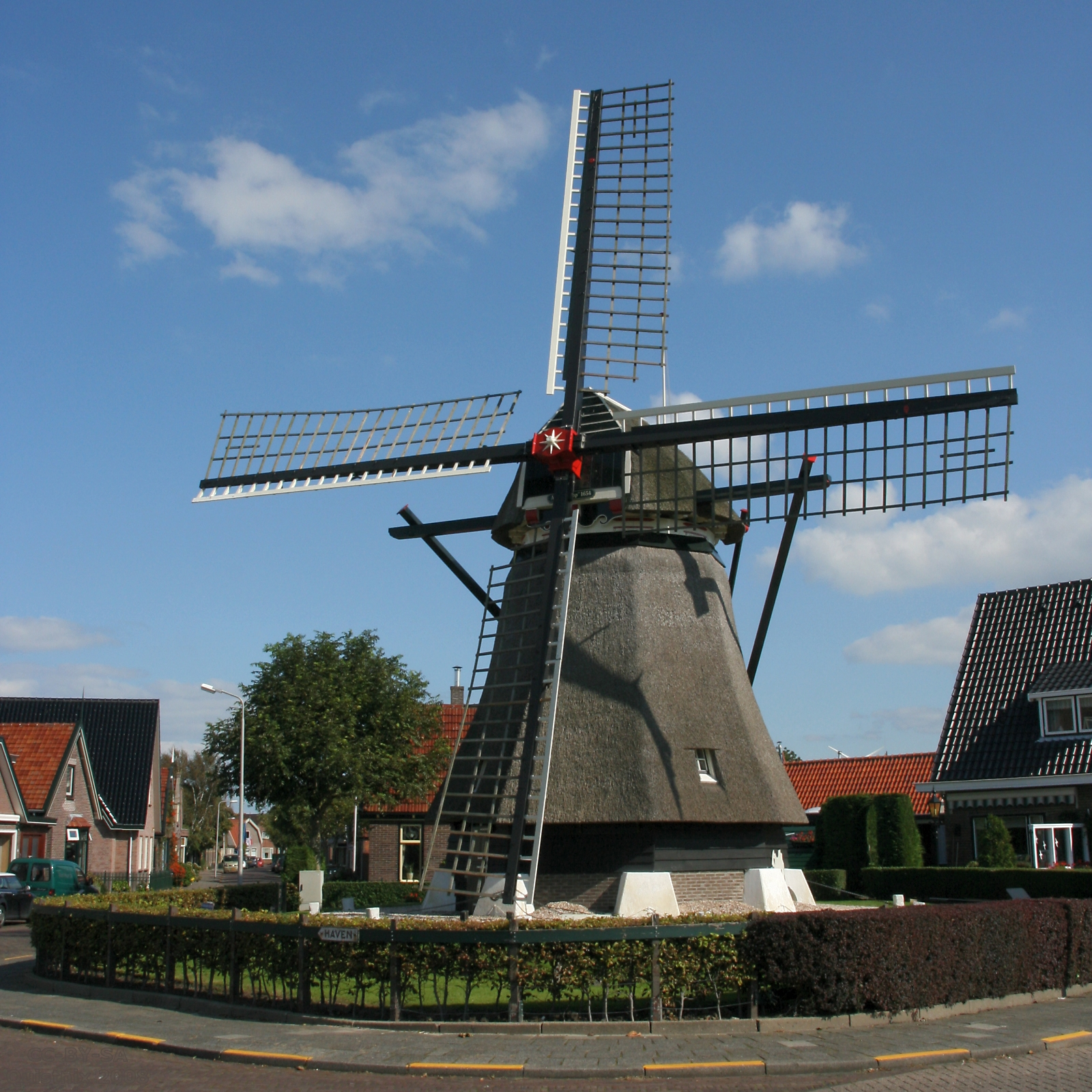
"De Hoop" mill

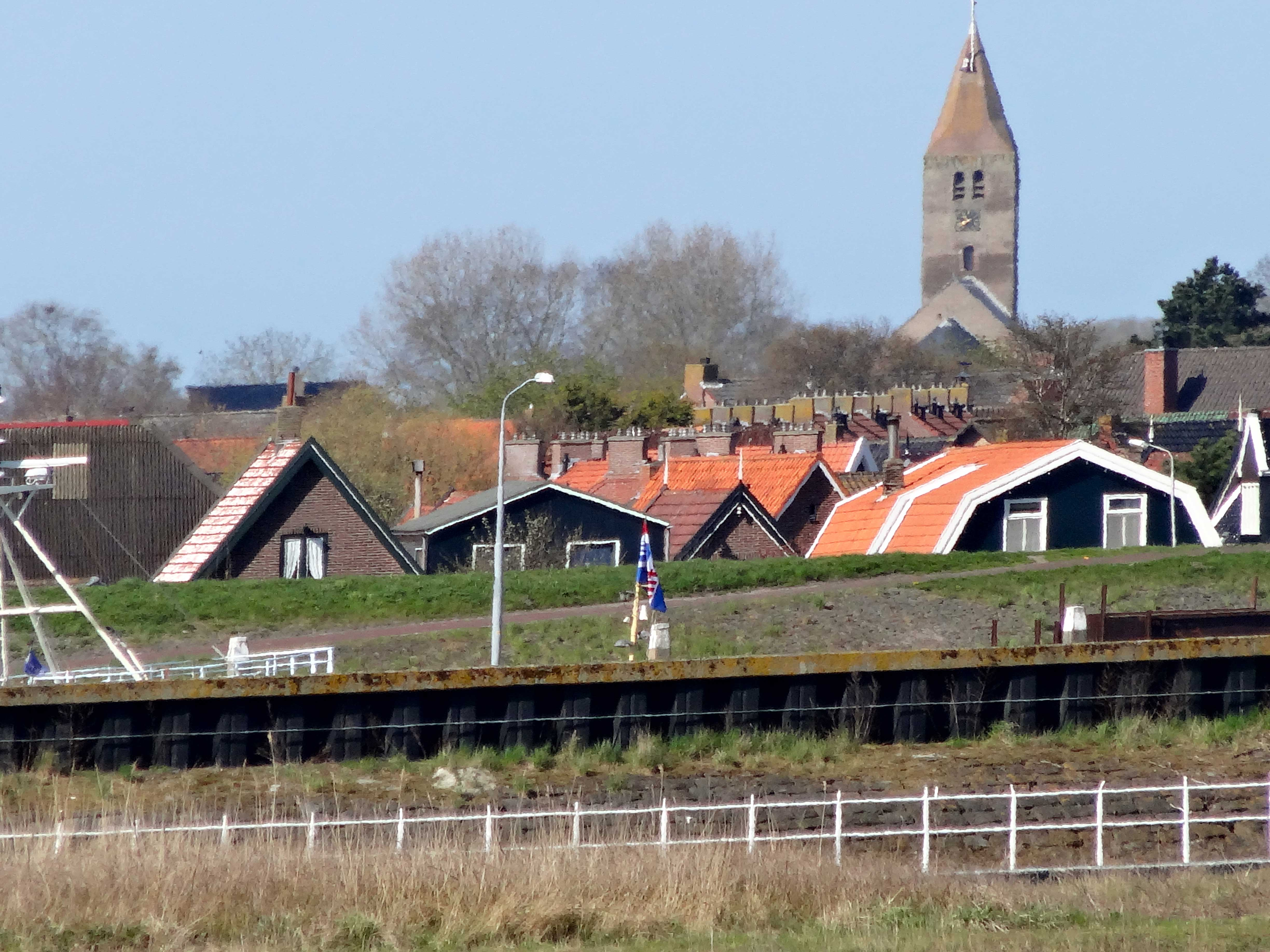
View on Den Oever

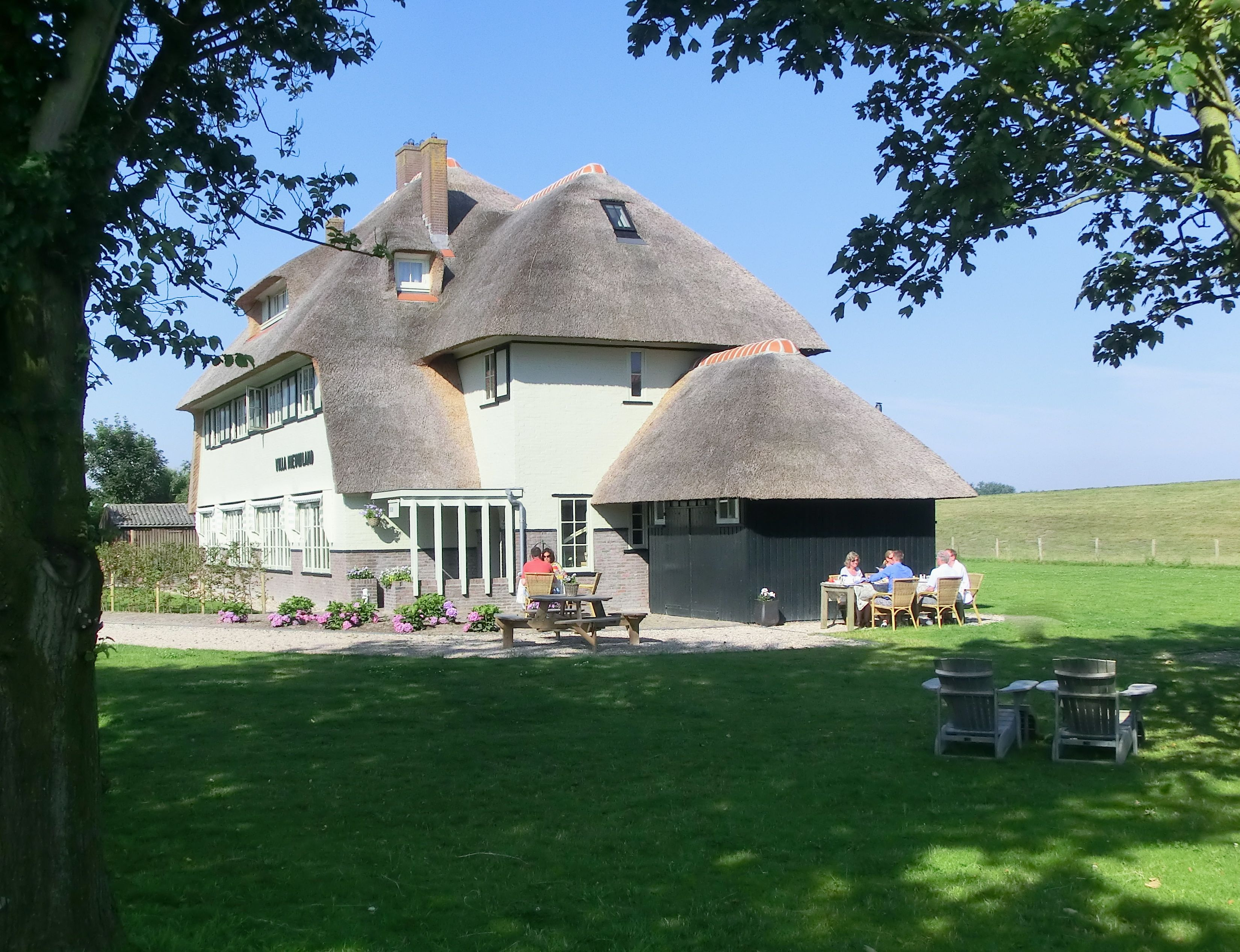
Villa Nieuwland

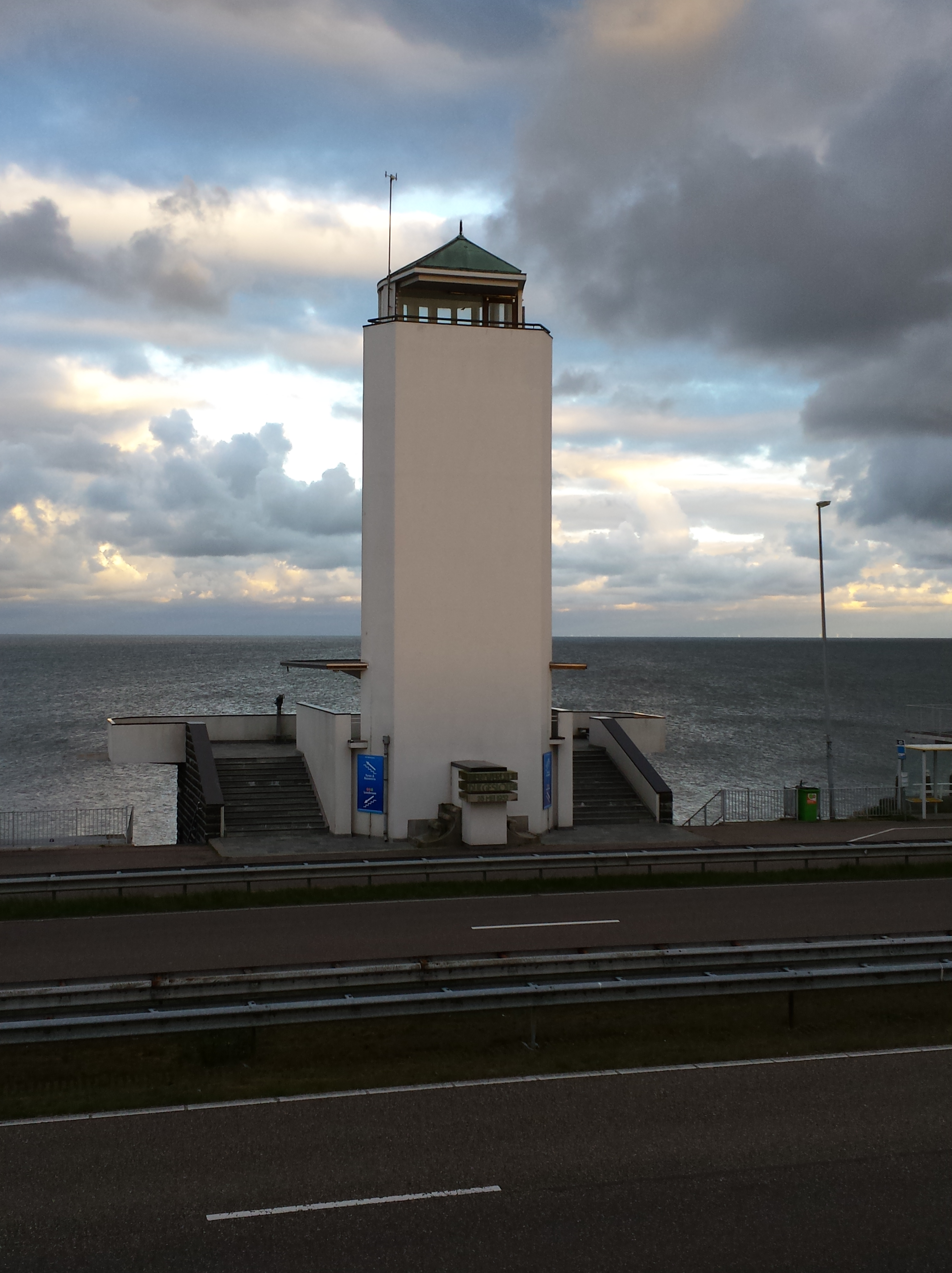
Monument on the Afsluitdijk

== See also ==
- Breezanddijk
- Kornwerderzand
- Den Oever Lighthouse
- Stelling Den Oever
