= Stelling Kornwerderzand =

Dutch coastal fortification group in Friesland

Redoubt Kornwerderzand (Dutch: Stelling Kornwerderzand) is a Dutch fortification group located on the Northeastern end of the Afsluitdijk, a dam stretching across the mouth of the Zuiderzee. The Dutch Defense Ministry demanded that the 32 km (20 mi) long dam be fortified since it connected the provinces of Friesland and North Holland, where the main Dutch naval base was. Work on the fortifications at Kornwerderzand started in 1931 and ended in 1936. The fortifications consisted of 17 reinforced concrete bunkers arrayed in 2 defense lines across 2 artificial islands. 9 bunkers were in the first defense line, and 8 in the second. This page also covers German defenses added during the occupation of the Netherlands. Stelling Kornwerderzand is the only place in the Netherlands that successfully resisted the German invasion. In the Battle of the Afsluitdijk, 225 Dutch soldiers held back 17,500 German troops until the Netherlands surrendered. The Dutch used the term Kazemat, which translates to Casemate in English.

== First Defense Line ==
Machine Gun Casemate I

MG Casemate I

Machine Gun Casemate I was 1 of multiple MG casemates and bunkers built in Stelling Kornwerderzand. The casemate was located the farthest from the Afsluitdijk on a small man-made breakwater. MG Casemate I was armed with a Schwarzlose M.08/15 heavy machine gun in a casemate and a Lewis M20 light machine gun in an outdoor machine gun post protected by concrete walls on 3 sides.

Anti-tank Casemate II

Anti-tank Casemate II is located near the shipping locks on the northern side of the Afsluitdijk. The bunker was armed with a Schwarzloze M.08/15 heavy machine gun in a casemate and a 5 cm Siderius anti-tank gun. The anti tank is mounted rather oddly, whereas most anti-tank bunker’s gun are mounted with just the barrel on a mount, Casemate II’s AT gun is the full gun, chassis and all. 2 large steel doors would be opened during combat and the whole gun would be exposed to enemy fire. The gun faced north-east, and the machine gun faced north, covering the road across the Afsluitdijk. Casemate II was also equipped with an armored observation dome. Most of the bunker was covered in earth to protect it against artillery fire. That same earth now grows foliage that covers the bunker today.

Shelter III

Shelter III was constructed as a completely underground bunker, and is located underneath the water locks control tower. It had an infirmary, generator, and barracks for the bunker crew. There was also an oil storage tank for the generator and a water reservoir. The entrance is faintly visible on the back side of the control tower.

MG Casemate IV

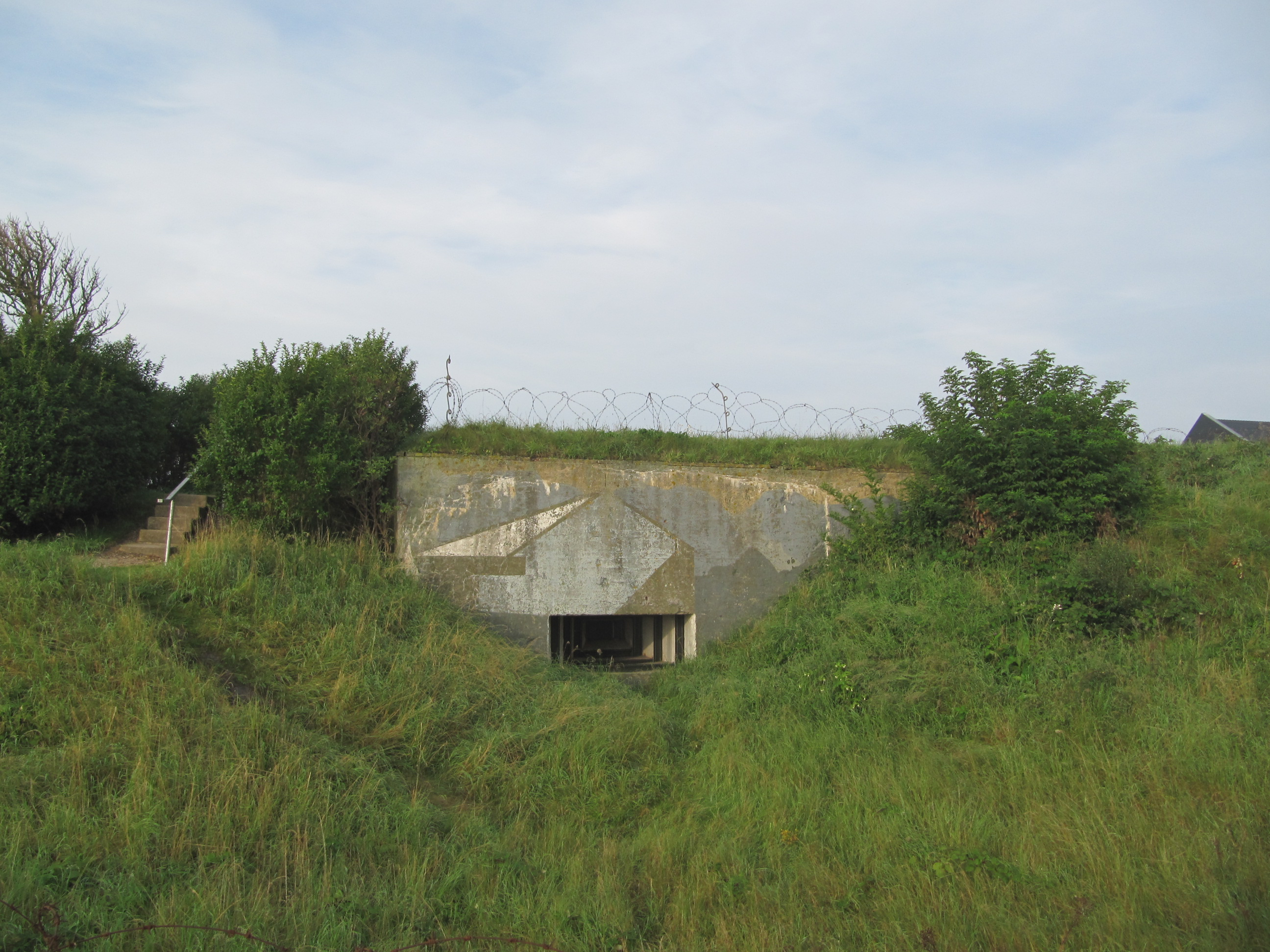
The machine gun embrasure of Casemate IV.

MG Casemate IV was the command bunker for Stelling Kornwerderzand, and thus was more equipped than other bunkers. Because the casemate was the command bunker, it was equipped with a telephone exchange for communicating with the other fortifications of Stelling Kornwerderzand. The bunker was equipped with a Schwarzloze heavy machine gun in a casemate and an armored observation dome on top of the bunker. Except near the observation dome, the top and 2 ½ sides of the bunker are surrounded by earth for protection. Only the rear and where the machine gun casemate are is where the concrete is exposed to air. Above the casemate are the original camouflage paintings from 1932.

MG Casemate V

MG Casemate V.

MG Casemate V is located north of the water locks on the southern side of the first island. The bunker was built in 1933 and was armed with 2 machine guns. Inside the casemate was a Schwarzloze M.08/15 heavy machine gun, and a Lewis M.20 light machine gun could be placed in an exterior position on the concrete parapet that surrounded the bunker. The crew was 9 corporals and 1 petty officer. The bunker saw action between May 12–14, 1940. Today, there is an exhibit on local resistance and a Lockheed Hudson which crashed nearby.

Dual Anti-Tank Casemate VI

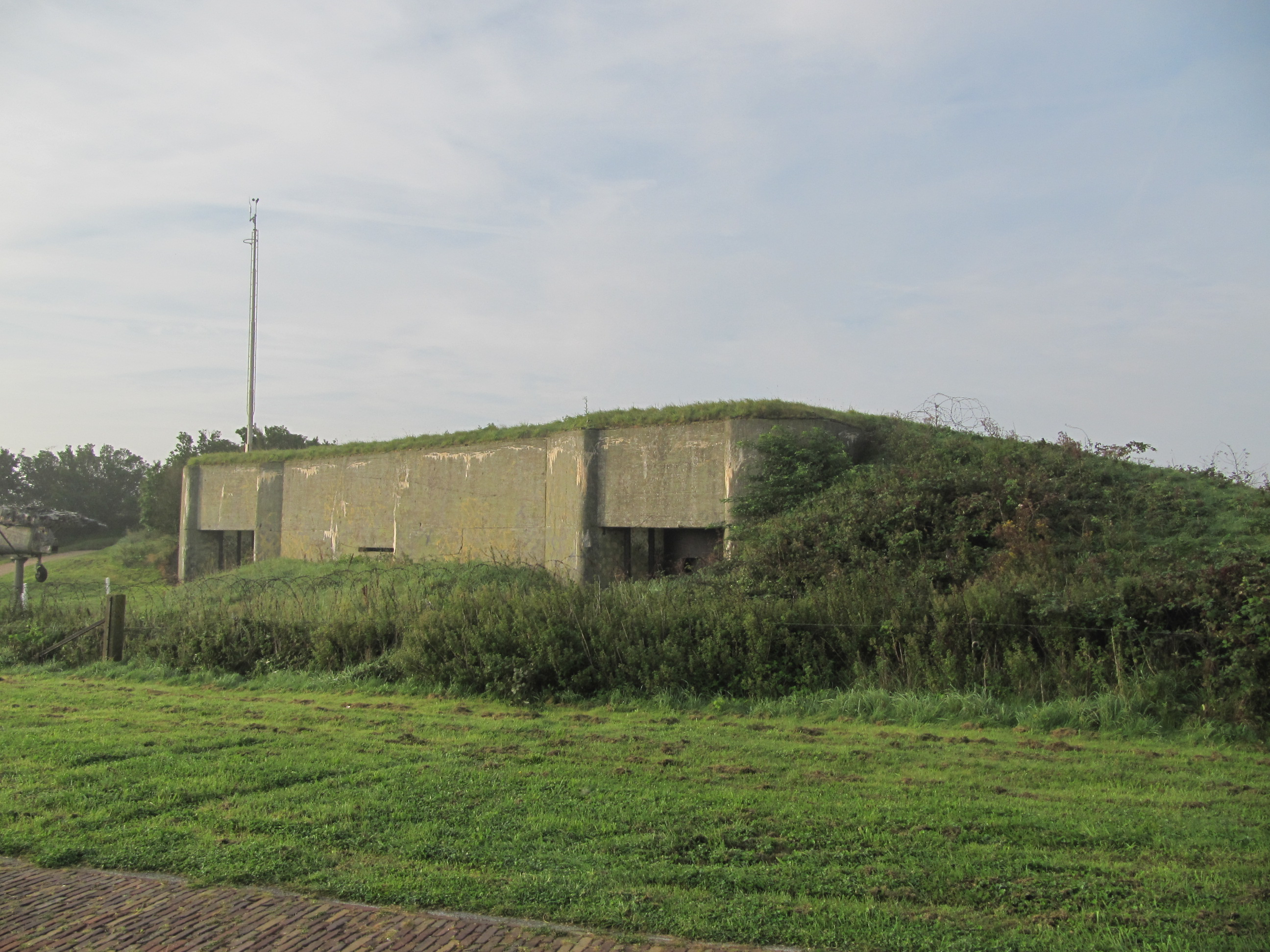
The front of Casemate VI.

An American-made Canadian artillery piece used to assault Kornwerderzand in 1945.

Casemate VI was the most heavily armed bunker in the whole Kornwerderzand complex, and was also the largest. The bunker was built in 1933, and is one of only 2 anti-tank casemates in Stelling Kornwerderzand. The crew was 2 officers and 20 enlisted men. The bunker was built with an underground level for housing and amenities, and they were located belowground to protect them. The bunker was armed with 1 Schwarzloze heavy machine gun in a casemate and 2 Siderius 5 cm anti-tank guns in casemates. The guns were fired through a small metal slot that could be opened or closed. The bunker played a large part in repelling the German assaults between May 12–14, 1940. The German forces were worried that the anti-tank fire from Casemate VI would stop a tank assault, so they concentrated most of their artillery fire and infantry assaults on the bunker. The reinforced concrete construction helped deflect or stop the shells. On May 13, the Germans brought up their 88mm anti-aircraft guns to bombard the fort. The bombardment didn’t last long however, as the gunboat HNLMS Johan Maurits van Nassau fired 31 shells and neutralized every German 88mm gun. The Germans tried again later with heavier artillery, but still couldn’t destroy Casemate VI, and the following attack was swiftly repulsed by the Dutch.

MG And Spotlight Bunker VII

The rear of Casemate VII.

MG and Spotlight Bunker VII was located in the First Line of Defense, south of Casemate VI. The bunker was armed with a machine gun facing east, across the locks. The bunker was also equipped with a spotlight that, through a series of mirrors, could shine a beam across the whole area of the dam. The thought process was that if the enemy shot a cheap mirror they would not be breaking an expensive military spotlight.

MG Casemate VIII

MG Casemate VIII was constructed southeast of Bunker VII, on a breakwater on the southeastern side of the locks. The casemate was armed with 1 heavy machine gun indoors, and 1 light machine gun located outdoors in a reinforced position on the parapet.

MG Casemate IX

MG Casemate IX was located on the southernmost part of the Afsluitdijk. It was armed with a heavy machine gun facing east. The casemate is overgrown with vegetation today, and is in dilapidated condition.

Anti-Aircraft Bunker XIV

Anti-Aircraft Bunker XIV was a dual-purpose anti-aircraft/supply bunker. The bunker housed the kitchen as well as 2 Oerlikon 20mm anti-aircraft guns. The 2 anti-aircraft guns were stored inside the bunker, but were towed outside to pre-prepared combat positions during combat. The bunker contained a kitchen, ammo room, supply room, and accommodation for the troops. The bunker was used again after World War II, this time as a supply/hospital bunker. The bunker still has the original steel doors.

Dutch “Asparagus” Anti-Tank Defenses

In front of the First Defensive Line was 2 rows of “Asparagus”, which was a steel I-beam built at a vertical or slight angle. The asparagus stopped the German 2nd Cavalry Divisions attacks, but were removed during the German occupation.

== Second Defensive Line ==
MG Casemate X

MG Casemate X is located in the second line of defenses, on the northern side of the Afsluitdijk near the road. The bunker was covered almost completely with earth, so only the firing port and the rear were exposed. The bunker measures 11m x 15.5m, and was armed with 1 heavy machine gun in a casemate. The firing embrasure for the machine gun could be closed by a sliding metal sheet when the gun was not in action. The machine gun was sighted on the northern side of the locks, to fire on any personnel attacking the first defensive line or any intrusions near the locks by a foreign navy. Inside was a crew accommodation room, ammunition storage room, machine gun room, and 2 indoor toilets (accessed from the exterior). MG Casemate X still has its original steel doors, but the casemate has been bricked up to keep people from entering.

MG Casemate XI

MG casemate XI was constructed on the southern side of the dam, and guarded the southern side of the locks. The bunker was armed with 1 heavy machine gun in a casemate facing North-East. Most of the bunker is covered with earth and overgrown today.

Casemate XI.

MG Casemate XII

MG Casemate XII was built in 1933, and is located on the southern side of the roadway, facing the locks. The bunker was almost completely covered in earth, with only the machine gun casemate and the rear exposed. Inside, there are accommodations for the men, an observation dome with a periscope, an auxiliary telephone room in case the command bunker was knocked out, and 2 toilets that were accessed from the exterior. The bunker still has the original steel door, but in front of it has been bricked up to keep people out.

Anti-Aircraft Bunker XV

Anti-Aircraft Bunker XV is located on the Northern side of the roadway, and faces North-East. The bunker measures 15m x 21.5m. The bunker was armed with 2 Oerlikon 20mm anti-aircraft guns that were stored in the bunker, but were moved out into pre-prepared positions during combat. The bunker was also equipped with mirrors where a spotlight beam would be deflected, so that the enemy wouldn’t know where the spotlight was. After World War II, the bunker was repurposed as a hospital bunker in the IJssel Line.

MG Casemate XVI

MG Casemate XVI was the northernmost bunker of the Second Defensive Line. The bunker was armed with a heavy machine gun in a casemate facing north, protecting a small strip of land that stretches out into the North Sea. The bunker was also equipped with a periscope on the roof to direct the machine gun fire. The Germans repurposed the bunker as part of the Atlantikwall fortifications, and thus repainted the bunker to blend in with the surroundings.

Anti-Tank Casemate XVII

The diesel generator.

Anti-tank Casemate XVII is located just south of Casemate XI, and the gun faced east. The bunker was armed with a 5 cm Siderius anti-tank gun. The bunker measures 8.5m x 18m Anti-Tank Casemate XVII was not originally in the defensive schemes of the area, but the Defense Ministry decided that the Second Defensive Line needed an anti-tank bunker. The bunker was also equipped with a diesel generator, which has an exhaust pipe that connects to a concrete vent above the surface. There was also a concrete vent for air. The bunker can be seen with German camouflage, since it was part of the Atlantikwall.

German Defenses

Type 667 Anti-Tank Bunker

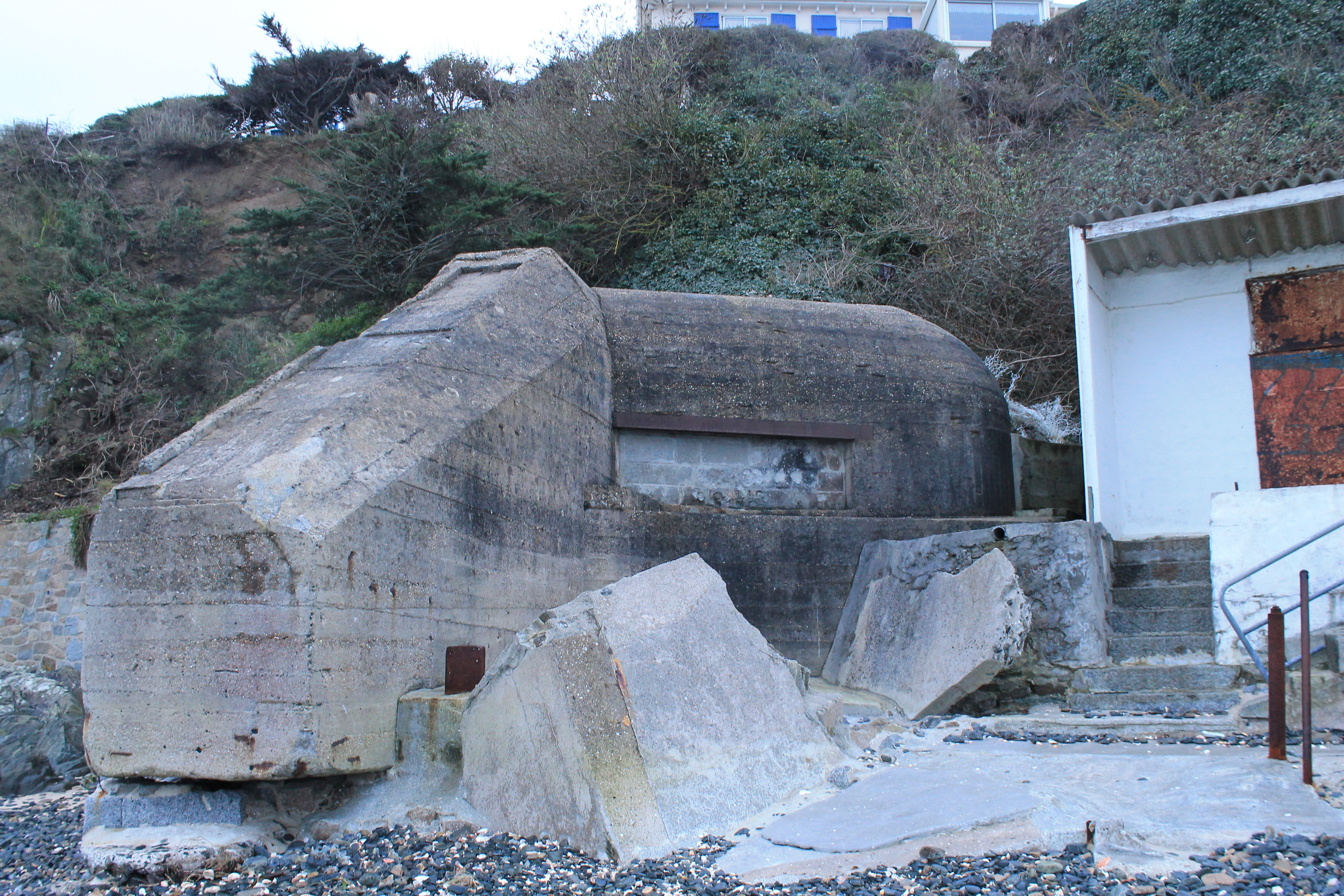
A bunker just like the 2 at Kornwerderzand.

Anti-Tank Bunker Type 667, also known as “Bunker XVIII” is a German anti-tank bunker armed with a 4.7 cm anti-tank gun. There were 2 German anti-tank bunkers constructed at Stelling Kornwerderzand. The bunkers face west, since the Germans anticipated that was the way an Allied assault would come. The bunkers also have a Tobruk integrated into the structure. “Bunker XVIII" was part of the Kazematten Museum, while the other Type 667 is in ruins. The other Type 667 was destroyed in May 1945, by Canadian forces trying to cross the dam.

Type 612 “Schartenstand” Bunker

A Type 612 Anti-Tank bunker, the Tobruk is on the right.

The 2 Type 612 bunkers at Kornwerderzand were constructed near the Second Defense Line, and were meant to provide flanking fire. The bunker was armed with a 4.7 cm anti-tank gun, which was located in a casemate facing west. The bunker’s anti-tank gun covered several lines of Dragons Teeth constructed in 1942.

Anti-Aircraft Positions

Near Casemate XII was an open anti-aircraft concrete position constructed on a hill. The position was armed with a quad 2 cm anti-aircraft gun, and had a commanding view of the Afsluitdijk Dam. Across the hill was a position of the same exact kind.

Dragons Teeth

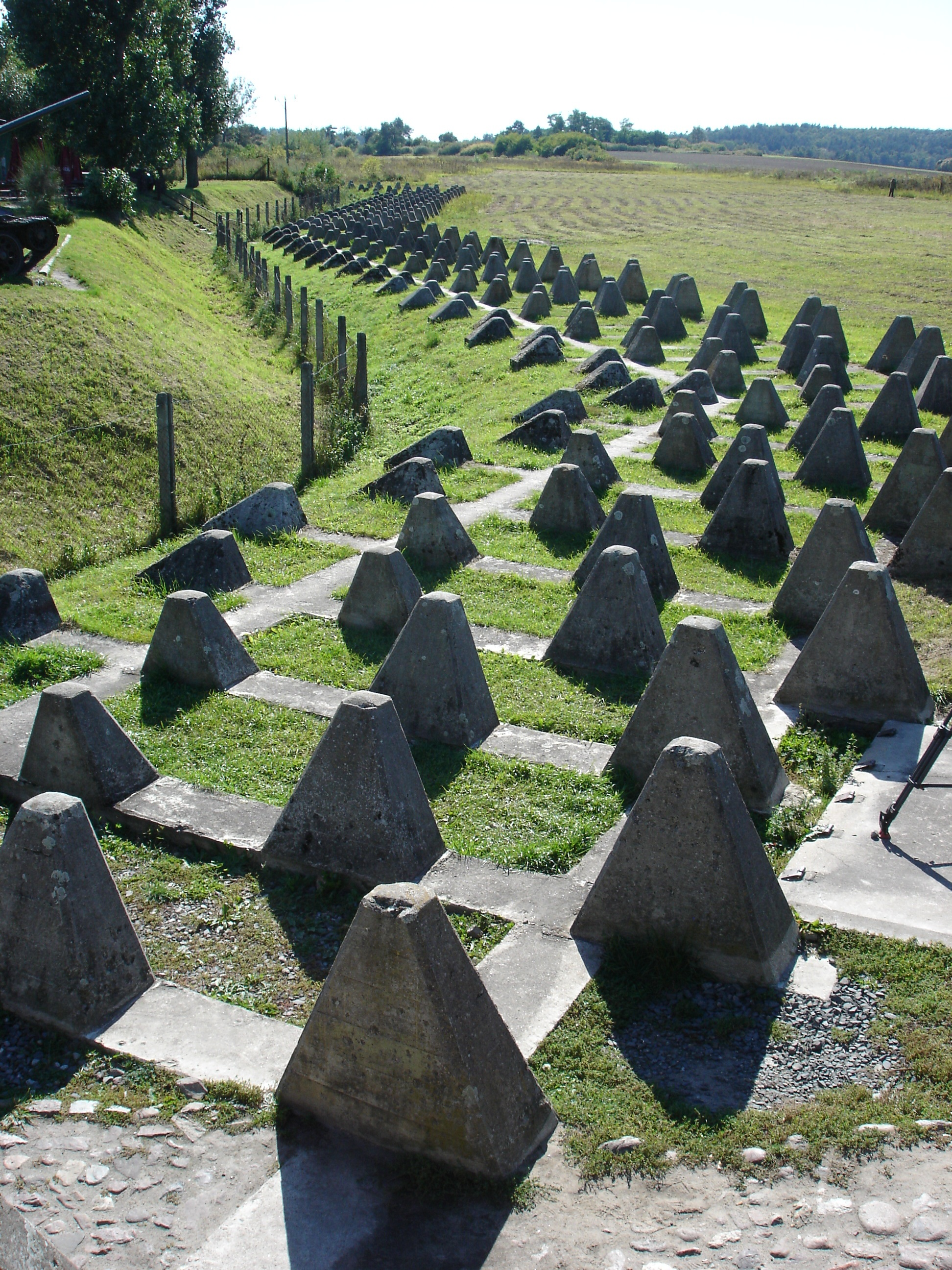
Dragons teeth just like the one at Kornwerderzand, although they were deployed in a far less quantity.

Located behind the Second Defense Line was a line of Dragons Teeth in front of a Type 612 anti-tank bunker. There was another line of Dragons Teeth on the western side of the First Defense Line.
