= Battle of the Afsluitdijk =

1940 WWII battle in the Netherlands

Coordinates: 53°4′27″N 5°20′13″E

- Part of the Battle of the Netherlands
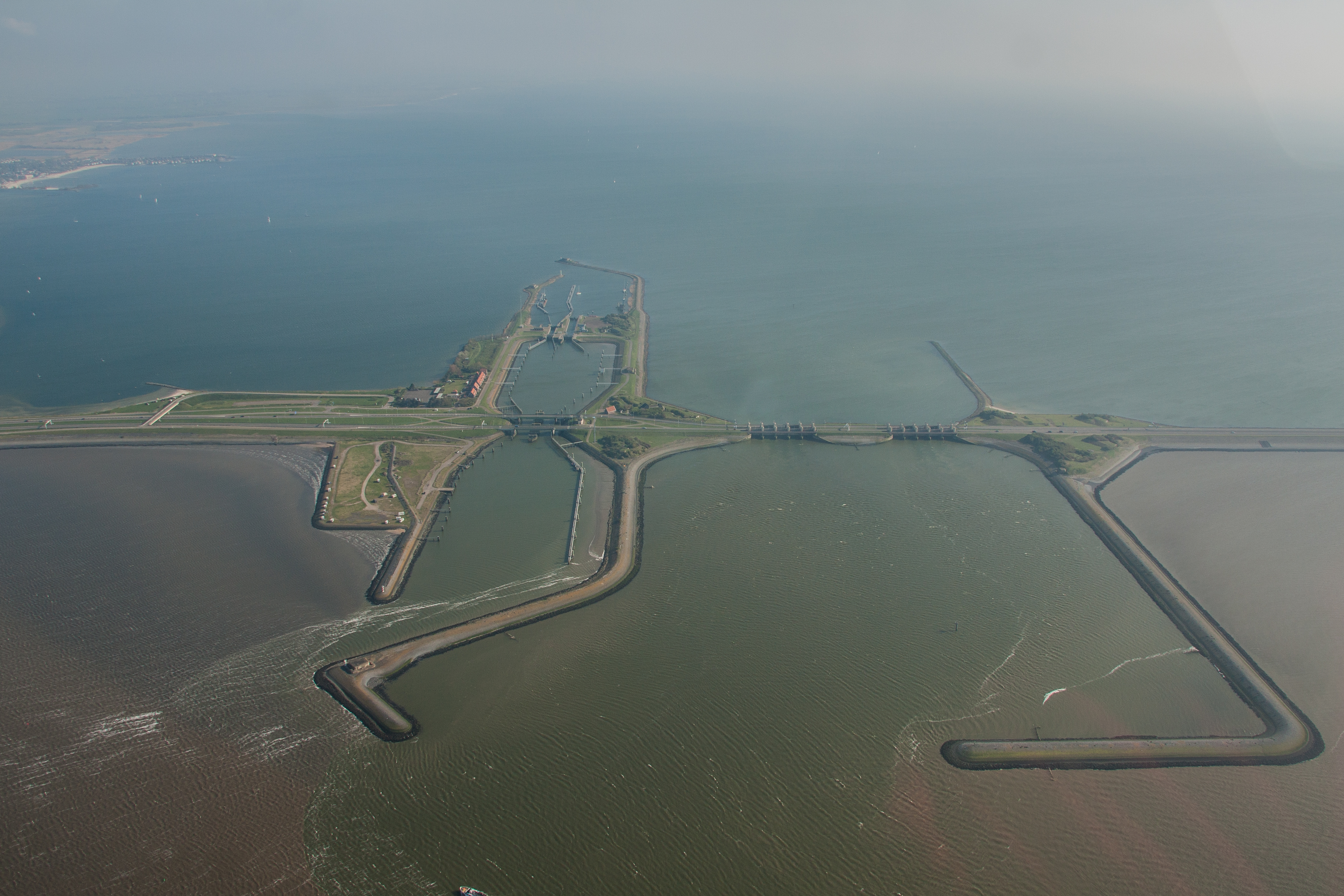
- Wehrmacht forces launched their attack from the left
Date	12–14 May 1940
Location	Afsluitdijk, Netherlands
Result	Dutch victory

Belligerents
Netherlands	Germany

Commanders and leaders
Hoyte Jolles; Christiaan Boers	Kurt Feldt

Strength
225 men; 1 gunboat	500 men; 69 aircraft

Casualties and losses
1 killed; 2 wounded	5 killed; 25 wounded; 4 aircraft destroyed
- Civilian casualties; 2 killed, 10 wounded

The Battle of the Afsluitdijk of 12–14 May 1940 was an unsuccessful attempt by German Wehrmacht forces to seize the Afsluitdijk during the invasion of the Netherlands. German invasion plans called for a simultaneous attack on Vesting Holland from multiple directions, expecting to capture the country's capital and most important region in a day's time.

To facilitate an attack from the north, Wehrmacht elements commanded by General Kurt Feldt first needed to cross the Afsluitdijk, a 32-kilometer-long (20 mi) causeway and dike connecting the country's northern provinces to its western province of North Holland and ultimately to Amsterdam and beyond.

Despite finding themselves outmanned and outgunned, Royal Dutch Army troops commanded by Captain Christiaan Boers, under the overall command of rear-Admiral Hoyte Jolles, managed to successfully hold back the attackers at Fort Kornwerderzand, protected by modernized heavily fortified defensive positions. The German Army was thus prevented from immediately concentrating its full strength on the country's most vital area.

The pinned down German forces were eventually forced to retreat and subsequently routed their attack across the IJsselmeer, bypassing the Afsluitdijk and landing north of Amsterdam. The Dutch garrison capitulated on May 14, after the bombing of Rotterdam. Kornwerderzand was the only line of defense that successfully withstood an enemy attack during the conflict, and was one of the few Blitzkrieg defeats suffered by the Wehrmacht.

== Background ==
Nazi Germany invaded the Netherlands on 10 May 1940 as part of Fall Gelb, simultaneously invading Belgium and France through the Ardennes. In the north, German forces rapidly advanced past two thin Dutch defensive lines parallel to the border, stretching across the provinces of Drenthe and Groningen, before further advancing into western Friesland.

On 12 May, the German 1st Cavalry Division—later regrouped into the 24th Panzer Division—had captured the last line of Dutch defences lying in front of the Afsluitdijk, and began preparing an assault on two defensive lines comprising 17 pillboxes and casemates around Fort Kornwerderzand, designed to withstand direct hits by 210 mm rounds and indirect hits by 280 mm rounds.

Its three main casemates were made of three metres (9.8 ft) of reinforced concrete and sheltered 230 men, twenty-one 7.92 mm Schwarzlose machine guns, three 50 mm guns, and a 50 mm shore-based naval gun, with similar defences at the Afsluitdijk's other end.

== Battle ==
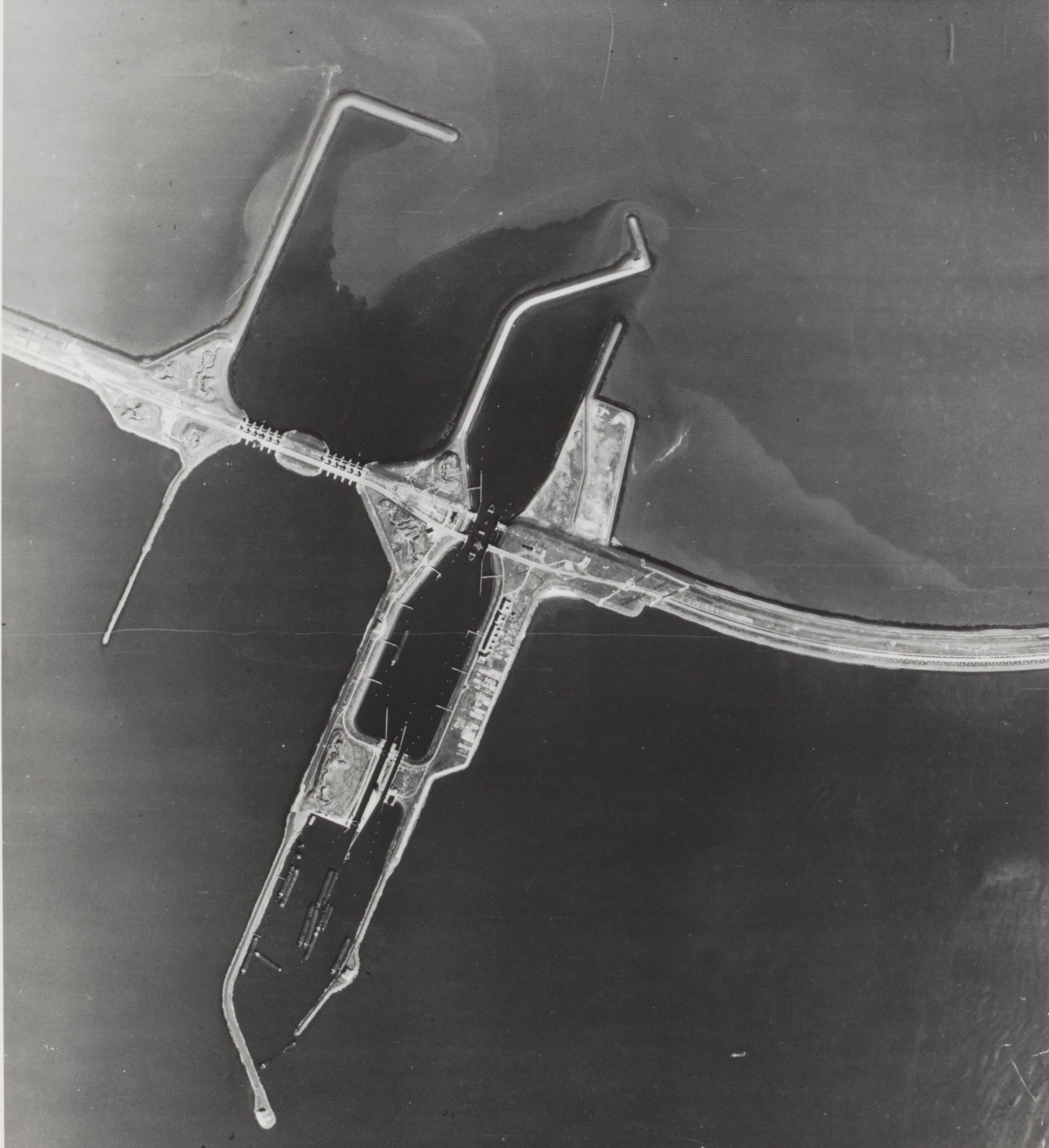
Fort Kornwerderzand in 1945

Earlier in May 1940, two infantry sections—70 men in all—were sent to the end of the dike to prevent German landings beyond the vision of both fortresses. The Germans soon found out about these units, and seven Luftwaffe fighters strafed Dutch positions. One soldier and two civilians were killed, in addition to ten wounded civilians. The Dutch were forced to retreat to Kornwerderzand.

German forces did not attempt to take Fort Kornwerderzand until 12 May. During the evening, three soldiers were sent to check whether the fort had been abandoned. They were suddenly met by machine-gun fire which caused two fatalities, though the third managed to escape. The Germans nevertheless decided to take the fortress and planned to call in Luftwaffe strikes, before firing an extended howitzer barrage, after which 500 soldiers would commence the assault.

Unbeknownst to the Germans, three privately funded Swiss-made Oerlikon 20 mm cannon anti-aircraft cannons and four heavy anti-aircraft machine guns had arrived overnight at Kornwerderzand. The next day, pilots who had previously flown unchallenged were fired upon. The Germans sent 62 planes to bomb the fort, dropping five waves of bombs. Four planes were shot down and crashed into the sea. The bombardment was followed by an hour of intense howitzer fire which had little effect on the heavily protected Dutch fortifications.

Dutch Oerlikon 20 mm cannon

As soon as the artillery barrage stopped, German shock troops advanced down the narrow dike on bicycles. The Dutch commander, Christiaan Boers, waited until they were within 800 metres (870 yd) before he ordered machine-gun fire, making it difficult for the Germans to withdraw. Most soldiers tried to hide, while a few managed to advance. The Germans were under constant fire for nearly an hour and a half. Once Boers ordered firing to stop the remaining Germans withdrew – the assault had failed. During the night Boers ordered the dike to be lit by flares and searchlights to prevent a surprise attack on their position.

On the early morning of 14 May, the Germans once again fired their artillery at the fortress, but during the night Rear-Admiral Jolles had ordered the gunboat HNLMS Johan Maurits van Nassau, which returned fire with her three heavy 150 mm guns from her position in the Wadden Sea; approximately 18 kilometres (11 mi) from the German positions. Attack coordinates were phoned in from the fortress to the Navy Command in Den Helder, then sent by wireless radio to the gunboat. This barrage silenced the German guns in less than an hour and shocked General Kurt Feldt, who was unaware of the presence of any Dutch artillery in the area, let alone such a heavy caliber.

== Aftermath ==
The fortress remained in Dutch hands until the surrender of Dutch forces on 15 May. Boers complimented his men by stating that although they had fought like lions, in other parts of the country their armies had been defeated. Boers himself led the surrender.

Rumors among civilians quickly emerged; hundreds of Germans were killed, and the dike was filled with bodies. The German report states two were killed on the 12th, and three on the 13th, with approximately 25 wounded. The Dutch suffered one killed as a result of the first Luftwaffe attack. Two were wounded while manning anti-aircraft guns. Two civilians were killed, ten were wounded, also as a result of the Luftwaffe attack.

== See also ==
- List of Dutch military equipment of World War II
- List of German military equipment of World War II
