= Breezanddijk =

Breezanddijk Breesândyk
- Village
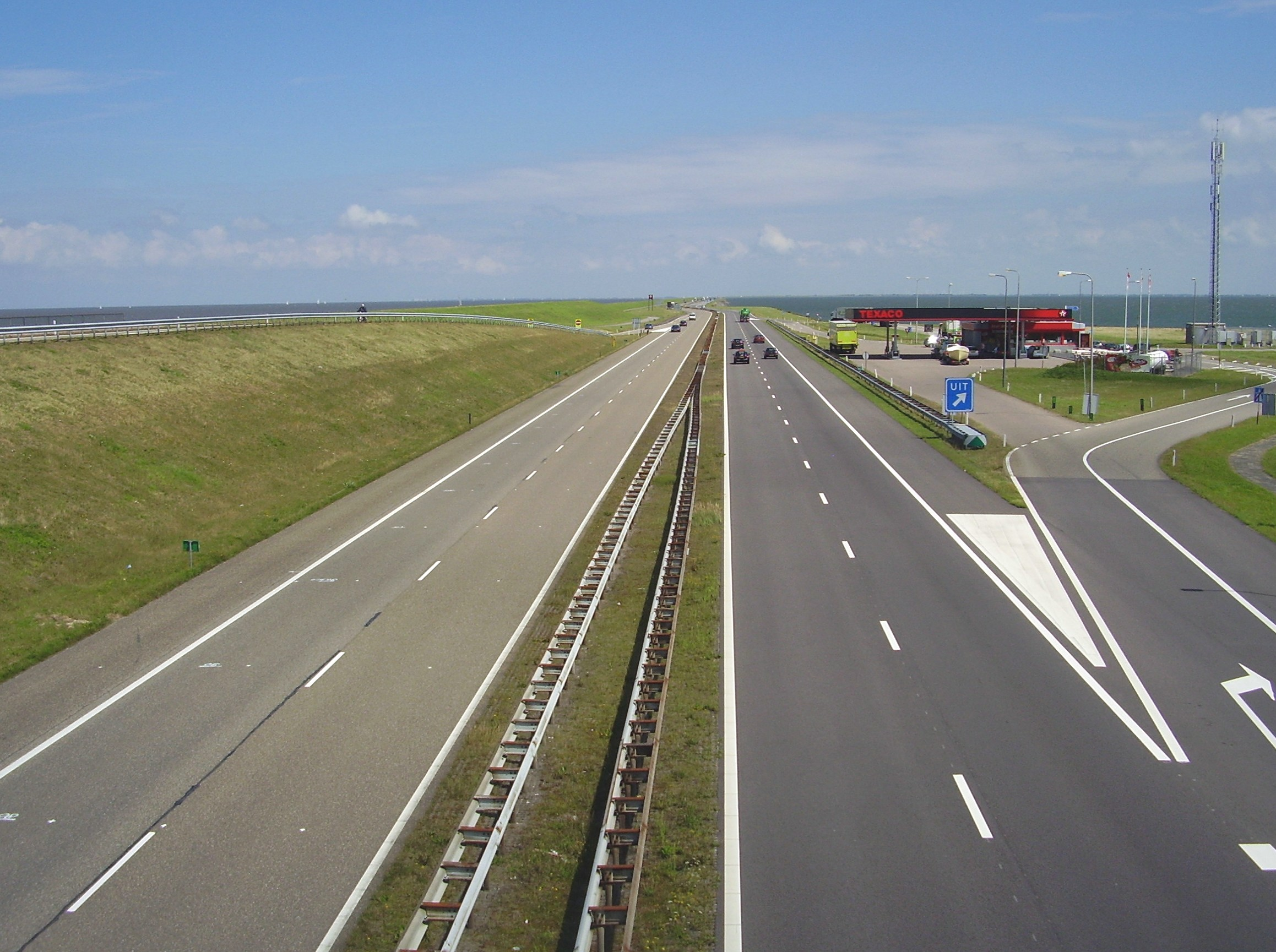
- Texaco (now Esso) gas station at Breezanddijk on the Afsluitdijk

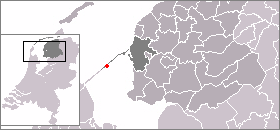
- Location in the former Wymbritseradiel municipality

- Location in the Netherlands Breezanddijk (Netherlands)
- Country: Netherlands
- Province: Friesland
- Municipality: Súdwest-Fryslân

Area
  - Total: 1.63 km^{2} (0.63 sq mi)

Population (2021)
  - Total: 5
  - Density: 3.1/km^{2} (7.9/sq mi)
- Time zone: UTC+1 (CET)
  - Summer (DST): UTC+2 (CEST)
- Postal code: 8766
- Dialing code: 0517

Breezanddijk (West Frisian: Breesândyk) is a small community that lies near the midpoint of the Afsluitdijk, part of the A7 motorway, in the Netherlands. It is located on a former artificial island which was created during the construction of the dam, and it belongs to the municipality of Súdwest-Fryslân, in Friesland province. The hamlet lies between Den Oever and Kornwerderzand.

== History ==
The construction of the Afsluitdijk started at four points: two on both sides of the mainland and on two specially made construction-islands (Kornwerderzand and Breezanddijk) along the line of the future dyke. There are about 40-50 buildings, most of which are bunkhouses that were built for the workers employed during the construction of the Afsluitdijk. Today, it has a population of only four people living on a houseboat and its sole commercial establishment is a Esso gas station for travelers upon the dike. Formerly, Breezanddijk was part of the municipality of Wûnseradiel, but in 2011, that municipality merged with four others to form the new Súdwest-Fryslân.

There are two small harbours, one on the North Sea side of the dike, and the other on the IJsselmeer side.

== See also ==
- Flood control in the Netherlands
- Flood
- Zuiderzee
- Zuiderzee Works
- Afsluitdijk
- IJsselmeer
- Markermeer
- Zuiderzeemuseum
- Delta Works for another major waterworks project in the Netherlands.
- Lauwerszee Works
