= Kornwerderzand =

Kornwerderzand Koarnwertersân
- Village
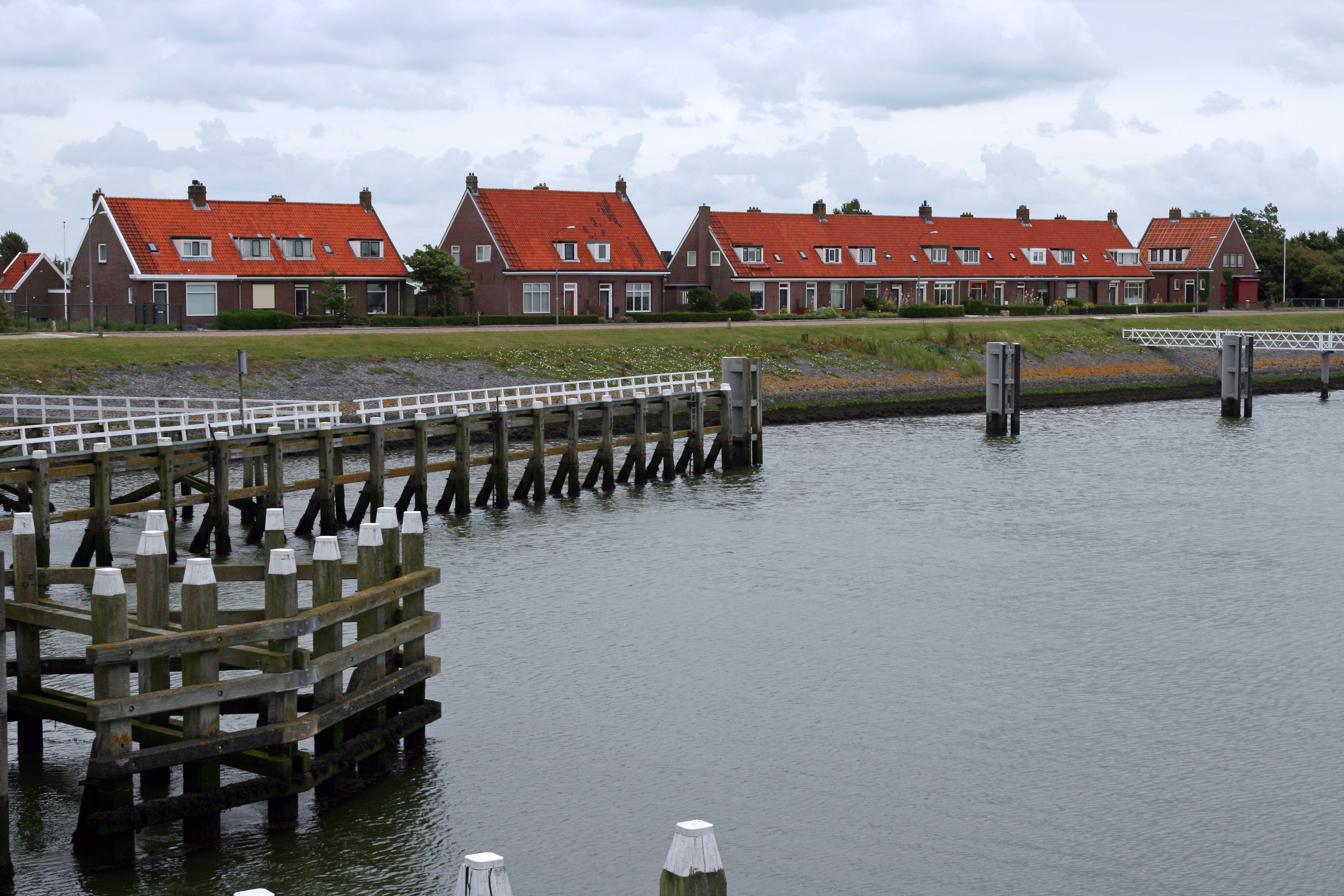

- Flag Coat of arms

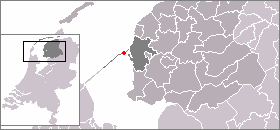
- Location in Friesland

- Location in the Netherlands Kornwerderzand (Netherlands)
- Country: Netherlands
- Province: Friesland
- Municipality: Súdwest-Fryslân

Area
  - Total: 3.32 km^{2} (1.28 sq mi)

Population (2021)
  - Total: 50
  - Density: 15/km^{2} (39/sq mi)
- Time zone: UTC+1 (CET)
  - Summer (DST): UTC+2 (CEST)
- Postal code: 8752
- Dialing code: 0515

Kornwerderzand (West Frisian: Koarnwertersân) is a village on the Afsluitdijk, a major dam in the Netherlands that links Friesland with North Holland.

== Overview ==
Kornwerderzand is located approximately 4 kilometers from the coast of Friesland, on a former artificial island which was created during the construction of the dam. The settlement has a population of 50 (as of 2021). It is part of the municipality of Súdwest-Fryslân. The shipping locks at Kornwerderzand, also known as the Lorentzsluizen ("Lorentz Locks"), provide access to the Wadden Sea from the IJsselmeer, and a complex of discharge sluices control the water level in the IJsselmeer. A second complex of sluices and locks is located at the other side of the Afsluitdijk, near Den Oever.

== History ==
=== Fortifications and military history ===
The Afsluitdijk provides a road link between the provinces of Friesland and North Holland. Since North Holland was part of Vesting Holland ("Fortress Holland"), the national redoubt of the Netherlands at the time, and control of the sluices in the Afsluitdijk was necessary for planned defensive inundations in case of a military invasion, Kornwerderzand was considered strategically important by the Dutch government. From 1931 onwards, fortifications consisting of seventeen casemates and three bunkers were constructed. This groupping of fortifications was called Stelling Kornwerderzand. The position was manned with approximately 220 troops in 1939.

During the German invasion of the Netherlands in World War II, the Kornwerderzand position was defended by Dutch troops. On May 13 and May 14, 1940, the fortifications were attacked by the German first Cavalry Division, while the Luftwaffe attacked supporting Dutch naval units. The German troops, initially lacking support by heavy artillery, were unable to take the position. The fortifications also withstood attacks by dive bombers. The next day the Dutch military in the Netherlands (except for the province of Zealand) surrendered, and the battle ended with the surrender of the position.

In 1943, the occupying German military improved the defenses by building three additional bunkers.

Nowadays, some of the fortifications can be visited as part of the Kazemattenmuseum ("casemate museum").

Before 2011, the village was part of the Wûnseradiel municipality.

== See also ==
- Breezanddijk
