= Afsluitdijk =

Dam in Netherlands

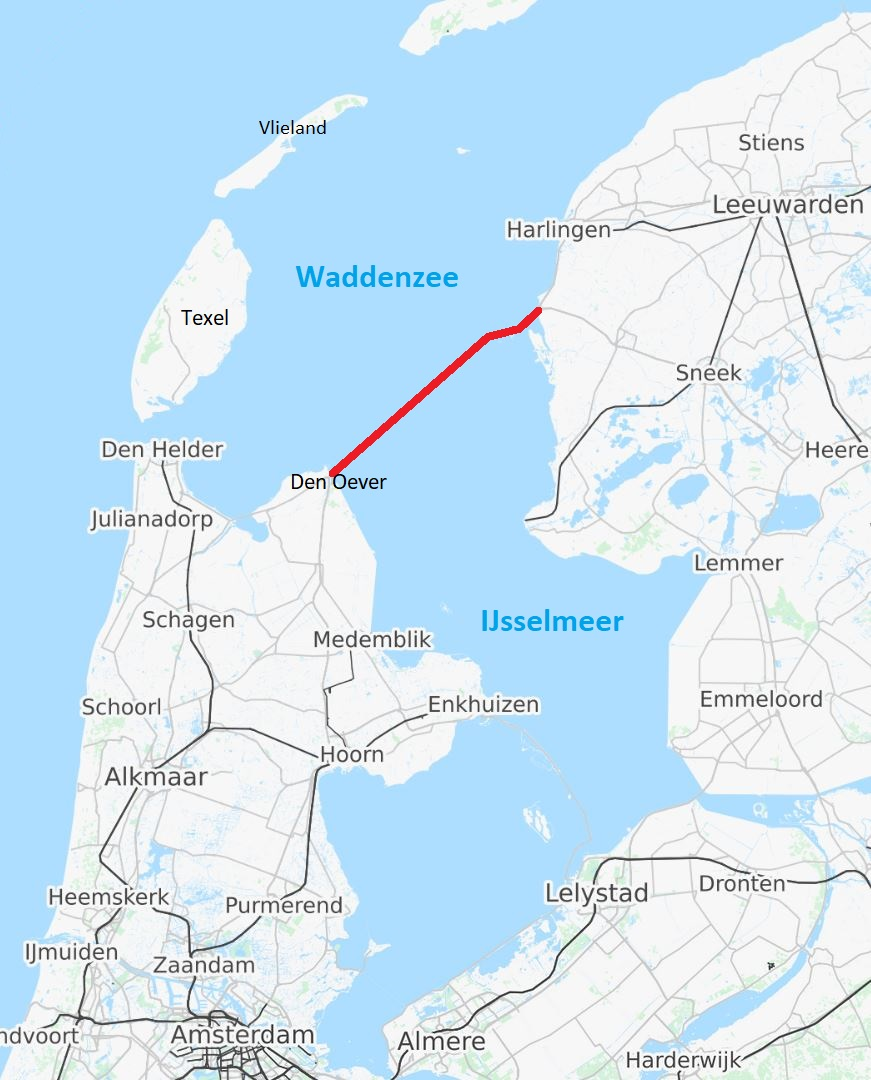
- Afsluitdijk in red
- Interactive map of Afsluitdijk
- Country: Netherlands
- Coordinates: 53°0′N 5°10′E
- Purpose: flood protection and land reclamation
- Construction began: 1927
- Opening date: 1932

Dam and spillways
- Length: 32 km (20 mi)
- Elevation at crest: 7.25 m (23.8 ft) above sea level
- Width (crest): 90 m (300 ft)

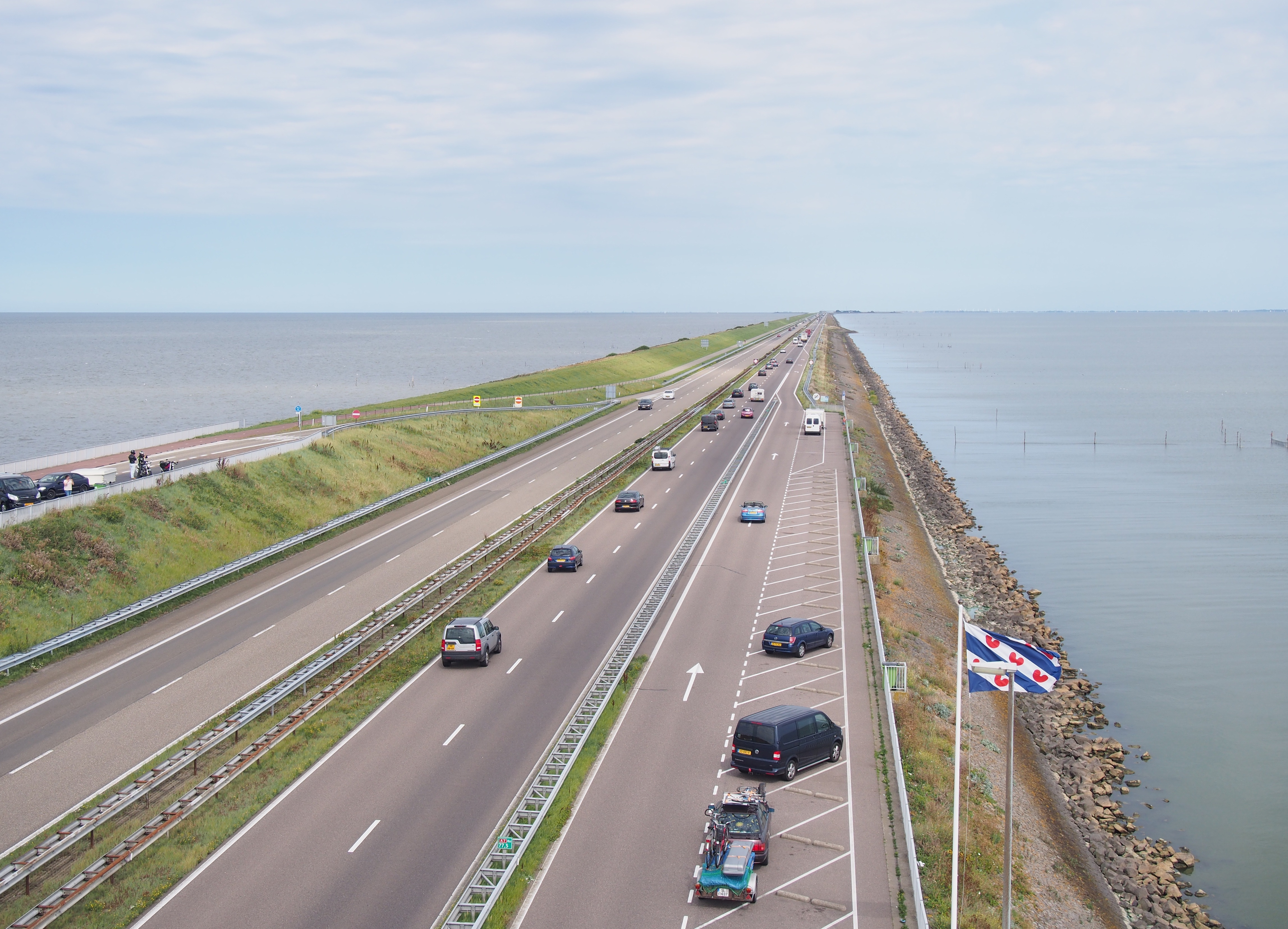
Afsluitdijk with the Wadden Sea (a part of the North Sea) on the left and the IJsselmeer on the right

The Afsluitdijk (Dutch: [ˈɑfslœydɛik]; West Frisian: Ofslútdyk [ˈɔfslyːdik]; "closure dyke" (Note: West Frisian Dutch: Ofsluitdoik; Dutch Low Saxon: Ofsluutdiek)) is a major dam and causeway in the Netherlands. It was constructed between 1927 and 1932 and runs from Den Oever in North Holland province to the village of Zurich in Friesland province, over a length of 32 kilometres (20 mi) and a width of 90 metres (300 ft), at an initial height above Amsterdam Ordnance Datum of between 6.7 metres (22 ft) along the section at Friesland, and 7.4 metres (24 ft) where it crosses the deep channel of the Vlieter. The height at the greater sea depths west of Friesland was required to be a minimum of 7 metres everywhere when originally constructed.

Increases to the height of the Afsluitdijk have been made several times since 1958 as part of regular maintenance since the deadly North Sea Flood of 1953. The section between the Stevinsluizen and Lorentzsluizen sluice complexes was raised to 7.8 metres. Major upgrade works commenced in 2019, with one of the design conditions being that only limited wave overtopping during the design storm condition be permitted. The design proposed by the successful contractor to meet this criterion will see a further increase in the height of the dam, by approximately 2 metres.

The Afsluitdijk is a fundamental part of the larger Zuiderzee Works, damming off the Zuiderzee, a salt water inlet of the North Sea, and turning it into the fresh water lake of the IJsselmeer. It is a major land reclamation project and provides a road connection between the North and West of the Netherlands.

== Construction history ==
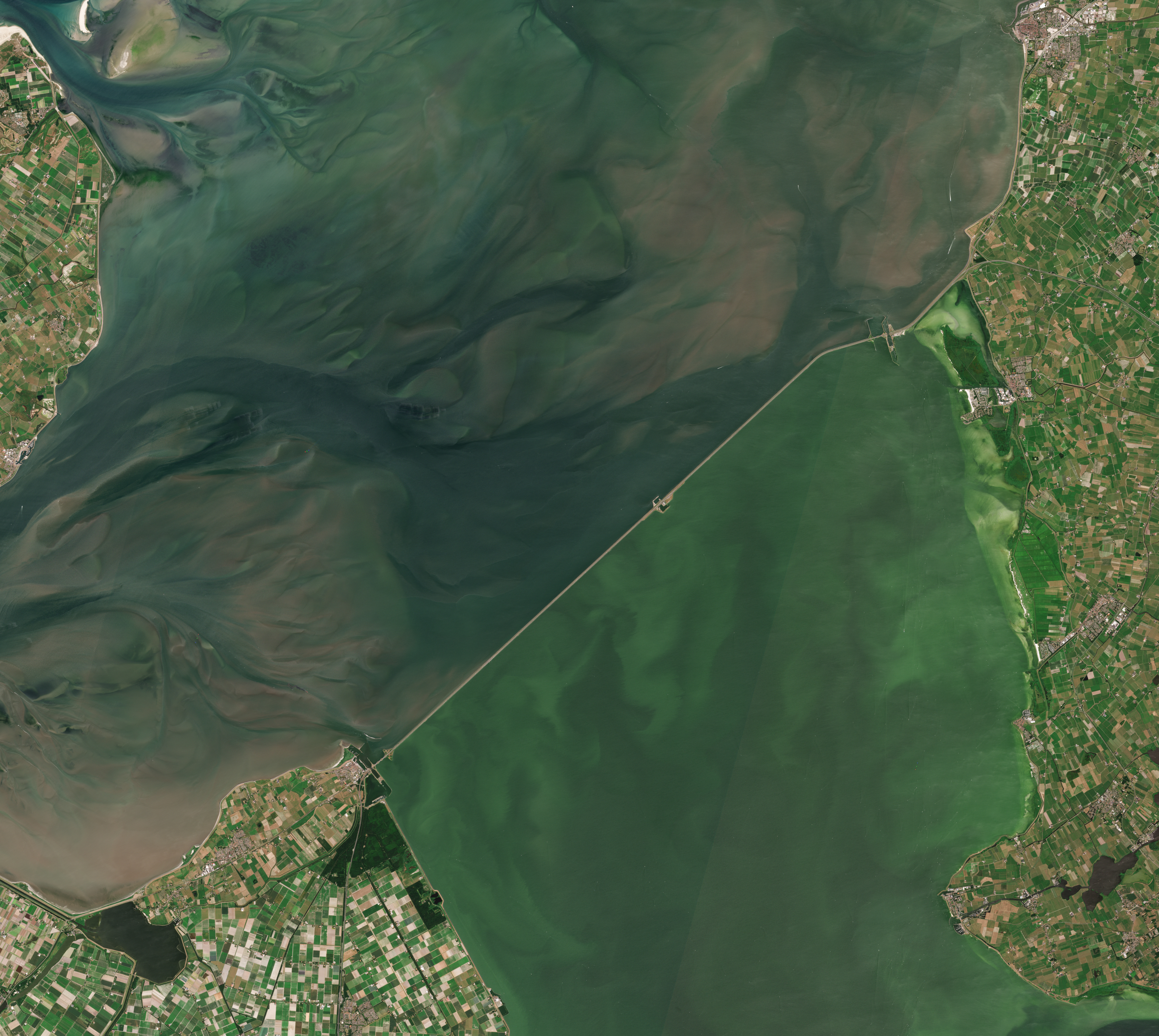
Image from satellite

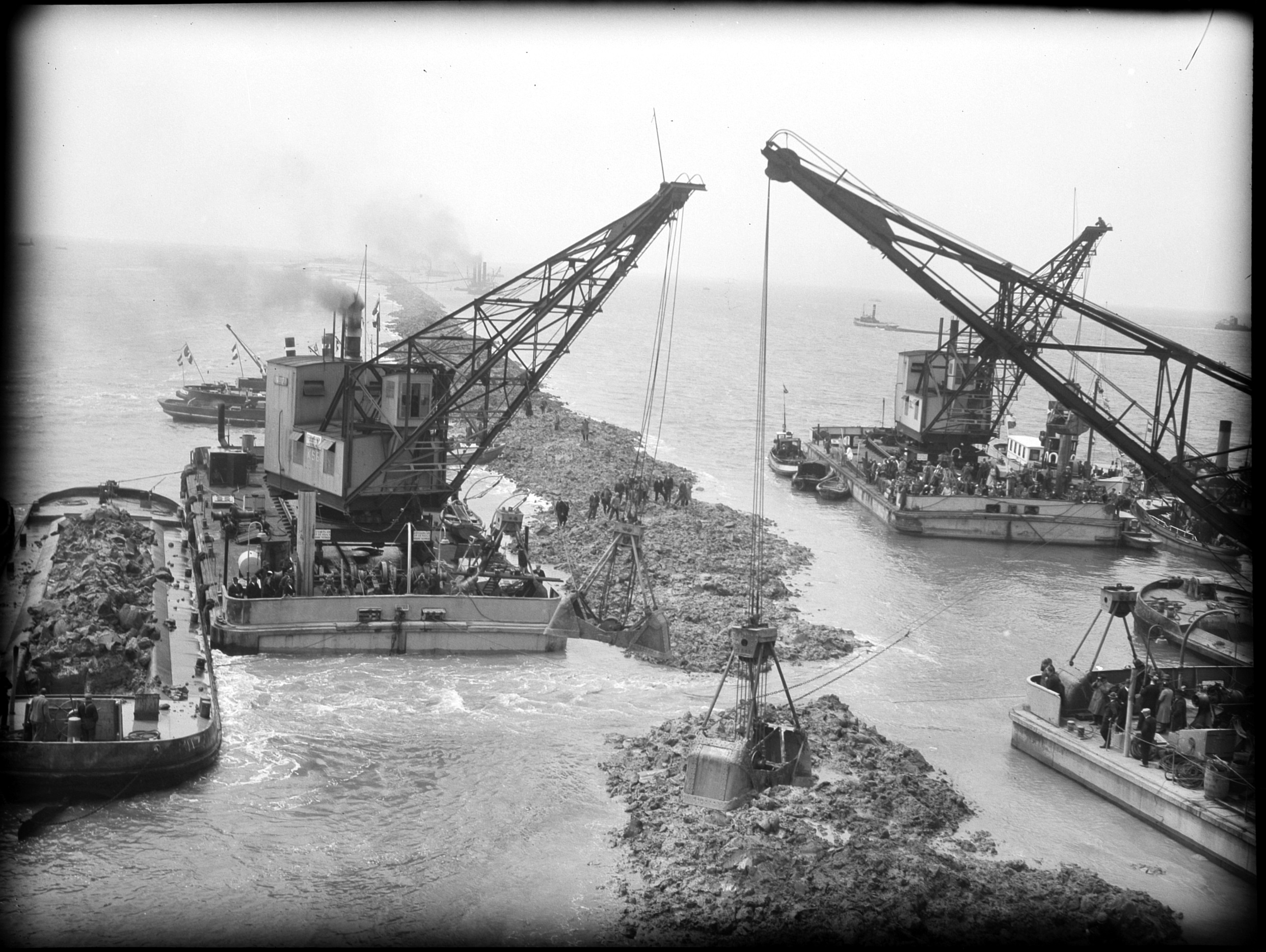
Closing the last gap 'De Vlieter' in 1932

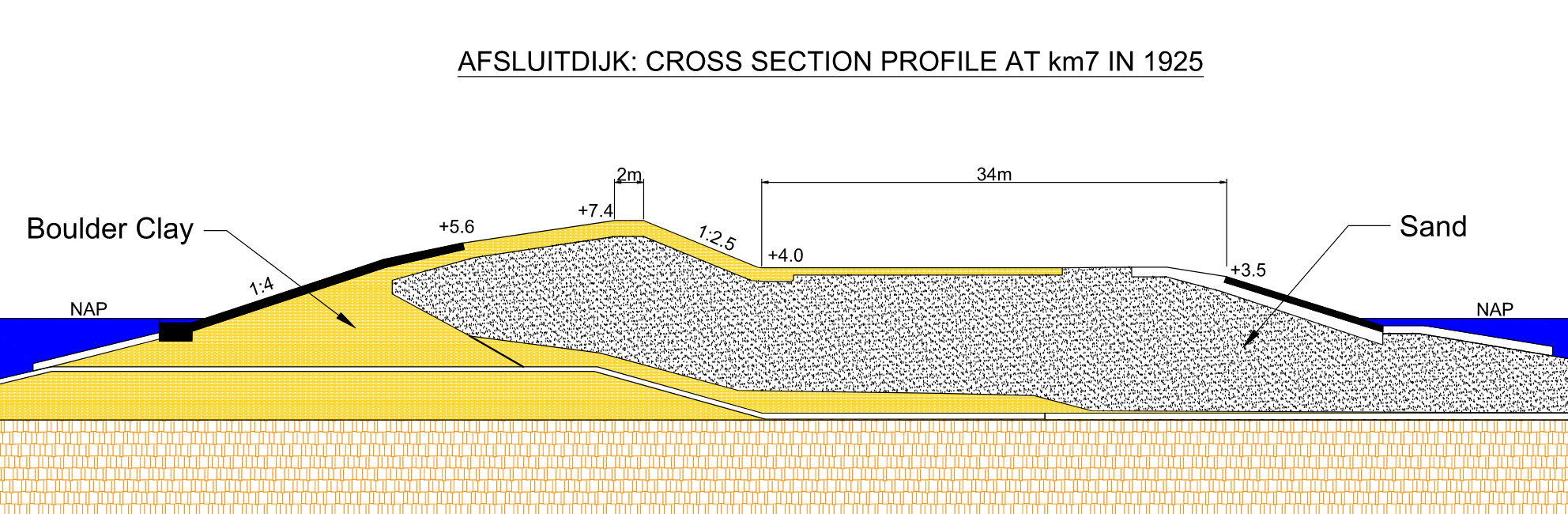
Afsluitdijk profile cross-section as designed in 1925

=== Reasons for construction ===
The Afsluitdijk (literally translated: shut-off-dyke) was completed in 1932, thereby shutting off the Zuiderzee (lit: Southern Sea) from the North Sea. Until then, the Zuiderzee had been a large bay south of the North Sea which gave maritime access to five provinces of The Netherlands, and particularly during the Dutch Golden Age provided a protected entrance and exit for the harbour of Amsterdam and several other important Dutch sea harbours. Furthermore, the Zuiderzee provided relatively shallow and calm fishing grounds for the many towns bordering the bay. However, the opening of the North Sea Canal (Noordzeekanaal) in 1876 gave a much shorter direct entrance to the Amsterdam harbour, and overfishing had depleted the shallow bay. In the second half of the 19th century, the Dutch population was exploding, and there was an increasing need for land for agriculture and animal husbandry. The Dutch already had centuries of experience of building dykes around lakes, emptying them and converting them to fertile polderland.

The next large project was to convert the Zuiderzee into polder. In 1886, a few notables established the Zuiderzee Society to investigate whether reclamation was feasible. One of the most prominent members of the society was Cornelis Lely, a civil engineer, prominent member and later chairman of the society. In 1891 he designed the first plan for the closure and reclamation of the Zuiderzee.

In 1913, Lely was Minister of Water Management, and land reclamation was included in the government program. His plan was initially opposed, particularly for its huge costs and also by the fishing industry. But after the flood of 1916 and the famine of 1918, opinions were ready for this mega project and the parliament agreed, but it took another 9 years, until 1927, before the works actually began.

Newsreel of the closing of the last gap

=== Building the dyke ===
Wieringen was connected to the mainland with the short Amsteldiepdijk in 1925; the Afsluitdijk would be 32 kilometres (20 miles) in length. The inland side is heavy stone; the seaward side is boulder clay with brushwood mattresses above, weighed down by basalt boulders and old concrete. Previous experience had shown that boulder clay was superior to just sand or clay for a structure like the Afsluitdijk, with the added benefit that till was in plentiful supply in the area; it could be retrieved in large quantities by simply dredging it from the bottom of the Zuiderzee. Work started at four points: on both sides of the mainland and on two specially made construction-islands (Kornwerderzand and Breezanddijk) along the line of the future dyke.

From these points, the dyke slowly grew by ships depositing till into the open sea until it breached the surface. The nascent dyke was then strengthened from land by basalt rocks and mats of willow switch at its base. The dyke could then be finished off by raising it further with sand and finally clay for the surface of the dyke, on which grass was planted.

As the dyke grew, physicist Hendrik Antoon Lorentz calculated the force of the tide as the smaller gap made it stronger. Ten thousand workers, 27 large dredges, 13 floating cranes, 132 barges, and 88 tugs worked on the project at the end, timed to close the dyke at low tide; it was finished on 28 May 1932. Construction progressed better than expected; at three points along the line of the dyke there were deeper underwater trenches where the tidal current was much stronger than elsewhere. These had been considered to be major obstacles to completing the dyke, but all of them proved to be relatively straightforward. Two years earlier than initially thought, the Zuiderzee ceased to be, as the last tidal trench, the Vlieter, was closed by a final bucket of till. The IJsselmeer was born, even though it was still salty at the time.

The dyke itself however was not finished as it still needed to be brought up to its required height and a road linking Friesland and North Holland (the current A7/E22 motorway) also remained to be built. On 25 September 1933, the Afsluitdijk was officially opened, with a monument designed by architect Willem Marinus Dudok marking the spot where the dyke had been closed. The amount of material used is estimated at 23 million m^{3} (810 million cu ft) of sand and 13.5 million m^{3} (480 million cu ft) of till and over the years an average of around four to five thousand workers were involved with the construction every day, relieving some of the unemployment following the Great Depression.

Besides the dyke itself, there was also the necessary construction of two complexes of shipping locks and discharge sluices at both ends of the dyke. The complex at Den Oever includes the Stevin lock (named after the son of mathematician and engineer Simon Stevin, Hendrik Stevin, who was the first making a plan to close the Zuiderzee in 1667) and three series of five sluices for discharging the IJsselmeer into the Wadden Sea; the other complex at Kornwerderzand is composed of the Lorentz locks (named after the physicist) and two series of five sluices, making a total of 25 discharge sluices. It is necessary to routinely discharge water from the lake since it is continually fed by rivers and streams (most notably the IJssel river that gives its name to the lake) and polders draining their water into the IJsselmeer.

== Post-construction developments ==
The height of the crest of the Afsluitdijk was originally determined based on insufficient data about wave run-up. This became apparent soon after the first significant storm surge following the completion of the works, which occurred in December 1936. During the storm, the water in the Wadden Sea reached to around half a metre below the dike. For the crown height, storm surge heights indicated by the Staatscommissie Lorentz (SCL) (English: Lorentz State Commission) were primarily used, based on storm surges that had occurred in the period 1825–1926.

According to committee's predictions, if the Zuiderzee had been closed during the 1825–1926 period, the highest water level reached would have been 3.1 metres above Amsterdam Ordnance Datum at Den Oever, and about 3.4 metres on the Friesland coast. However, the commission drew attention to the fact that in a very rare and unfavourable set of circumstances, even higher storm surge heights were possible.

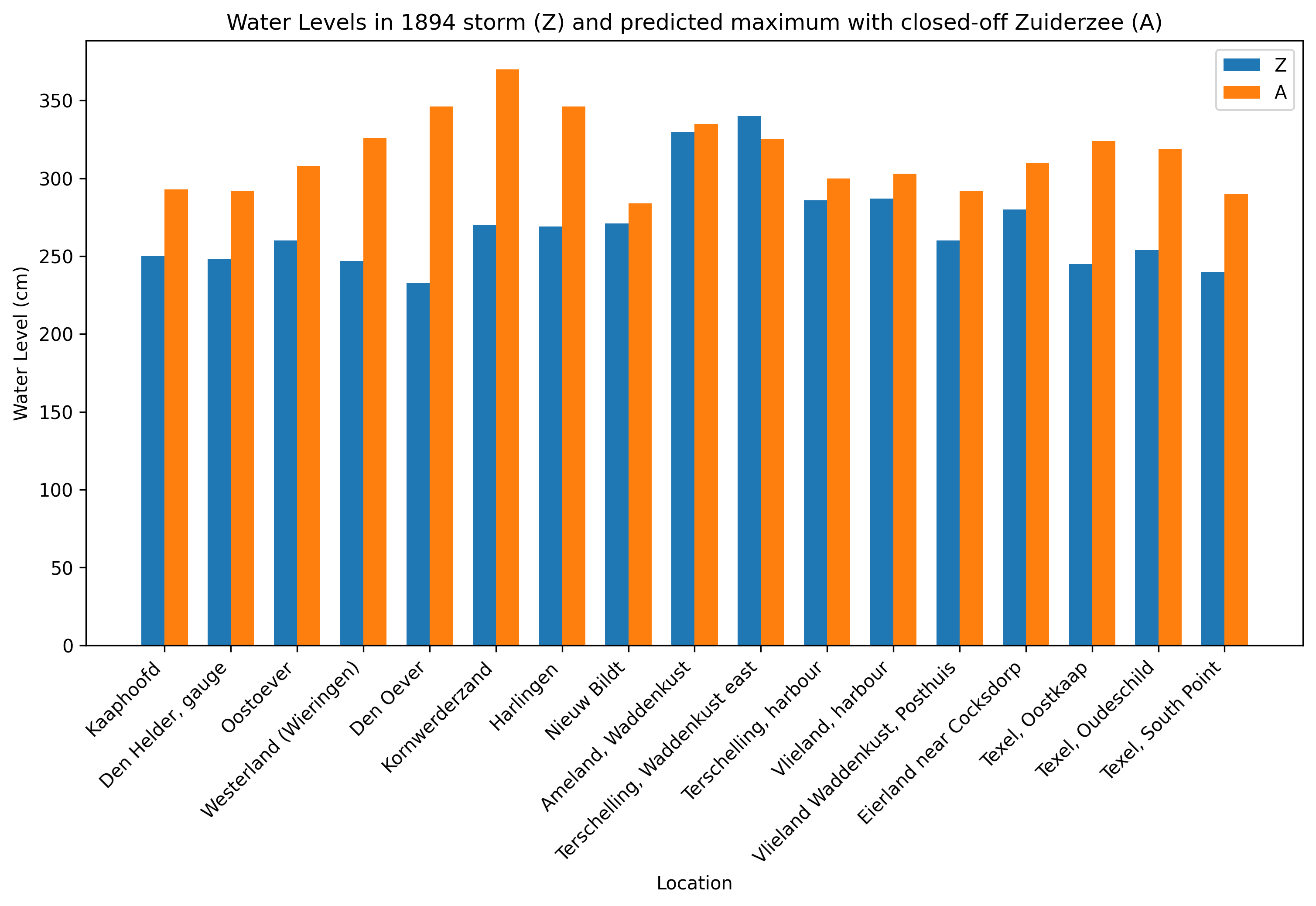
Observed storm surge water levels in 1894 for various locations in the Netherlands, and calculated levels of the same locations with a closed-off Zuiderzee

Key to table
Z	Water level reached during storm in 1894
Δ	Calculated level increase with new dike
A	Calculated level with closed-off Zuiderzee
ΔG	Predicted increase in wave run-up.

All values in centimetres. Z and A are in centimetres above NAP (Normaal Amsterdams Peil/Amsterdam Ordnance Datum).

Location of the area or tide gauge	Z	Δ	A	ΔG
Kaaphoofd	250	43	293	0
Den Helder, gauge	248	44	292	0
Oostoever	260	48	308	15
Westerland (Wieringen)	247	79	326	15
Den Oever	233	113	346	25
Kornwerderzand	270	100	370	(15)
Harlingen	269	77	346	15
Nieuw Bildt	271	13	284	5
Ameland, Waddenkust	330	8	335	0
Terschelling, Waddenkust east	340	0	325	0
Terschelling, harbour	286	14	300	0
Vlieland, harbour	287	16	303	0
Vlieland Waddenkust, Posthuis	260	32	292	10
Eierland near Cocksdorp	280	30	310	0
Texel, Oostkaap	245	79	324	10
Texel, Oudeschild	254	65	319	10
Texel, South Point	240	50	290	0

The lower value was based on the assumption that wave run-up in the shallow area near the Frisian coast would be reduced. However, it became evident as early as 1934 that this assumption was incorrect due to the narrowness of the shallow zone. To address this issue, a section of the dike body was removed. Despite these adjustments, a 1937 storm revealed that they were insufficient, leading to an increase in the crest height to 7.4 metres.

Later research on storm surge flood levels in the Netherlands by Pieter Jacobus Wemelsfelder and Johan van Veen, along with the devastating effects of the storm surge of 1953, would bring the reality of such extremely rare cases to light.

In determining the height for the construction of the inner berm, different considerations were employed compared to those for the main dam crest height. The primary requirement for the crest was to ensure the dike would not be breached during the most severe anticipated storm. To achieve this, the crest was designed to be elevated enough so that, at most, only a single wave could reach it. The IJsselmeer side of the dam was designed with a lower factor of safety than the Wadden Sea side, as it was anticipated that even under unfavourable conditions, such as a southwest storm over the IJsselmeer with a high average water level, the waves would not exceed about 3.5 metres above Amsterdam Ordnance Datum. Consequently, the berm was constructed to a height of approximately 4 metres.

The inner berm slope toward the future water level of the IJsselmeer (or Amstelmeer) was designed to be steeper than the outer slope, with a ratio of approximately 1:3. The majority of the dam's core consisted of sand, while boulder clay on the exterior provided resistance against water flow, limiting seepage and enhancing dike breach protection. A layer of armourstone, composed of basalt rock, was utilized on the outer slope.

During construction, the slopes were partially fortified with basalt columns and Belgian block stone Belgische Bloksteen, a block-shaped, hard variety of limestone. Block stone served as a more affordable and widely available alternative to basalt, and the Dutch Government resisted purchasing large quantities of basalt to avoid potential price increases, instead planning to gradually replace the block stone with basalt.

=== World War II ===
On 12 and 13 May 1940 it was the site of the Battle of the Afsluitdijk, where Fort Kornwerderzand became the only Dutch line of defense that successfully withstood a Wehrmacht attack during the conflict, and was one of the few Blitzkrieg defeats suffered by the Wehrmacht.

=== Post-war modernization ===
Following the 1953 storm, a subsequent storm in 1954 caused significant damage to the Afsluitdijk. Although the 1953 water level was not as extreme at the Afsluitdijk as in the southern Netherlands, the intense wave action resulted in severe damage to a large portion of the block stone, which was later replaced by basalt. In response to recommendations from the Deltacommissie, the commission responsible for the Delta Works, it was deemed necessary to elevate the dike level. However, this was considered less urgent compared to the issues in Zeeland after the 1953 storm. A decision was made to prioritize the Delta Works while also incrementally increasing the Afsluitdijk height to 7.4 metres.

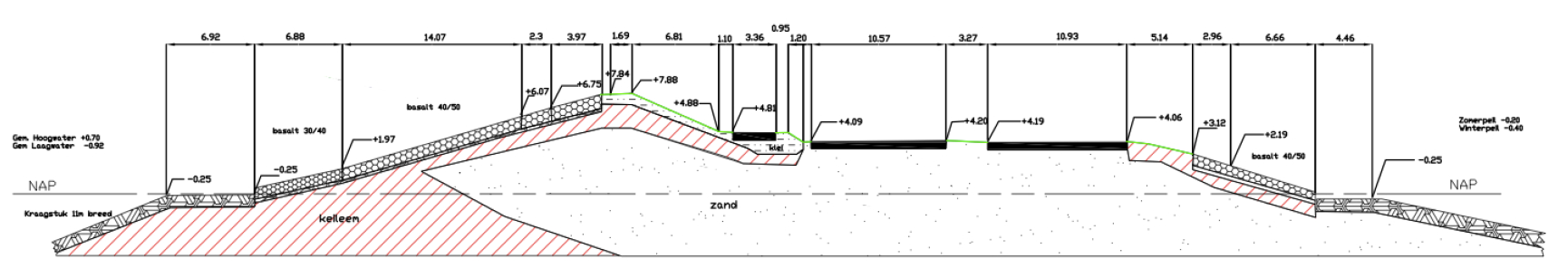
A cross section profile of the Afsluitdijk prior to the upgrade works commenced in 2019

On 23 September 1954, on the centenary of Cornelis Lely, a statue, made by Mari Andriessen, was unveiled by Queen Juliana on the North Holland side of the Afsluitdijk. On May 9, 2007, the statue was relocated near to the Vlieter Monument. The official unveiling, on the occasion of the 75th anniversary of the dyke, was performed on 24 May 2007 by Prince Willem-Alexander.

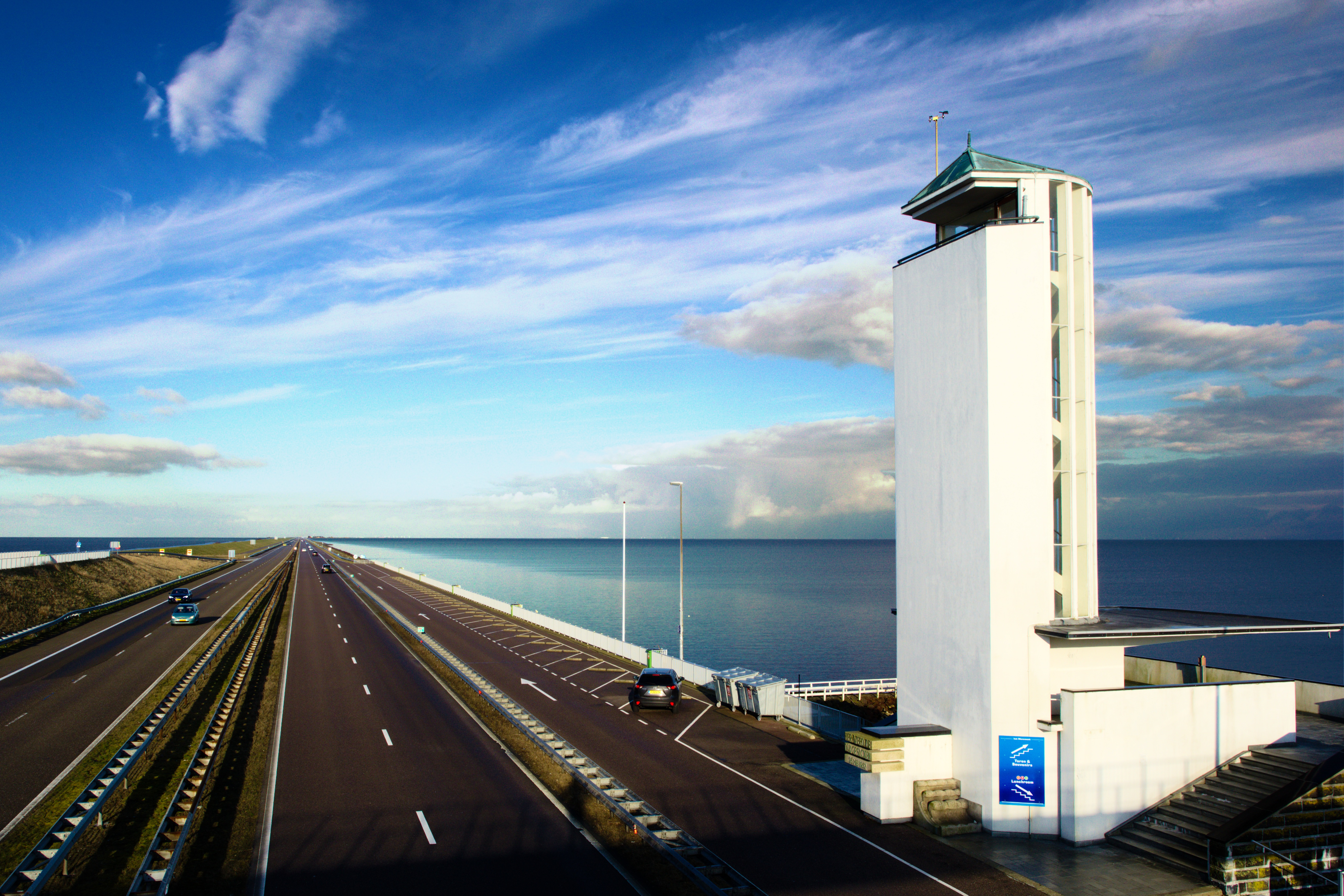
Observation tower as seen from pedestrian bridge

In 2012, the State Secretary for Infrastructure and the Environment, Joop Atsma, issued a statement detailing the factors influencing the decision to replace the locks at Kornwerderzand. A naviduct would have a high construction cost compared with standard locks and bridges, but would benefit the economy by reducing delays. After the cost–benefit analysis of all potential solutions was considered, a decision was made to strengthen the existing locks. However, it is quite possible that a naviduct will be built to replace the locks when they reach the end of their useful life in 2050. The work started in April 2020 and was planned to take three years; during the work, the highway remained in operation, however the bicycle path was closed.

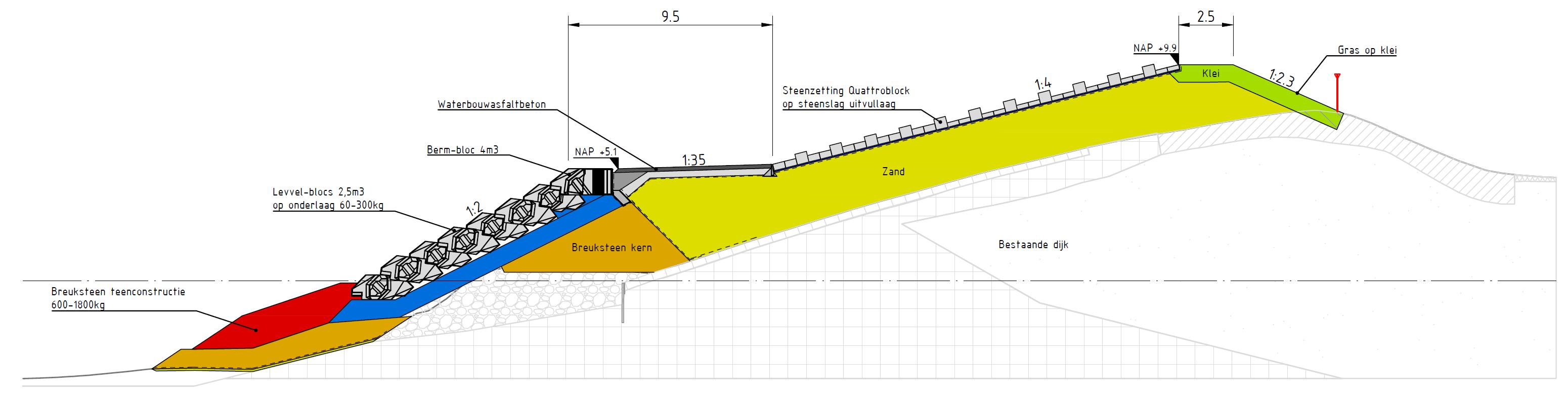
The new (2022) profile (Den Oever - Kornwerderzand)

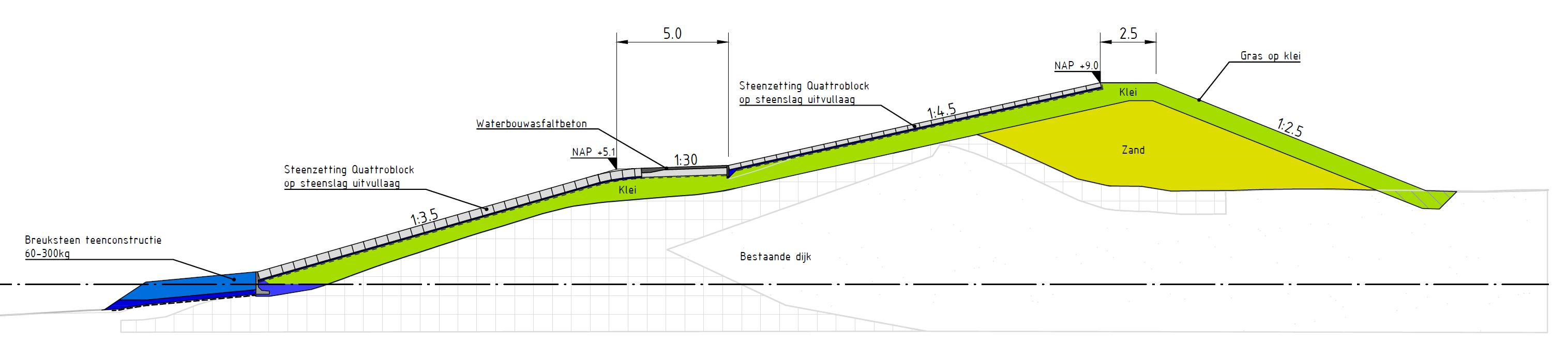
The new (2022) profile (Kornwerderzand - Friese Kust)

Rijkswaterstaat (the ministry which oversees the dyke) further increased the height of the dyke beginning in 2018. As part of the renovation program, a series of artistic projects were incorporated into the dyke, known as the "Icoon Afsluitdijk." Daan Roosegaarde led the artistic aspects. The three designs of light and interaction developed by Roosegaarde and his team are entitled Gates of Light, Windvogel and Glowing Nature. The improvement of the main dike body was completed in 2022. Additional works (the fish migration river, new locks and the pumping station) were at that moment not yet ready.

Provision for a railway line linking North Holland and Friesland (between Anna Paulowna and Harlingen) had been included on the Afsluitdijk, in the form of a linear reservation, along with extra drawbridge abutments at the locks. However, construction of the line was never undertaken by the Dutch track operator (ProRail), for reasons of cost and relative lack of benefits. The reservation and abutments for the rail line were utilized instead for a second carriageway for the dyke's two-lane highway in the 1970s, transforming the latter into today's four-lane A7 motorway.

== Highway ==
The causeway highway running on the Afsluitsdijk is the Rijksweg A7. It is a major road connection between Amsterdam and the rest of North Holland with the northern Dutch provinces of Friesland and Groningen, and on towards northern Germany. Approximately 20,000 vehicles drive on the Afsluitsdijk daily.

The highway on the Afsluitdijk was the initial demonstration site for a 130 km/h (81 mph) speed limit in the Netherlands in 2011.

== See also ==
- Zuiderzee Museum
