= Belter =

Belter may refer to:

== People ==
- Herbert Belter (1929–1951), East German resistance activist
- William Belter (1926-1999), American lawyer and politician

== Music ==
- A singer who applies the singing style of vocal belting
- "Belter" (Gerry Cinnamon song) (2017)
- "Belter" (Powderfinger song) (1998)

== Other uses ==
- Belter (board game), a 1979 board wargame
- Belter (play-by-mail game), a science fiction space opera game
- Belter, in science fiction, a resident of the Asteroid Belt
  - Belter (Niven), a resident of the asteroid belt in Larry Niven's Known Space
  - Belter, a resident of the asteroid belt in James S. A. Corey's The Expanse
- Belter Creole, a constructed language made by Nick Farmer for the TV series The Expanse

== See also ==
- Belt (disambiguation)
