= Leipzig School (translation) =

Institute of Applied Linguistics and Translatology
- Institut für Angewandte Linguistik und Translatologie
- Type: Public research school
- Parent institution: Leipzig University
- Location: Leipzig, Saxony, Germany
- Website: www.philol.uni-leipzig.de/en/institut-fuer-angewandte-linguistik-und-translatologie/institut/history

The Leipzig School of Translation Studies (German: Leipziger Übersetzungswissenschaftliche Schule), or simply Leipzig School, contemporarily named the Institute of Applied Linguistics and Translatology (German: Institut für Angewandte Linguistik und Translatologie) is the denomination of a group of translation and interpreting scholars centered in the Leipzig University.

Notable during the years of the Cold War, it had a close relationship with the Moscow School (Barkhudarov, Komissarov, Shveitser, Kolshanskiy, etc.). It influenced the international debate on translation studies; one of its main developments was communicative equivalence, based on linguistics, semiotics and communication theory.

Among its most prominent members are Otto Kade, Gert Jäger and Albrecht Neubert. In 1965, with his doctoral dissertation Subjektive und objektive Faktoren im Übersetzungsprozeß (Subjective and objective factors in the translation process) Kade sought to go beyond the limits of a purely linguistic approach to interpretation and translation; his dissertation is considered one of the most significant achievements of translation theory in Germany, and also the first milestone of the Leipzig School.

== History ==
Translator and interpreter training in Leipzig dates back to 1937, when a Dolmetscherinstitut (institute for interpreters) was founded at the Handelsschule Leipzig (Leipzig School of Commerce) with forty students. After the Second World War, the institute was integrated into the university's Faculty of Economics and Social Sciences but was then closed by the Soviet Military Administration. Beginning in late 1950, translation teaching resumed at the Leipziger Fremdsprachenschule under Otto Kade, who became its pedagogical director, and in 1951 the school offered courses in English, French, Russian, Polish, Czech, and temporarily Chinese. 1953 saw the re-establishment of the Pädagogisches Institut Leipzig and, in 1956, it became the independent Dolmetscher-Institut of the Karl-Marx-Universität. Albrecht Neubert joined the institute alongside Otto Kade and Gert Jäger.

Between 1965 and 1991, the group organized five major conferences titled Grundfragen der Übersetzungswissenschaft (“Fundamental Questions of Translation Studies”), the first of which was the earliest international conference devoted solely to translation theory. The conference is noted as having initiated lasting cooperation between the Moscow School of Translation and other Eastern Bloc institutions, especially in former Czechoslovakia, where scholar Jiří Levý strongly influenced Kade's writings.

Following the Mauerfall and German reunification, the strong presence of translation studies in Leipzig continued at the Institute for Applied Linguistics and Translatology (IALT) of Leipzig University. The IALT describes itself as carrying on a “sixty-year tradition of language-mediation research and teaching.”

== Theoretical Foundations ==
=== Translation as Mediated Communication ===
The Leipzig School rooted translation in within the concept of Sprachmittlung (linguistic mediation), itself informed by communication theory, semiotics, and linguistics more broadly. Kade defined translation as kommunikativ äquivalente Sprachmittlung (communicatively equivalent linguistic mediation), emphasizing that translation is a zweisprachig vermittelte Kommunikation (bilingual mediated communication) rather than a simple mechanical transfer of words.

Although Kade discussed the process in linguistic terms, his approach was not solely structuralist. In his early work on semiotics, he argued that translators constantly adjust their mediation strategies based on pragmatic constraints and communicative goals, something noted by later scholars.

This model of linguistic mediation was further built upon by incorporating elements from text linguistics and pragmatics. Translation could, with this additions, also be viewed as a text-bound operation, in which the translator evaluates the text's function, as well as contextual and/or situational parameters.

=== Terminology and Classification ===
The scholars of the Leipzig School worked to establish common terminology:

- Translation referred to the overall process,
- Translat referred to the resulting text, and
- Translator referred to the acting agent.

Central to their model was the previously described concept of Sprachmittlung (linguistic mediation), conceived by Jäger as the superordinate category of all interlingual and intralingual communicative acts. He differentiated between kommunikativ äquivalente Sprachmittlung (communicatively equivalent linguistic mediation), which included translation and interpreting, and kommunikativ heterovalente Sprachmittlung (content-modifying mediation).

This predates later concepts such as Skopos theory, which similarly classifies translations based on communicative purpose. Jäger argued that every translation involves a relation between source and target texts, which is shaped by more so by communicative relevance and situational constraints than mere substitutions.

=== Communicative Equivalence ===
The concept of kommunikative Äquivalenz (communicative equivalence) is a key component the Leipzig School's theories. Whilst arguably rooted in linguistic formalism, the Leipzig School and its proponents maintain that the use equivalence in a pragmatic sense, suggesting a translation is equivalent when it fulfills the same communicative function for its audience as the source text does for its original readers, and therefore must take context, intention, and audience orientation into account.

== Research Focus and Innovations ==
The Leipzig School's work combined linguistics, semiotics, and communication theory. Among its main achievements are:

- Establishing translation as an autonomous academic discipline within the post-war university system of the German Democratic Republic.
- Developing analytic models of the translation process.
- Introducing the concept of zweisprachig vermittelte Kommunikation (bilingual mediated communication).
- Systematizing translator training and terminology for translation research.

Didactically, translator training at the Leipzig School included a structured combination of guided practice, text analysis, and controlled self-study phases, foreshadowing modern competence-based training in translation pedagogy. The Leipzig School linked the professions of translation and interpretation to linguistic theory, thereby rooting professional practice in the broader field of linguistics.

== Reception and Criticism ==
During the Cold War, the Leipzig School played host to students from other socialist countries, carrying the Leipzig Schools's terminology and concepts abroad, including in the USSR itself. Despite its significance, however, the Leipzig School remained largely unknown in Western scholarship for decades. Several key reasons for this include:

1. Language barrier and Cold War division: most publications appeared only in German or Russian and were seldom translated.
2. Limited accessibility: many doctoral theses circulated only as typewritten manuscripts in East German academic libraries.
3. Methodological bias: the dominance of cultural and functionalist paradigms in the West marginalized linguistic approaches.

In some ways, the Leipzig School's works can be seen as a precursor of functional and communicative theories, bridging Soviet semiotic models and Western pragmatic thought. Contemporary scholars increasingly recognize its value in institutionalizing translation studies as a linguistically grounded discipline.

== Key People ==
- Otto Kade (1927–1980): German specialist in Russian language and translation scholar
- Albrecht Neubert (1930–2017): German translation scholar and lecturer in English language
- Gert Jäger (1935-dato): German translation scholar and a specialist in the Polish and Czech languages
- Heide Schmidt (1943–1996): German translation scholar
- Gerd Wotjak (1942–2024): German linguist and translation scholar

== Influence and Contemporary Developments ==
In 1999, the Leipzig School was reorganized as the Institute for Applied Linguistics and Translatology (IALT), which continues to host the Leipziger Internationale Konferenz zu Grundfragen der Translatologie. Modern research at the IALT extends into areas such as cognitive translation studies, audiovisual translation, linguistic variation, minority languages, and translation policy.

The Leipzig School serves as one of the first coherent German-language framework of translation studies and one of the earliest systematic attempts to define translation as a scientific field. Its focus of rooting itself within the broader field of linguistics provided the methodological foundations upon which later functionalist and descriptive paradigms could build. The Leipzig School and later IALT remain relevant for understanding the evolution of translation as both an academic discipline and as a communicative act.
