= Belt =

Belt or The Belt may refer to:

== Apparel ==
- Belt (clothing), a leather or fabric band worn around the waist
- Championship belt, a type of trophy used primarily in combat sports
- Colored belts, such as a black belt or red belt, worn by martial arts practitioners to signify rank in the kyū ranking system

== Geology ==
- Orogenic belt
- Greenstone belt
- A large-scale linear or curved array or belt of igneous rocks (e.g. Transscandinavian Igneous Belt)
- A large-scale linear or curved array of mineral deposits (e.g. Bolivian tin belt)
- Paired metamorphic belts

== Mechanical and vehicular ==
- Belt (mechanical), a looped strip of material used to link multiple rotating shafts
- Conveyor belt, a device for transporting goods along a fixed track
- Belt manlift, a device for moving people between floors in a building or grain elevator.
- Seat belt, a safety device in automobiles and on the plane
- Timing belt, part of an internal combustion engine
- Serpentine belt, move accessories of a combustion engine.
- Belt track, a type of track used on Caterpillar-style vehicles
- Belt armor, a layer of heavy metal armor plated onto or within the outer hulls of warships
- Belt (firearms), a type of ammunition used in light machine guns, like the M240 and Mk 48.
- Steel belt, a type of conveyor belt

== Places ==
- Belt, North Holland
- Belt, Montana, United States
- Belt Parkway, a series of highways around New York City, United States
- Danish belts, several straits in and around Denmark:
  - Great Belt
  - Little Belt
  - Fehmarn Belt
- Any of several informally defined elongated regions of the United States and elsewhere
- Belts, Yiddish name of Bălți, Moldova
- Il-Belt, Maltese name of Valletta, Malta

== Astronomy ==
- Asteroid belt, a region of the solar system between Mars and Jupiter
- Gould Belt, a partial ring of stars representing the local spiral arm to which the Sun belongs
- Kuiper belt, a region of the solar system beyond the orbit of Neptune
- Orion's Belt

== Other uses ==
- Belt (surname)
- Belting (music), a singing technique
- The Belt (film), a 1989 erotic drama film
- The Belt (album), an album by In the Valley Below
- Judas belt, a firework
- Green belt, a policy and land use designation used in land use planning
- Belt problem, a mathematics problem
- Belt Supergroup, a group of Mesoproterozoic sedimentary rocks
- Belt Publishing, an American publisher
- Belt, fictional character in The Croods

== See also ==
- Balteus (disambiguation)
- Category:Belts (clothing)
- Below the belt
- Beltway
