= Komissarov =

Komissarov (Komissaroff, Komissarow, Russian: Комиссаров, or Komissarova (feminine; Russian: Комиссарова), is a Slavic surname, which may refer to:

- Daniel Semyonovich Komissarov (1907–2008), Russian Iranologist and distinguished professor of Persian literature
- Vilen Naumovich Komissarov (1924–2005) Russian linguist, translator, and professor
- Maria Komissarova (born 1990), Russian freestyle skier
- Oksana Komissarova (born 1964), Russian swimmer
