= Leipzig University =

University in Leipzig, Germany

Coordinates: 51°20′20″N 12°22′43″E

- Universität Leipzig
- Seal of the university
- Latin: Alma Mater Lipsiensis
- Motto: Aus Tradition Grenzen überschreiten (German)
- Motto in English: Crossing boundaries out of tradition
- Type: Public research university
- Established: 2 December 1409; 616 years ago
- Affiliations: Utrecht Network; German U15
- Budget: EUR 408.9 million
- Rector: Eva Inés Obergfell
- Academic staff: 3,234
- Administrative staff: 1,962
- Students: 29,459
- Location: Leipzig, Saxony, Germany
- Campus: Urban
- Colours: Red Light Blue
- Website: uni-leipzig.de

- Location within Germany Location within Saxony

Leipzig University (German: Universität Leipzig), in Leipzig in Saxony, Germany, is one of the world's oldest universities and Germany's second-oldest university (by consecutive years of existence). The university was founded on 2 December 1409 by Frederick I, Elector of Saxony and his brother William II, Margrave of Meissen, and originally comprised the four scholastic faculties. Since its inception, the university has engaged in teaching and research for over 600 years without interruption.

The university's alumni include 55 prime ministers and presidents, notably Angela Merkel who served as Chancellor of Germany from 2005 to 2021. The university is also associated with 19 Nobel laureates, most recently with Leipzig faculty professor Svante Pääbo who won the Nobel Prize for Medicine in 2022. Other alumni include Gottfried Wilhelm von Leibniz, Johann Wolfgang von Goethe, Werner Heisenberg, Friedrich Nietzsche, Robert Schumann, Richard Wagner, Theodor Mommsen, Wilhelm Ostwald, Cai Yuanpei, Edward Teller, Gustav Stresemann and Tycho Brahe, Georgius Agricola.

== History ==
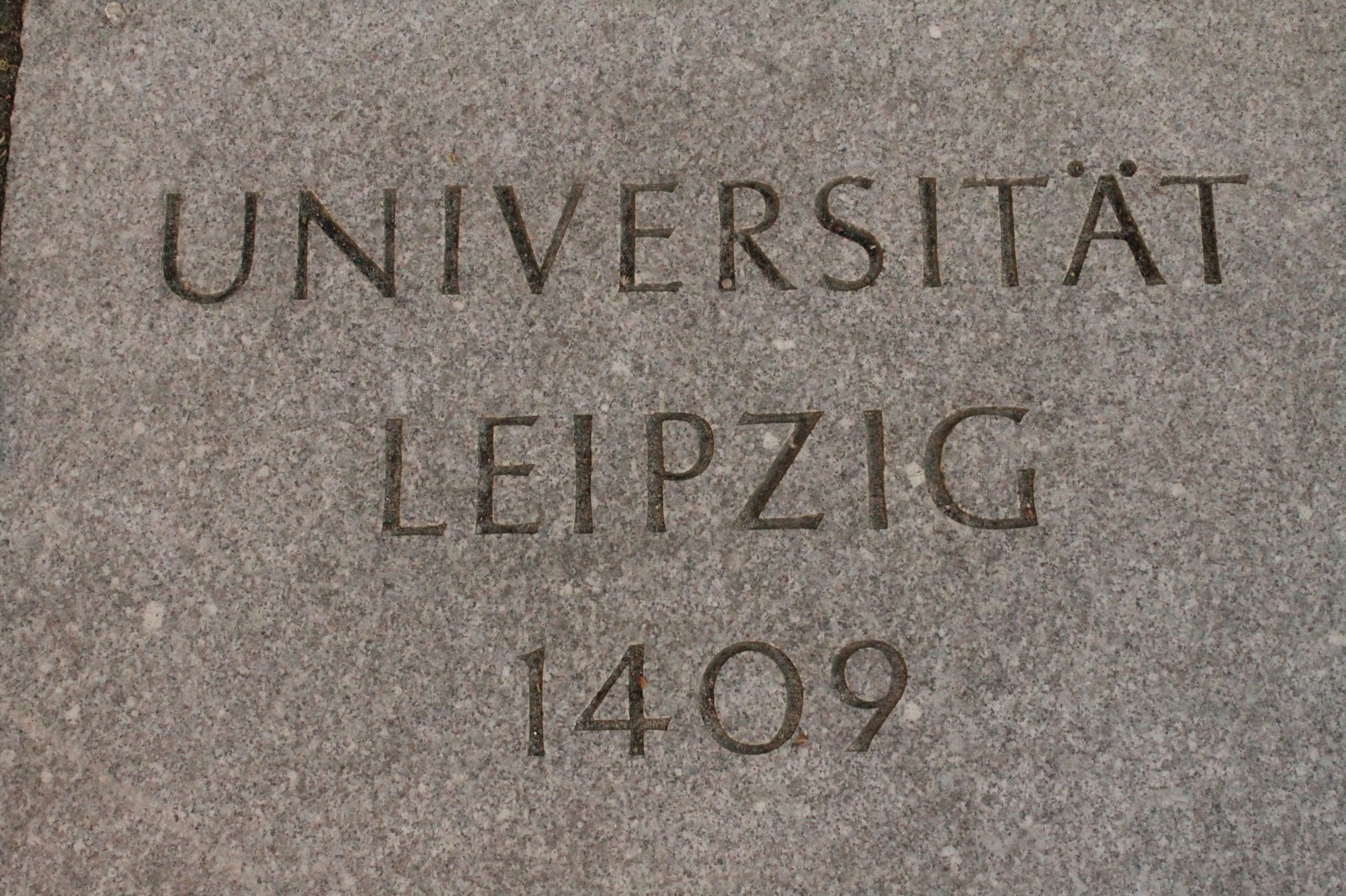
Memorial stone to the foundation of Leipzig University

=== Founding and development until 1900 ===
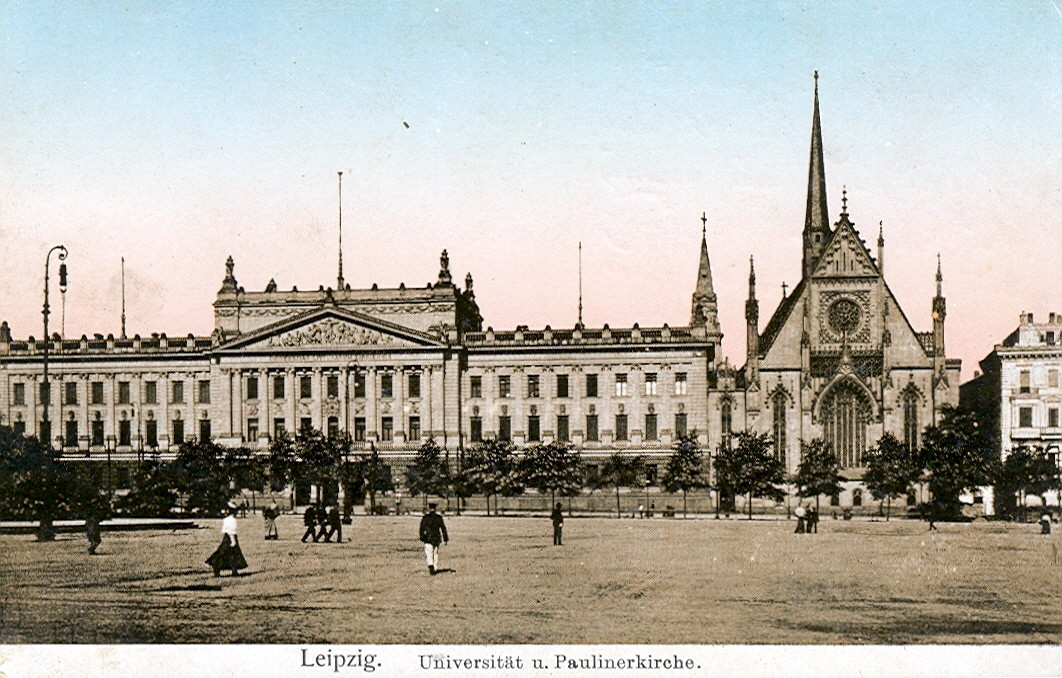
Leipzig University main building (1917). It was demolished by the socialist administration in 1968.

The university was modelled on the University of Prague, from which the German-speaking faculty members withdrew to Leipzig after the Jan Hus crisis and the Decree of Kutná Hora. The Alma mater Lipsiensis opened in 1409, after it had been officially chartered by Pope Alexander V in his Bull of Acknowledgment on 9 September of that year. Its first rector was Johannes Otto von Münsterberg. From its foundation, the Paulinerkirche served as the university church. After the Reformation, the church and the monastery buildings were donated to the university in 1544. In order to secure independent and sustainable funding, the university was endowed with the lordship over nine villages east of Leipzig (university villages). It kept this status for nearly 400 years until land reforms were carried out in the 19th century.

Like many European universities, Leipzig University was structured into colleges (collegia) responsible for organising accommodation and collegiate lecturing. Among the colleges of Leipzig were the Small College, the Large College, the Red College (Rotes Kolleg, also known as the New College), the college of our Lady (Frauenkolleg) and the Pauliner-College (Pauliner Kolleg). There were also private residential halls (bursen, see English 'bursaries'). The colleges had jurisdiction over their members. The college structure was abandoned later and today only the names survive.

During the first centuries, the university grew slowly and was a rather regional institution. This changed, however, during the 19th century when the university became a world-class institution of higher education and research. At the end of the 19th century, important scholars such as Bernhard Windscheid (one of the fathers of the German Civil Code) and Wilhelm Ostwald (viewed as a founder of modern physical chemistry) taught at Leipzig.

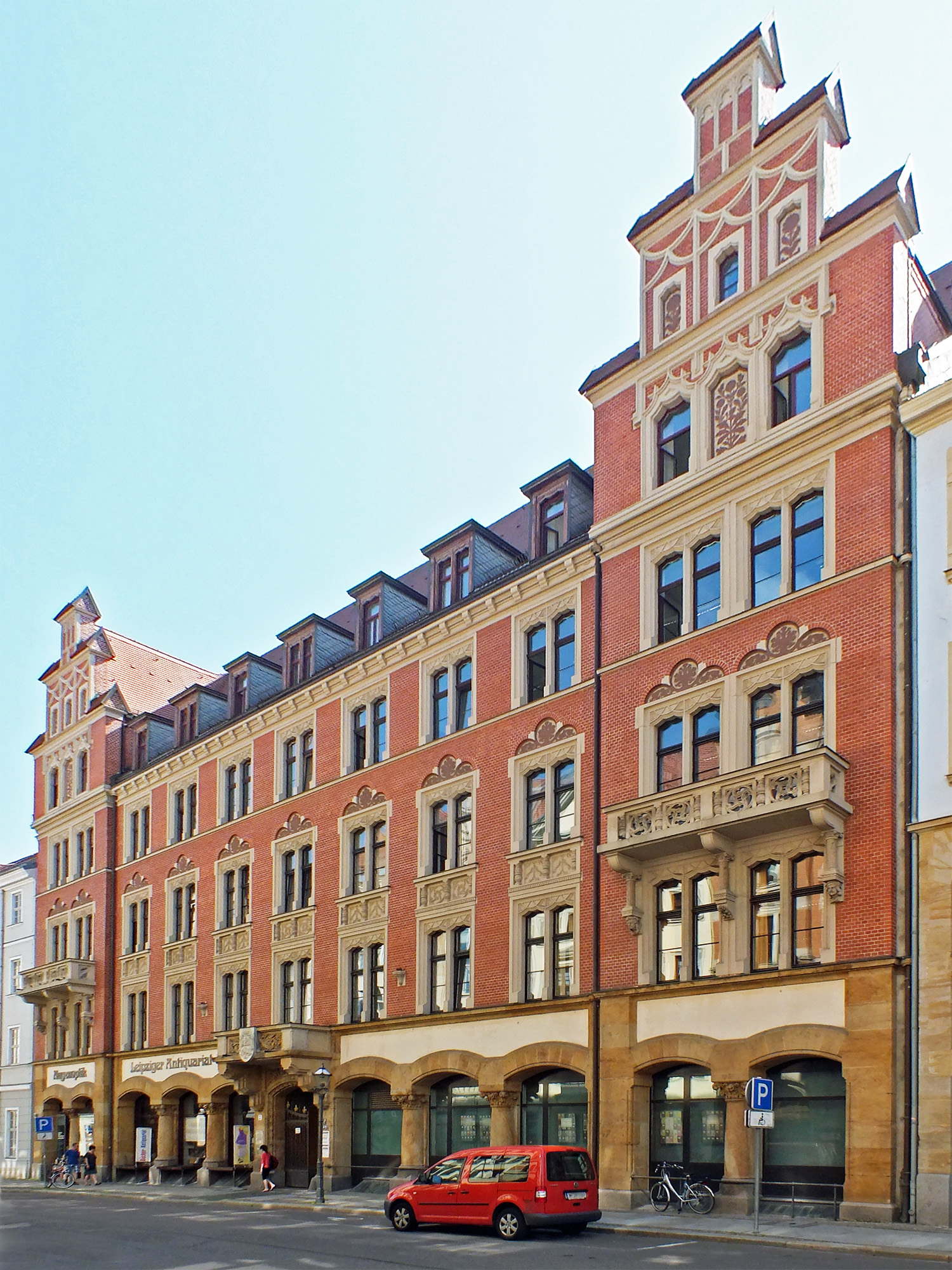
Formerly organized as a collegiate university, the Red College of Leipzig University was established in the 16th century.

Leipzig University was one of the first German universities to allow women to register as "guest students". (Note: While with this status, woman could not take part in university governance, they could study and graduate with fully valid academic degrees.) At its general assembly in 1873, the Allgemeiner Deutscher Frauenverein thanked Leipzig University and the University of Prague for allowing women to attend as guest students. This was the year that the first woman in Germany obtained her JD, Johanna von Evreinov.

During the decline and dissolution of the Ottoman Empire in the 19th and first decade of 20th century together with some other German universities Leipzig University turned into one of the centers of higher education for state administrations and elites of newly independent Balkan states (Romania, Greece, Bulgaria and Serbia) educating over 5,500 students from the region in 1859–1909 period.

Until the beginning of the Second World War, Leipzig University attracted a number of renowned scholars and later Nobel Prize laureates, including Paul Ehrlich, Felix Bloch, Werner Heisenberg and Sin-Itiro Tomonaga. Many of the university's alumni became important scientists.

=== Nazi period ===
Under Nazi rule many degrees of Jews were cancelled. Some were later reinstated as Karl-Marx University degrees by the GDR. Noteworthy Nazis, such as Max Clara (chair of anatomy) taught at the university and were appointed to positions with great authority.

The university was kept open throughout World War II, even after the destruction of its buildings. During the war the acting rector, Erich Maschke, described the continuation of the university in a memo on 11 May 1945, announcing the vote for a new rector:

Since 4 December 1943 a fixed determination not to abandon the Leipzig University in the most difficult hour of its more than five-hundred-year history has bonded the professors with each other and with the students. The special task of repairing the damage caused by air attacks has now broadened out to the more general duty to save the continuity of our university and preserve its substance, at the very least its indestructible kernel, through the crisis that has now reached its fullest stage. After the destruction of most of the buildings and the majority of its libraries, this kernel is represented by the professoriate alone. This is what must be preserved as the great repository of value in the university.

By the end of the war 60 per cent of the university's buildings and 70 per cent of its books had been destroyed.

=== The university under the German Democratic Republic ===
The university reopened after the war on 5 February 1946, but it was affected by the uniformity imposed on social institutions in the Soviet occupation zone. In 1948 the freely elected student council was disbanded and replaced by Free German Youth members. The chairman of the Student Council, Wolfgang Natonek, and other members were arrested and imprisoned, but the university was also a nucleus of resistance. Thus began the Belter group, with flyers for free elections. The head of the group, Herbert Belter, was executed in 1951 in Moscow. The German Democratic Republic was created in 1949, and in 1953 for Karl Marx Year the university was renamed by its government the Karl Marx University, Leipzig after Karl Marx. In 1968, the partly damaged Augusteum, including Johanneum and Albertinum and the intact Paulinerkirche, were demolished to make way for a redevelopment of the university, carried out between 1973 and 1978. The dominant building of the university was the University Tower (now City-Hochhaus Leipzig), built between 1968 and 1972 in the form of an open book.

=== After the reunification of Germany ===
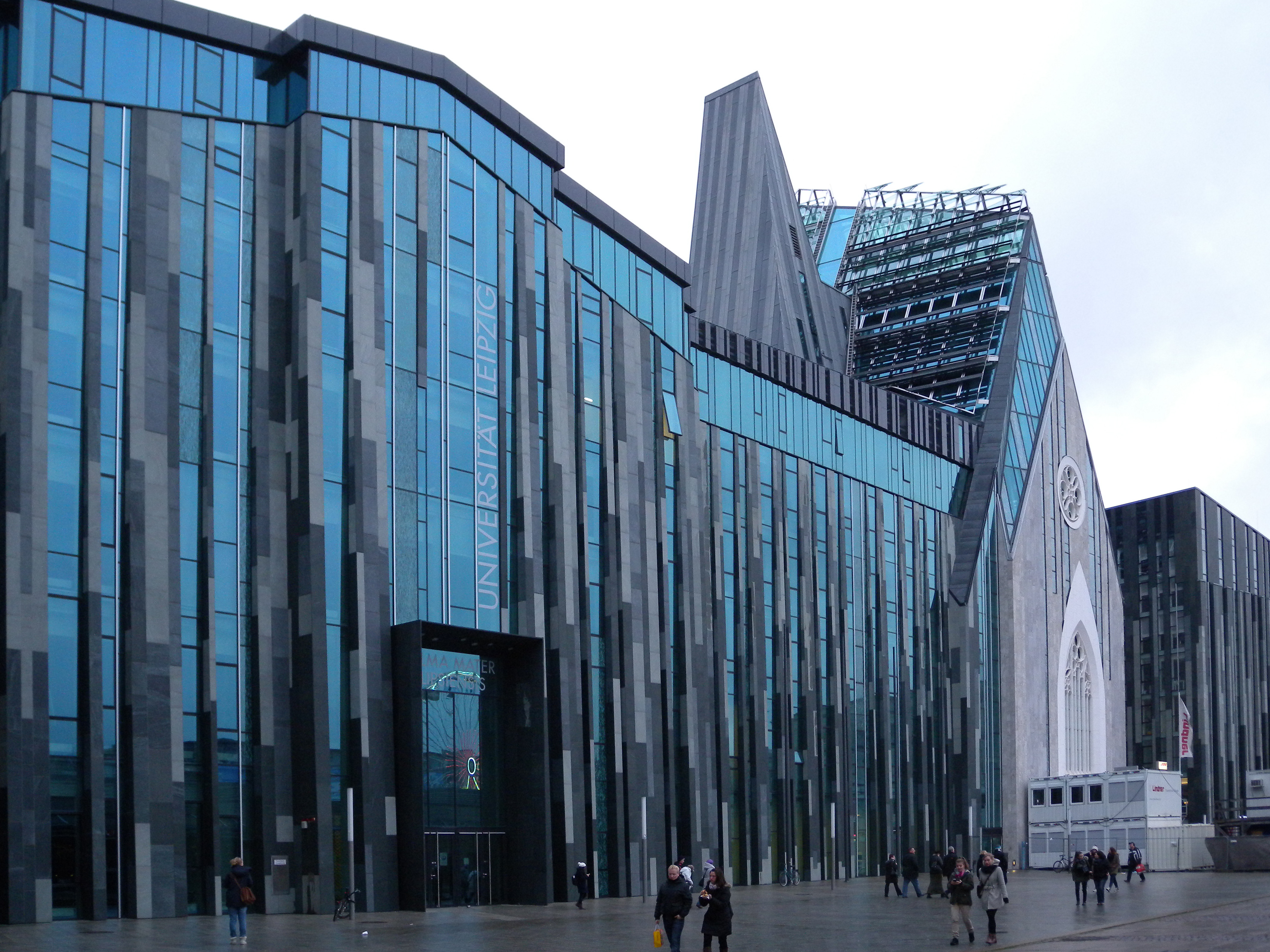
Main building of Leipzig University since 2012, the Augusteum at Augustusplatz

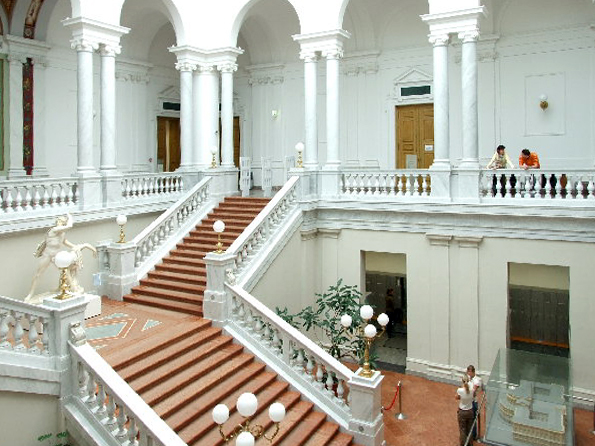
Leipzig's classicist university library, the Bibliotheca Albertina

In 1991, following the reunification of Germany, the university's name was restored to the original Leipzig University (Alma mater lipsiensis). The government also funded a new Faculty of Sport Science with the reunification, absorbing the facilities and programs of East Germany's premier sports university Deutsche Hochschule für Körperkultur (DHfK).

With the delivery of the University Tower to a private user, the university was forced to spread some faculties over several locations in the city. It controversially redesigned its historical centre at the Augustusplatz. In 2002, Behet Bonzio received the second prize in the architectural competition; a first prize was not awarded by the jury. A lobby with partial support of the provincial government called for the rebuilding of St. Paul's Church and Augusteum. This caused the resistance of the university leadership, the majority of the students and population of Leipzig. On 24 March 2004 a jury chose a design by Dutch architect Erick van Egeraat, which was well received by almost all parties. He recalls the outer form of the St. Paul's Church (today called Paulinum) and Augusteum, and abstracted the original building complex. Renovations began in the summer of 2005.

In 2008 the university was able to prevail in the nationwide "Initiative of Excellence" of Germany and it was granted the graduate school "BuildMoNa: Leipzig School of Natural Sciences – Building with Molecules and Nano-objects". In addition, the university was able to receive grants from the Saxon excellence initiative for the "Life" project – a project that tries to explore common diseases more effectively. Also in 2008 the "Bach Archive" was associated with the university. In 2009, the Leipzig University celebrated its 600th anniversary with over 300 scientific and cultural lectures and exhibitions, reflecting the role of the university's research and teaching from its beginning.

== Campus ==
The university's urban campus comprises several locations. All in all, the university is spread across 38 locations in Leipzig. The main buildings in the city center (district Mitte) are still located on the same land plots as the earliest university buildings in 1409. The university's buildings in the center of Leipzig underwent substantial reconstruction from 2005, the new university's main building being drafted by Dutch architect Erick van Egeraat. The estimated total cost for the renovation project is 140 million euros. The new buildings were scheduled to be completed in 2009/2010, in time for the university's 600th anniversary celebrations.

Besides the faculties and other teaching institutions, several other bodies serve the university: the University Library, a university archive and administration, numerous museums (e.g. the Museum for Music Instruments and the Museum of Ancient Egypt) and the university hospital. The university's Leipzig Botanical Garden, the second-oldest botanical garden in Europe. was established in 1542. The university's Musical Instrument Museum includes one of the world's three surviving pianos built by Bartolomeo Cristofori, the piano's inventor. Five other Cristofori instruments are included in the museum's collections.

Key Central institutions of the university are

- Centre for Biotechnology and Biomedicine
- Career Service
- German Institute for Literature
- German Centre for Integrative Biodiversity Research (iDiv) Halle-Jena-Leipzig
- Higher Education Didactics Centre Saxony
- Kustodie (Art Collection)
- Leipzig University Music
- Leipzig Research Centre Global Dynamics
- Research Academy Leipzig
- Language Centre
- Studienkolleg Sachsen (The university's pathway and entrance examination provider)
- Translational Centre for Regenerative Medicine Leipzig
- University Archive
- University Library
- University Computer Centre
- Centre for University Sport
- Centre for Teacher Training and School Research
- Centre for Media and Communication

== Library ==
The University Library of Leipzig was established in 1543. It is one of the oldest German university libraries and it serves as a source of literature and information for the Leipzig University as well as the general public in the region. Its extensive historical and special collections are nationally and internationally recognized. The library consists of the main building "Bibliotheca Albertina" and forty branches situated near their respective academic institutions. The current stock comprises 5 million volumes and about 7,700 periodicals. Collections range from important medieval and modern manuscripts to incunabula, papyri, autographs, ostraka and coins.

The Apel Codex, a manuscript of 16th century music, is housed in the Leipzig University library, as well as the Papyrus Ebers.

The Leipzig University Library also owns parts of the Codex Sinaiticus, a Bible manuscript from the 4th century, brought from Sinai in 1843 by Constantin von Tischendorf. Papyrus Ebers is the longest and oldest surviving medical manuscript from ancient Egypt, dated to around 1600 BC. The Codex contains large parts of the Old Testament and a complete New Testament in ancient Greek, and is one of the most important known manuscripts of the Greek Old Testament and the New Testament. It is the oldest fully preserved copy of the New Testament.

The Oriental Manuscripts of the Leipzig University Library are around 3,200 oriental manuscripts.

Some of the University Library locations in Leipzig are:

- Bibliotheca Albertina at Beethovenstraße 6
- Campus Library at Universitätsstr. 3
- Library of Deutsches Literaturinstitut at Wächterstr. 34
- Library of Arts at Dittrichring 18–20
- Library of Musicology at Neumarkt 9–19
- Library of Law at Burgstr. 27
- Library of Medicine at Johannisallee 34
- Library of Medicine at Käthe-Kollwitz-Str. 82
- Library of Veterinary Medicine at the Tierkliniken 5
- Library of Biosciences at Talstr. 35
- Library of Chemistry and Physics at Johannisallee 29
- Library of Earth Sciences at Talstr. 35
- Library of Geography at Johannisallee 19
- Library of Archaeology, Prehistory and Ancient History at Ritterstr. 14
- Library of Oriental Studies at Schillerstr. 6
- Library of Sports Science at Jahnallee 59

In addition to the university library, one of the two centers of the German National Library is based at Leipzig, the collections of which are open to use for academic research.

== Faculties ==
The original four facilities were the Faculty of Arts, Theology, Medicine, and Law. As of November 2021, the university comprises the following 14 faculties with institutes and centers associated with each one.

Faculty of Chemistry

- Institute of Analytical Chemistry
- Institute of Bioanalytical Chemistry
- Institute of Chemical Technology
- Institute of Inorganic Chemistry
- Institute of Organic Chemistry
- Wilhelm Ostwald Institut of Physical and Theoretical Chemistry

Faculty of Economics and Management Science

- Institute of Accounting, Finance and Taxation (IUFB)
- Institute of Building Design and Management (IGB)
- Institute of Business Education and Management Training (IFW)
- Institute of Economic Policy (IWP)
- Institute of Empirical Economic Research (IEW)
- Institute of Information Systems
- Institute of Infrastructure and Resource Management (IIRM)
- Institute of Insurance Science (IVL)
- Institute of Public Finance and Public Management (PFPM)
- Institute of Real Estate Management (IIM)
- Institute of Service and Relationship Management (ISRM)
- Institute of Theoretical Economics (ITVWL)
- Institute of Trade and Banking (IHB)
- Institute of Urban Development and Construction Management (ISB)

Faculty of Education

- Institute of Educational Sciences
- Institute of Pre-Primary and Primary Education
- Institute of Special and Inclusive Education

Faculty of History, Arts and Regional Studies

- Department of History
- Institute of African Studies
- Institute of Ancient Near Eastern Studies
- Institute of Anthropology
- Institute of Art Education
- Institute of Art History
- Institute of East Asian Studies
- Institute of Egyptology
- Institute of Musicology
- Institute of Oriental Studies
- Institute of South and Central Asian Studies
- Institute of the Study of Religions
- Institute of Theatre Studies

Faculty of Law

- Ernst Jaeger Institute of Corporate Restructuring and Insolvency Law
- Institute of Broadcasting Law
- Institute of Energy and Regulatory Law
- Institute of Environmental and Planning Law
- Institute of Foreign and European Private and Procedural Law
- Institute of German and International Law of Banking and Capital Markets
- Institute of International Law
- Institute of Labour and Social Law
- Institute of Law and Politics
- Institute of Public International Law, European Law and Foreign Public Law
- Institute of Tax Law
- Institute of the Foundations of Law
- Institute of the Legal Profession

Faculty of Life Sciences

- Institute of Biochemistry
- Institute of Biology
- Wilhelm Wundt Institute for Psychology

Faculty of Mathematics and Computer Science

- Institute of Computer Science
- Institute of Mathematics

Faculty of Medicine

- Carl Ludwig Institute of Physiology
- Centre for Clinical Trials Leipzig
- Centre for Environmental Medicine and Environmental Epidemiology
- Clinical Pharmacology
- Experimental Centre of the Faculty of Medicine
- General Medicine Unit
- Heart Center Leipzig GmbH
- Innovation Center Computer Assisted Surgery (ICCAS)
- Institute for Medical Physics and Biophysics
- Institute of Anatomy
- Institute of Biochemistry (medicine)
- Institute of Legal Medicine
- Institute of Medical Informatics, Statistics and Epidemiology
- Institute of Social Medicine, Occupational Health and Public Health
- Integrated Research and Treatment Center (IFB) AdiposityDiseases
- Interdisciplinary Centre for Clinical Research
- Karl-Sudhoff-Institute of History of Medicine and Science
- LIFE Forschungszentrum für Zivilisationserkrankungen (LIFE)
- Neurological Rehabilitation Centre
- Paul Flechsig Institute for Brain Research
- Rudolf Boehm Institute of Pharmacology and Toxicology

Faculty of Philology

- Institute of American Studies
- Institute of Applied Linguistics and Translatology
- Institute of British Studies
- Institute of Classical Studies and Comparative Literature
- Herder-Institute (German as a Foreign Language)
- Institute of German Language and Literature
- Institute of Linguistics
- Institute of Romance Studies
- Institute of Slavonic Studies
- Institute of Sorbian Studies

Faculty of Physics and Earth Sciences

- Institute of Geography
- Institute of Geophysics and Geology
- Institute of Meteorology
- Peter Debye Institute of Soft Matter Physics
- Felix Bloch Institute of Solid State Physics
- Institute of Theoretical Physics

Faculty of Social Sciences and Philosophy

- Institute of Communication and Media Studies
- Institute of Global and European Studies
- Institute of Philosophy
- Institute of Political Science
- Institute of Sociology
- Institute of the Study of Culture

Faculty of Sport Science

- Institute of Sport Medicine and Prevention
- Institute of General Kinesiology and Athletics Training
- Institute of Movement and Training Science in Sports I
- Institute of Movement and Training Science in Sports II
- Institute of Exercise and Public Health
- Institute of Sport Psychology and Physical Education

Faculty of Theology

- Institute of Church History
- Institute of New Testament Science
- Institute of Old Testament Studies
- Institute of Practical Theology
- Institute of Religious Education
- Institute of Systematic Theology

Faculty of Veterinary Medicine

- Department for birds and reptiles
- Department for horses
- Department for ruminants and swine
- Department for small animal
- Institute of Anatomy, Histology and Embryology
- Institute of Animal Hygiene and Veterinary Public Health
- Institute of Animal Nutrition, Nutrition Diseases and Dietetics
- Institute of Bacteriology and Mycology
- Institute of Food Hygiene
- Institute of Immunology
- Institute of Parasitology
- Institute of Pathology
- Institute of Pharmacology, Pharmacy and Toxicology
- Institute of Physiological Chemistry
- Institute of Physiology
- Institute of Virology
- Oberholz Farm for Teaching and Research

=== Institutes affiliated with the university ===
- International Max Planck Research School- Mathematics in the Sciences (IMPRS MiS), in association with Max Planck Institute for Mathematics in the Sciences
- International Max Planck Research School on Neuroscience of Communication: Function, Structure, and Plasticity, in association with Max Planck Institute for Human Cognitive and Brain Sciences
- International Max Planck Research School "The Leipzig School of Human Origins", in association with Max Planck Institute for Evolutionary Anthropology
- Institute of Non-Classical Chemistry e.V
- Institute for Applied Informatics
- Simon Dubnow Institute for Jewish History and Culture at Leipzig University
- Leipzig Centre for the History and Culture of East Central Europe
- Translational Centre for Regenerative Medicine
- German Centre for Integrative Biodiversity Research (iDiv)
- Institute of East Asian Studies of the Leipzig University
- Institute of Classical Archaeology of the Leipzig University
- Institute for International Law, European Law and Foreign Public Law (InVEA) of the Leipzig University

== Academics ==
Today, the university has 14 faculties. With over 29,000 students, it is Saxony's second-largest university. There are now more than 150 institutes and the university offers 190 study programs leading to Bachelor's degrees, Master's degrees, Staatsexamen, Diplom (equivalent to master's degree) and Ph.D.s. The university offers a number of courses in English and other foreign languages, and there are several programs which have been specially designed for foreign students. Exchange partner universities include the universities of Arizona, Oklahoma, Houston, Alberta, Ohio, and Edinburgh. Traditionally contacts to universities in Eastern Europe and the Far East are strong as well. For example, there are cooperations with leading institutions such as Moscow's Lomonosov University and Renmin University in Beijing.

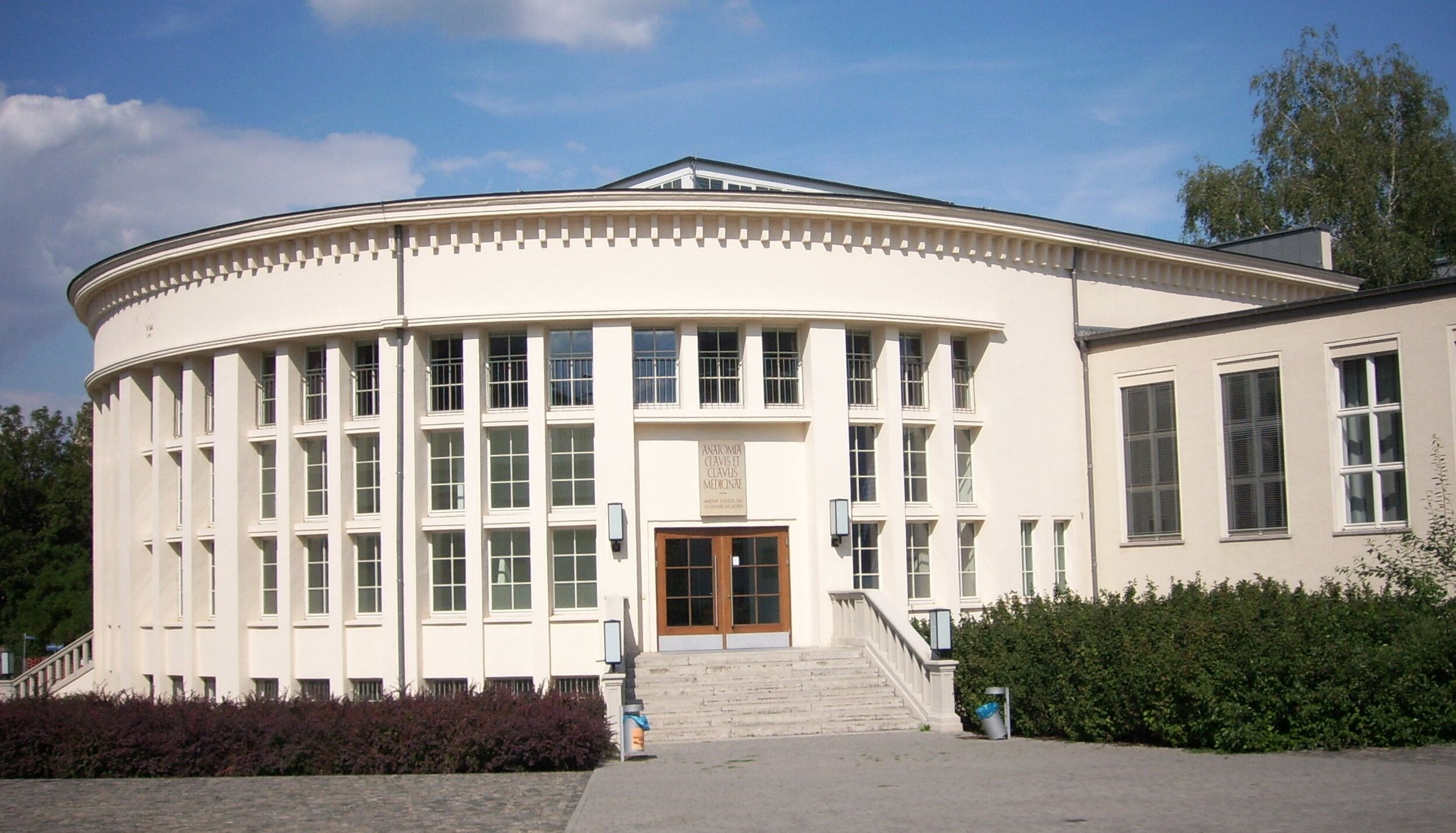
Anatomy auditorium of the Faculty of Medicine

There are several International Master's programs: American Studies, Global Studies, Sustainable Development Studies, SEPT (MBA in SME Promotion) and one Bachelor/Master's/Ph.D. program (International Physics Studies Program) taught in English. American Studies Leipzig was awarded three international professorships: The Fulbright-Leipzig Chair for American Studies, the DAAD Professorship for American and International Studies, and the Picador Guest Professorship for Literature. It is also the home of Aspeers – Emerging voices in American Studies, a graduate-level peer-reviewed scholarly journal for American studies.

Erasmus Mundus Global Studies is an interdisciplinary, research-based Master offered by a consortium of five European universities: Leipzig University, the London School of Economics, University of Vienna, University of Wroclaw and Roskilde University. In the field of anthropology, the university is cooperating with the Leipzig Max Planck Institute for Evolutionary Anthropology. In 1995, the Leibniz-Institute for Jewish History and Culture named after Simon Dubnow was formed as a research institution related to the university. Since 2008 the university is also home to one of Germany's few Confucius Institutes. The institute is based on an agreement of June 2006 between the university administration and representatives of the Chinese Embassy to establish a Confucius Institute in cooperation with the Renmin University and the "National Office for Teaching Chinese as a Foreign Language". Leipzig University has been the home of the first German chair for Chinese and East Asian Languages in the 19th century, which later became the Institute of East Asian Studies, which still exists today (see Georg von der Gabelentz).

=== Rankings ===
University rankings

Overall – Global & National
QS World 2026	535	32
ARWU World 2023	201–300	10–19

Leipzig University is recognized in several university ranking systems. In the 2026 QS World University Rankings, the university was ranked 535th globally, placing it within the top 40 (32nd) nationally. The Academic Ranking of World Universities (ARWU), for 2023, positioned the university in the range of 201–300 on the global scale and somewhere between 10th and 19th within the country.

The university is ranked 18th in Germany, 98th in Europe, and 264th in the world by the web-based Webometrics Ranking of World Universities, a ranking evaluating universities' scientific online publications.

== Student life ==
Leipzig has a thriving student life with a large number of student run bars, sports clubs and recreational facilities for students. The student body in Leipzig is diverse, not only due to the broad spectrum of subjects at the university but also because of the other higher education institutions in the city. The Moritzbastei is the largest student club in Germany, it is part of the historic city fortifications of Leipzig and is famous for its atmosphere and large number of cultural events.The university is home to the Leipzig Academic Orchestra and the University Choir of Leipzig. There are numerous courses offered in performing arts every semester and a dance festival is organised by students once a year. In the field of sports, the university offers training opportunities and courses in almost all disciplines. During the annual Leipzig book fair, the university library and other university institutions organise public events for authors.

Leipzig university has a large body of international students. In winter term 2017, out of its 28,797 students about 11% (3,174) were foreign students.

== Notable people ==
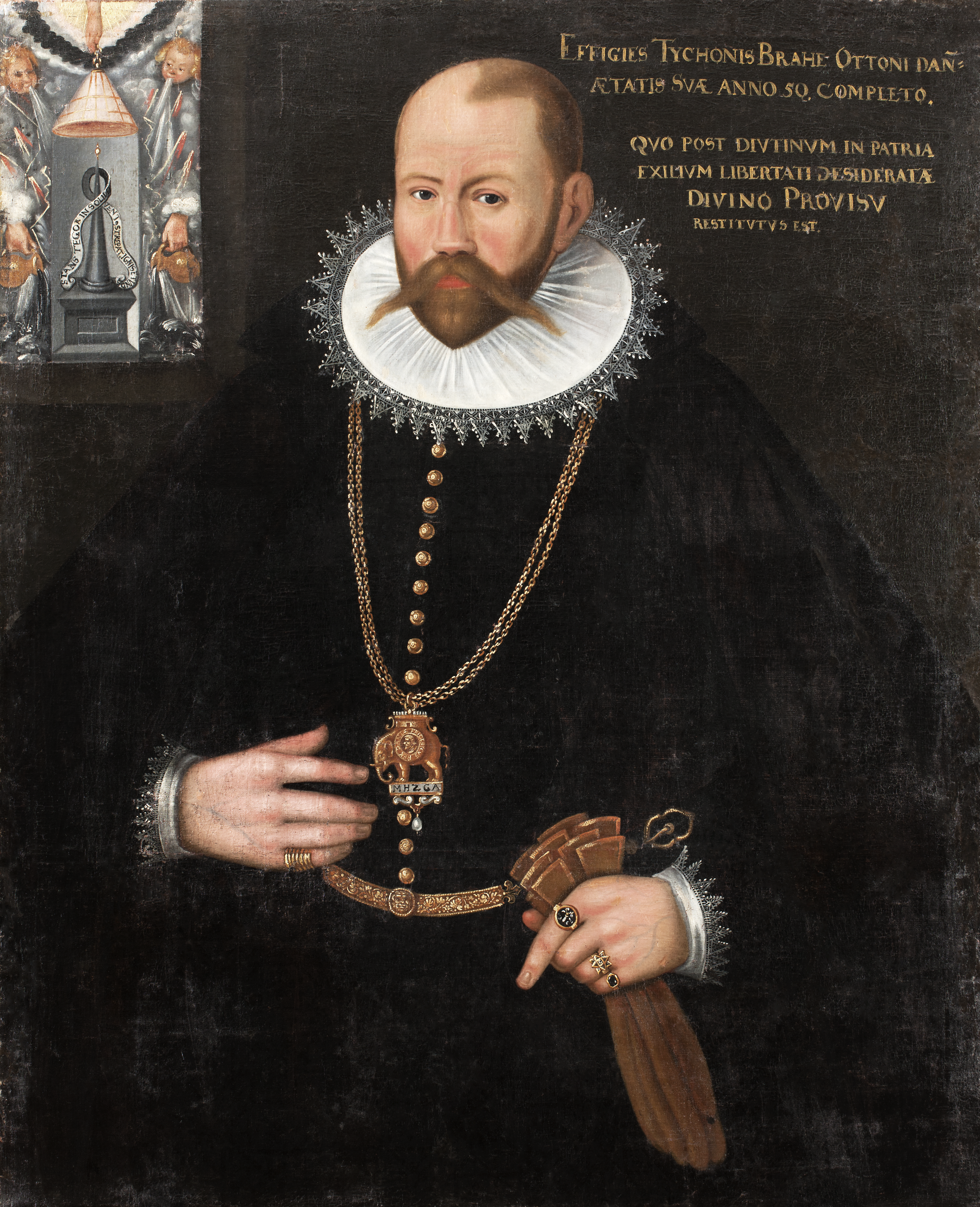
Tycho Brahe

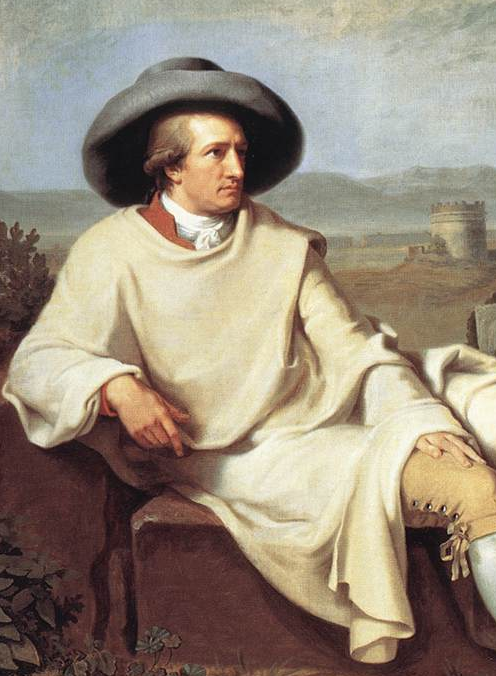
Johann Wolfgang von Goethe

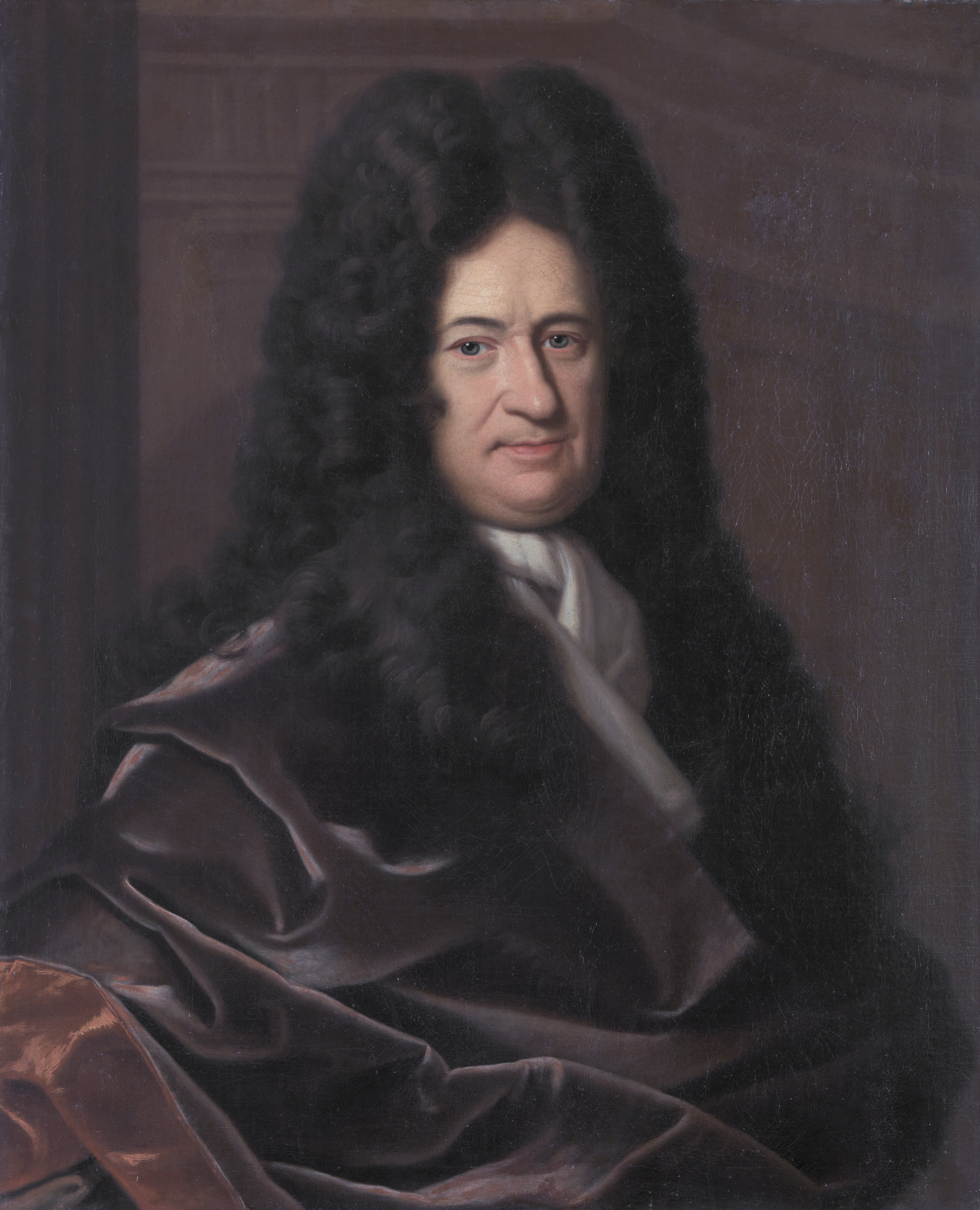
Gottfried Leibniz

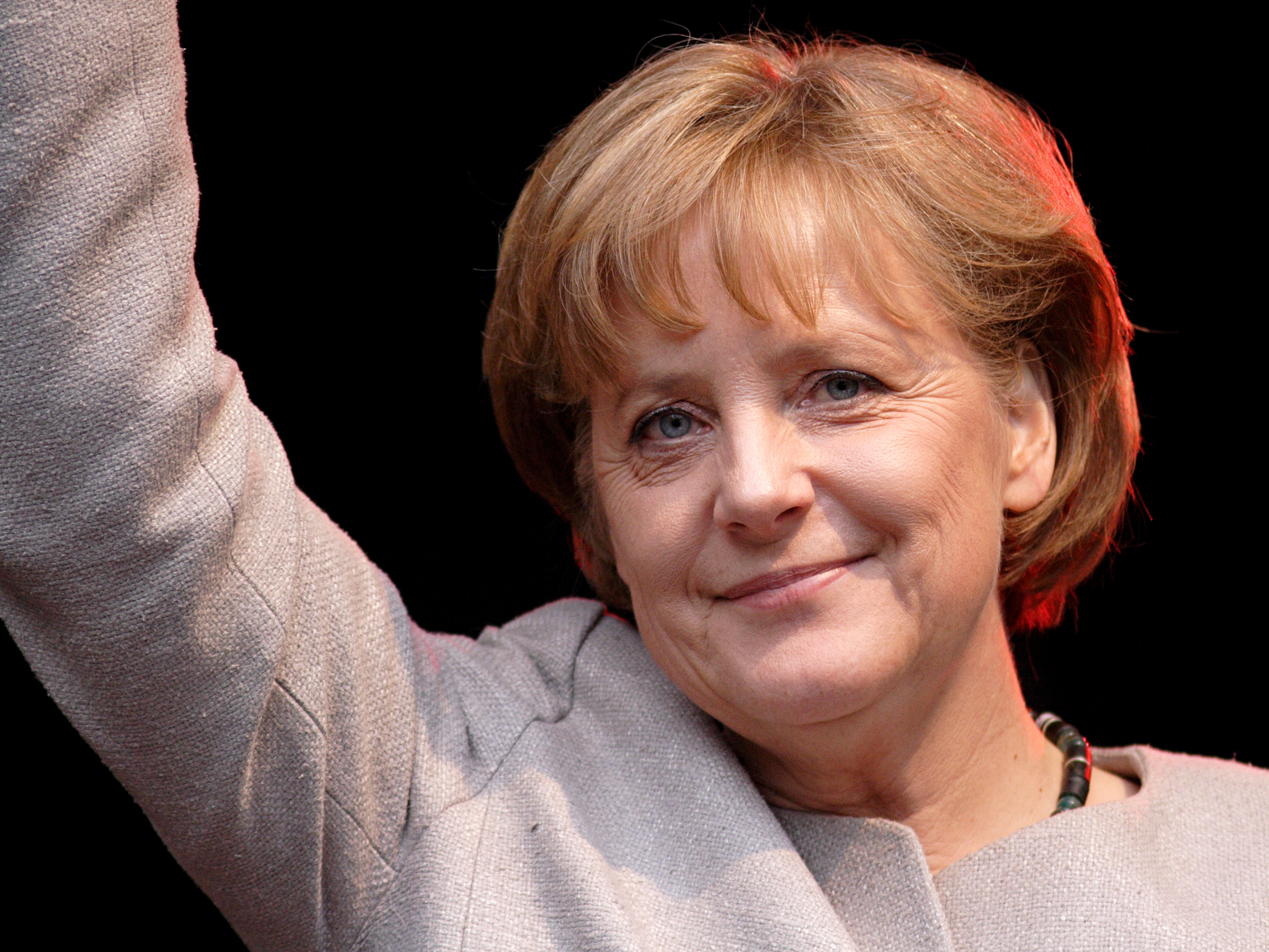
Angela Merkel

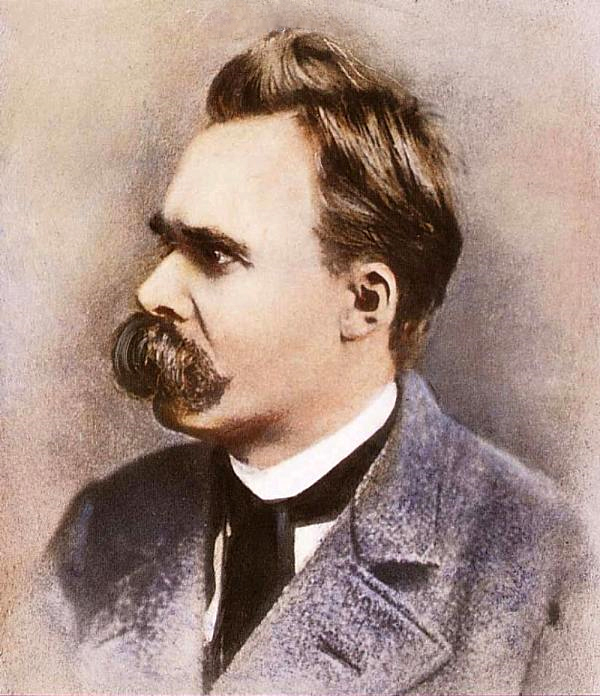
Friedrich Nietzsche

Leipzig University has produced many notable individuals and noble laureates. Some famous people affiliated with Leipzig include:

=== Music ===
- Robert Schumann, German music composer
- Georg Philipp Telemann, German composer
- Richard Wagner, German music composer
- Wilhelm Friedemann Bach, German composer, oldest famous son of Johann Sebastian Bach
- Carl Philipp Emanuel Bach, German composer, second famous son of Johann Sebastian Bach
- Johann Christoph Friedrich Bach, German composer, third famous son of Johann Sebastian Bach
- Johann Sebastian Bach, German composer, lived 27 years in Leipzig and wrote music for the city's churches and Leipzig University student ensemble
- Johann Christoph Altnickol, German composer, son-in-law to Johann Sebastian Bach
- Johann Friedrich Agricola, German composer, pupil of Johann Sebastian Bach
- Lorenz Christoph Mizler, German composer and music theorist, pupil of Johann Sebastian Bach
- Friedrich Blume, German music theorist
- Christoph Graupner, German composer
- Johann Kuhnau, German composer, Thomaskantor
- Johann David Heinichen, German composer and music theorist, Royal Polish and Electoral Saxon Kapellmeister

=== Theology ===
- Constantin von Tischendorf, German theologian and New Testament scholar
- Michael Ranft, German historian and theologian.
- Nathan Söderblom, Nobel Peace Prize, Swedish clergyman and professor of religious studies
- Franz Delitzsch, German theologian and Hebrew scholar.
- Paul Johannes Tillich, German theologian and philosopher.
- Hans-Georg Gadamer, German theologian, philosopher and rector of the university.
- Christian August Crusius, German theologian and philosopher.
- Adolf von Harnack, German theologian.
- Karl Friedrich Bahrdt, controversial German Protestant, biblical scholar, theologian, and polemicist.
- Christoph Ernst Luthardt German theologian.
- Martin Petzoldt German theologian.
- Martin Noth German theologian and Old Testament scholar.
- Ján Lajčiak, Lutheran pastor and Slovak orientalist.
- C. F. W. Walther, first President of the Lutheran Church–Missouri Synod and its most influential theologian.

=== Humanities ===
- Johann Wolfgang von Goethe, German poet and polymath.
- Theodor Mommsen, Nobel Prize in Literature, cofounder of Germany's first modern political party
- Friedrich Nietzsche, German philosopher
- Gotthold Ephraim Lessing, German philosopher and writer.
- Lin Yutang, China's pre-eminent scholar of the 20th century, nominated for a Nobel prize six times.
- Aurel Stein, Hungarian archeologist and Silk Road explorer
- Max Muller, philologist and Orientalist who wrote authoritative works on Indology.
- Leonard Bloomfield, American linguist who led the development of structural linguistics in the United States during the 1930s and the 1940s. He is considered to be the father of American Distributionalism.
- Johann Christoph Gottsched, German poet, author, and critic.
- Christian Friedrich Henrici, German poet, Saxon Actuary, Postal clerk, Postal Commissioner, and Wine inspector.
- Ferdinand de Saussure, linguist, founder of structuralism.
- Gert Jäger, Otto Kade and Albrecht Neubert, translation scholars and founders of the Leipzig School.

=== Sciences ===
- Regiomontanus, mathematician, astrologer and astronomer of the German Renaissance
- Svante Pääbo, 2022 Nobel Prize in Medicine, currently teaches molecular evolutionary biology at the university
- Paul Ehrlich, Nobel Prize in Medicine, Leipzig PhD
- Bernard Katz, Nobel Prize in Medicine for his work on nerve physiology, Leipzig graduate
- Haldan Keffer Hartline, Nobel Prize winner in Medicine, Leipzig student and Werner Heisenberg protege
- Wilhelm Ostwald, Nobel Prize in Chemistry, Leipzig faculty for 20 years, mentored multiple Nobel winners
- Svante Arrhenius, Nobel Prize in Chemistry, Leipzig faculty and Wilhelm Ostwald protege
- Friedrich Bergius, Nobel Prize in Chemistry, Leipzig PhD
- Carl Bosch, Nobel Prize in Chemistry, Leipzig PhD, founder of then world's largest chemical firm IG Farben
- Peter Debye, Nobel Prize in Chemistry, Leipzig faculty
- Robert S. Mulliken, Nobel Prize in Chemistry, Guggenheim Fellow at Leipzig to work with Werner Heisenberg
- Walther Nernst, Nobel Prize in Chemistry, Leipzig faculty and Wilhelm Ostwald protege
- Werner Heisenberg, Nobel Prize in Physics, Leipzig faculty for 15 years, mentored multiple Nobel winners
- Gustav Hertz, Nobel Prize in Physics, Leipzig faculty
- Felix Bloch, Nobel Prize in Physics, Leipzig PhD
- Lev Landau, Nobel Prize winner in Physics, Rockefeller Fellow at Leipzig to work with Werner Heisenberg
- Sin-Itiro Tomonaga, Nobel Prize in Physics, Leipzig student and Werner Heisenberg protege
- Friedrich Engel, German mathematician known for, amongst others, Engel expansion and Engel's theorem
- Tycho Brahe, Danish astronomer
- Gottfried Wilhelm von Leibniz, German philosopher, polymath, and mathematician who developed calculus
- Edward Teller, Hungarian-American nuclear scientist, member of the Manhattan Project and "father of the hydrogen bomb"
- Ernst Heinrich Weber, German physician and professor whose studies paved the way for the founding of the field of Psychology
- Wilhelm Wundt, German psychologist, founded the first formal laboratory for psychological research
- Gustav Theodor Fechner, German psychologist, founder of the field of Psychophysics
- Klaus Fuchs, German theoretical physicist
- Friedrich Hund, German physicist, discovered quantum tunnelling and is known for Hund's rules
- Felix Klein, German mathematician, known for his work in group theory, complex analysis and non-Euclidean geometry
- Sophus Lie, Norwegian mathematician who developed Lie algebra
- August Ferdinand Möbius, German mathematician and theoretical astronomer, known for the Möbius strip.
- Karl Mollweide, German mathematician and astronomer, known for the Mollweide projection
- Hermann Hankel, German mathematician, known for the Hankel transform
- Felix Hausdorff, German mathematician, one of the founders of modern topology, known for the Hausdorff space
- Maximilian von Frey, physiologist, inventor of the esthesiometer
- Hope Bridges Adams Lehmann, first female physician in Germany
- Arthur Amos Noyes, American chemist and President of the Massachusetts Institute of Technology
- Kikunae Ikeda, Japanese chemist, student of Wilhelm Ostwald, inventor of monosodium glutamate
- Bartel Leendert van der Waerden, Dutch mathematician
- Johann Samuel Traugott Gehler, German mathematician, physicist and lawyer, author of 'Physikalisches Wörterbuch'
- Edgar Odell Lovett, American mathematician
- Eberhard Zeidler, German mathematician and first managing director of Max Planck institute of mathematics in the sciences
- Otto von Guericke, German scientist, inventor, mathematician and physicist.
- George Cecil Jaffe, Russian chemist, theorist of columnar ionisation.
- Wei-Liang Chow, Chinese mathematician and stamp collector born in Shanghai, known for his work in algebraic geometry
- Johann Heinrich Winckler, German physicist
- Julius Edgar Lilienfeld, Austro-Hungarian physicist
- Ludwig Boltzmann, Austrian physicist
- William Vermillion Houston, American physicist
- Emil Kraepelin, German psychiatrist
- Felix Otto, German mathematician, currently teaches mathematical physics at the university
- Lykke Aresin, physician and sexologist
- Katja Werthmann, German ethnologist, regional focus West Africa, full professor at Leipzig University
- Friedrich Trendelenburg, German surgeon, described surgical removal of pulmonary emboli
- Dorothy Anna Hahn, American organic chemist, lifelong educator in organic chemistry at Mount Holyoke College

=== Politics ===
- Angela Merkel, Leipzig physicist, first female German Chancellor (2005–2021), the world's most powerful woman
- Gustav Stresemann, Leipzig economist, Nobel Peace Prize winner, Germany's Chancellor and Foreign Minister
- Bernhard von Bülow, Chancellor of the German Empire, Ambassador to Italy
- Theobald von Bethmann Hollweg, Chancellor of the German Empire, civil servant
- Georg Michaelis, Chancellor of the German Empire, lawyer
- Prince Maximilian of Baden, Chancellor of the German Empire, military general
- Abdel-Aziz bin Habtour, Prime Minister of Yemen (2016–2024)
- Michelle Bachelet, President of Chile (2006–2010, 2014–2018), UN High Commissioner for Human Rights (2018–2022)
- Raila Odinga, Prime Minister of Kenya (2008–2013), mechanical engineer
- Carlo Azeglio Ciampi, Prime Minister of Italy and President of Italy (1999–2006)
- Hendrik Verwoerd, Prime Minister of South Africa, psychologist
- Juan Negrín, Prime Minister of Spain, medical doctor
- Frederick North, Lord North, Prime Minister and Chancellor of Great Britain
- Juho Kusti Paasikivi, Prime Minister and President of Finland
- Edwin Linkomies, Prime Minister of Finland, professor of literature
- Edmund Schulthess, four-time President of Switzerland and Minister of Economic Affairs
- Robert Haab, two-time President of Switzerland and Ambassador to Germany
- Heinrich Häberlin, two-time President of Switzerland and Minister of Justice
- Eduard von Steiger, two-time President of Switzerland and Minister of Justice
- Johannes Baumann, President of Switzerland and Minister of Justice
- Albert Meyer, President of Switzerland and Minister of Finance
- Dimitrios Gounaris, two-time Prime Minister of Greece and Finance Minister
- Xenophon Zolotas, Prime Minister of Greece and Governor of the Central Bank
- Spyridon Lambros, Prime Minister of Greece
- Friedrich Ferdinand von Beust, President of Austria, Minister of Foreign Affairs, Ambassador to Britain and France
- Michael Hainisch, President of Austria
- Wenzel Anton, Prince of Kaunitz-Rietberg, Chancellor of Austria, Chief Minister, Minister of Foreign Affairs
- Francis Hagerup, two-times Prime Minister of Norway and Finance Minister
- Ljubomir Stojanović, Prime Minister of Serbia and first President of the Yugoslav Republican Party
- Mihailo V. Vujić, Prime Minister of Serbia, Finance Minister and Minister for Foreign Affairs
- Petru Groza, Prime Minister and President of Romania
- Nicolae Iorga, Prime Minister of Romania, Leipzig PhD
- Tomáš Masaryk, founding father and first President of Czechoslovakia
- Dezső Bánffy, Prime Minister of Hungary
- Bogdan Filov, Prime Minister of Bulgaria
- Kārlis Ulmanis, four-time Prime Minister of Latvia and President
- Ado Birk, Prime Minister of Estonia and two-times Minister of Foreign Affairs
- Noe Ramishvili, Georgia's Minister of Internal Affairs and Prime Minister
- Akaki Chkhenkeli, Georgia's Minister of Foreign Affairs and Prime Minister
- Edward Bernard Raczyński, President of Poland and Minister of Foreign Affairs
- Sarkis Kasyan, Premier of Armenia
- Rudolf Heinze, Premier of the Kingdom of Saxony and Vice Chancellor of the German Empire
- Hans von Thümmel, Premier and Finance Minister of the Kingdom of Saxony
- Johann Paul von Falkenstein, Premier of the Kingdom of Saxony
- Ferdinand von Zschinsky, Premier and Minister for Justice of the Kingdom of Saxony
- Carl Friedrich von Gerber, Premier of the Kingdom of Saxony and constitutional law professor
- Bernhard von Lindenau, Premier of the Kingdom of Saxony and Minister of the Interior
- Richard von Friesen, Premier of the Kingdom of Saxony, Finance Minister and Foreign Minister
- Konrad Wilhelm von Rüger, Premier of the Kingdom of Saxony
- Gustav Friedrich Held, Premier of the Kingdom of Saxony
- Friedrich Krafft Graf von Crailsheim, Premier and Foreign Minister of the Kingdom of Bavaria
- Baron Karl Ludwig von der Pfordten, Premier of the Kingdom of Bavaria, President of Leipzig University
- Karl August von Hardenberg, Prime Minister of the Kingdom of Prussia
- Carl Friedrich von Beyme, Grand Chancellor of the Kingdom of Prussia
- Lew Sapieha, Grand Chancellor and Grand Hetman of Lithuania
- Venelin Ganev, Regent of Bulgaria and Minister for Justice
- Augustus, Elector of Saxony, Regent of the Kingdoms of Denmark and Norway, and Elector of Saxony
- Constantine I of Greece, King of Greece
- Ferdinand I of Romania, King of Romania
- Frederick Augustus II of Saxony, King of Saxony
- John, King of Saxony, King of Saxony
- George, King of Saxony, King of Saxony
- Frederick Augustus III of Saxony, King of Saxony
- John George I, Elector of Saxony, Elector of Saxony
- John George II, Elector of Saxony, Elector of Saxony
- Frederick Christian, Elector of Saxony, Elector of Saxony
- Louis II, Grand Duke of Hesse, Grand Duke, father of the Empress of Russia Maria Alexandrovna (Marie of Hesse)
- Friedrich Wilhelm, Duke of Schleswig-Holstein-Sonderburg-Glücksburg, Grand Duke, father of the King of Denmark Christian IX, grandfather of the Queen of the United Kingdom Alexandra of Denmark
- Peter I, Grand Duke of Oldenburg, Grand Duke of Oldenburg
- Johann Wolfgang von Goethe, writer, Chancellor and Premier, Saxe-Weimar
- Janusz Radziwiłł (1612–1655), Grand Hetman and de-facto ruler of Lithuania
- Konoe Atsumaro, Prince of Japan, President of the House of Peers, father of Prime Minister Fumimaro Konoe
- Józef Aleksander Jabłonowski, Prince of the Polish-Lithuanian Commonwealth, founder of Leipzig's Jabłonowski Academy of Sciences
- Cai Yuanpei, China's Minister for Education, president of Peking University, founder of Academia Sinica
- Hans-Dietrich Genscher, Vice Chancellor and Foreign Minister of Germany (1974–1992)
- Eugen Schiffer, Vice Chancellor and Finance Minister of Germany
- John Anderson, 1st Viscount Waverley, Chancellor and Home Secretary of Great Britain, Governor of Bengal
- John Charles Herries, Chancellor of Great Britain
- Kurt Schumacher, Leader of the Social Democratic Party and anti-Nazi resistance fighter
- Fridolin Anderwert, Vice-President of Switzerland and Minister of Justice
- Saleh Shafeeq Irsheadat, Deputy Prime Minister of Jordan and Minister of Transport
- Dendev Terbishdagva, Deputy Prime Minister of Mongolia (2012–2014) and Acting Prime Minister
- Peter-Michael Diestel, Deputy Prime Minister and Interior Minister of the German Democratic Republic
- Alexander Kurakin, Vice Chancellor of Russia
- Juozas Matulis, Deputy Premier of Lithuania
- Kim Hwan, Deputy Prime Minister, Special Envoy, Democratic People's Republic of Korea
- Ku Meng-yu, Vice Premier of the Republic of China and Minister of Education
- Katrin Göring-Eckardt, Vice President of Germany's Federal Parliament (2005–2013, 2021–2025)
- Choe Thae-bok, Chairman of the Supreme People's Assembly of North Korea (1998–2019), Member of the Politburo
- Luo Gan, Chinese Politician, Member of the Politburo Standing Committee from 2002–2007
- Yosef Burg, one of Israel's longest serving cabinet ministers (1951–1986)
- Jeff Radebe, South Africa's longest serving cabinet minister (1994–2019)
- Zola Skweyiya, South Africa's Minister of Public Service and Social Development (1994–2009)
- Tosuke Hirata, Japanese aristocrat, Minister for Home Affairs and Minister for Agriculture and Commerce
- Yamamoto Teijiro, Japanese businessman, served twice as Japan's Minister for Agriculture and Forestry
- Eugen von Böhm-Bawerk, Austrian economist, three-time Finance Minister of Austria
- Joseph Redlich, Finance Minister of Austria
- Hjalmar Schacht, German economist, President of the German central bank and Minister of Economics
- Gustav Radbruch, German lawyer, Germany's Minister of Justice
- Johanna Wanka, Germany's Minister for Education (2013–2018)
- Christine Bergmann, Germany's Minister for Family Affairs
- Andreas Peter Bernstorff, Denmark's Minister for Foreign Affairs
- Dimitrije Matić, Serbia's Minister for Foreign Affairs and President of the National Assembly
- Igor Shchyogolev, Russia's Minister for Telecommunications (2008–2012) and Advisor to the Russian President (2012–2018)
- Ernesto Ferreira França, Brazil's Minister for Foreign Affairs
- Roberto Ampuero, Chile's Minister for Foreign Affairs
- Elias Blix, Norway's Minister for Education
- Josef Kaizl, Minister for Finance for Austria-Hungary
- Lajos Walko, Hungary's Minister for Finance and Minister for Foreign Affairs
- András Bethlen, Hungary's Minister for Agriculture
- Tihamér Fabinyi, Hungary's Minister for Finance
- Georgios Kartalis, Labour Minister of Greece
- Virgil Madgearu, Romania's Minister for Finance and Minister for Trade and Industry
- Dimitrie Gusti, Romania's Minister for Education
- Ion Nistor, Romania's Minister for Labour
- Gheorghe Cipăianu, Romania's Minister for Agriculture
- Darem Tabbaa, Syria's Minister for Education (2020–2023)
- Mohammad Abdulrahman Tarkou, Syria's Minister for Education (since 2025)
- Tamer Al Hajeh, Syria's Minister for Environment
- Ivan Shishmanov, Bulgaria's Minister for Education
- Čedomilj Mijatović, Serbia's Minister for Finance and Minister for Foreign Affairs
- Dositej Obradović, Serbia's first Minister for Education
- Mei Zhaorong, China Ambassador to Germany and Vice Minister of China (1992–1997)
- William Dodd, US Ambassador to Germany, aide and speechwriter to American President Woodrow Wilson
- Joseph I. France, American politician and US Senator
- Nathan Matthews Jr., American politician and Mayor of Boston
- William Milligan Sloane, American professor at Princeton and Columbia, founder of the US Olympic Committee, Leipzig PhD
- Karl Liebknecht, German lawyer, politician, cofounder of the far left wing of the Social Democratic Party of Germany
- Lothar Kreyssig, German lawyer and judge who attempted to stop Nazi mass murder in the Second World War
- Erwin Bumke, president of Germany's Supreme Court
- Virgile Rossel, president of Switzerland's Supreme Court and president of the Swiss National Council
- George Pardee, Governor of California and medical doctor
- William T. Cobb, Governor of Maine
- Ralph Abercromby, Governor of Trinidad and British Member of Parliament
- Sir George Yonge, 5th Baronet, Governor of the Cape Colony and British Member of Parliament
- James Phelan Jr., US Congressman
- Thomas Morris (New York politician), US Congressman and US Marshall
- Oscar Tascheret, Argentina's Ambassador to India and medical doctor
- Samuel Morley Wickett, Canadian politician, Toronto council member, pioneer in urban planning, Leipzig PhD
- Bastian Seidel, Australian politician and medical doctor, member of Tasmania's Legislative Council
- Johann Major, German Lutheran theologian, a principal author of the Leipzig Interim, author of the Majoristic Controversy
- Rudolph Sohm, lawyer and Church historian
- Selig Brodetsky, Israeli President of the Hebrew University of Jerusalem
- Mori Ōgai, writer and medical doctor, director of the Imperial Museum, Surgeon General of Japan
- Levon Shant, Vice-President of the Parliament of Armenia
- Ernst Jünger, author involved in the Conservative Revolution of the 1920s

=== Sports ===
- Birgit Fischer, German Olympic kayaker, the most decorated Germany Olympian of all time with eight gold medals and five silver medals (1980–2004)
- Kristin Otto, Leipzig University journalism graduate and German Olympic swimmer, first woman to win six gold medals in a single Olympics games (1988)
- Claudia Nystad, German Olympic skier, winner of six Olympic medals including two gold medals (2002–2014)
- Tina Dietze, German Olympic rower, winner of four Olympic medals including a gold medal (2012–2016)
- Annekatrin Thiele, German Olympic rower and winner of three Olympic medals including a gold medal (2008–2016)
- Jürgen Gröbler, German rower and Olympic rowing coach, known for coaching ten different Olympic gold medal winning teams (1972–2016)
- Anett Schuck, German Olympic rower and winner of two Olympic gold medals (1996–2000)
- Kristina Mundt, German Olympic rower and winner of two Olympic gold medals (1988–1992)
- Luz Long, German Olympic long-jumper and silver medalist, noted for his sportsmanship and his friendship with Jesse Owens
- Uwe Ampler, German Olympic cyclist and gold medalist
- Angelika Bahmann, German Olympic rower and gold medalist
- Anna-Maria Müller, German Olympic luger and gold medalist
- Jan Schur, German Olympic cyclist and gold medalist
- Sven Tippelt, German Olympic gymnast and three-time Olympic medalist

== See also ==
- Handelshochschule Leipzig (HHL)
- Leipzig school (sociology)
- List of medieval universities
- List of universities in Germany

== Literature ==
- Merskin, Debra L. (2020). The Sage international encyclopedia of mass media and society. Thousand Oaks, California. ISBN 978-1-4833-7551-9. OCLC 1130315057.
- Scholars and Literati at the University of Leipzig (1409–1800), in Repertorium Eruditorum Totius Europae/RETE.
