= Belt, North Holland =

Human residence in the Netherlands

Coordinates: 52°54′18″N 4°57′5″E

Belt or De Belt is a hamlet in the Dutch province of North Holland. It is located on the former island of Wieringen.

Belt is located just to the west of the village of Hippolytushoef. It is named after the small hill ("bult") that it lies on. It is not named on recent topographical maps, where it is considered to be a part of Hippolytushoef.
