= Wieringen =

- Former municipality
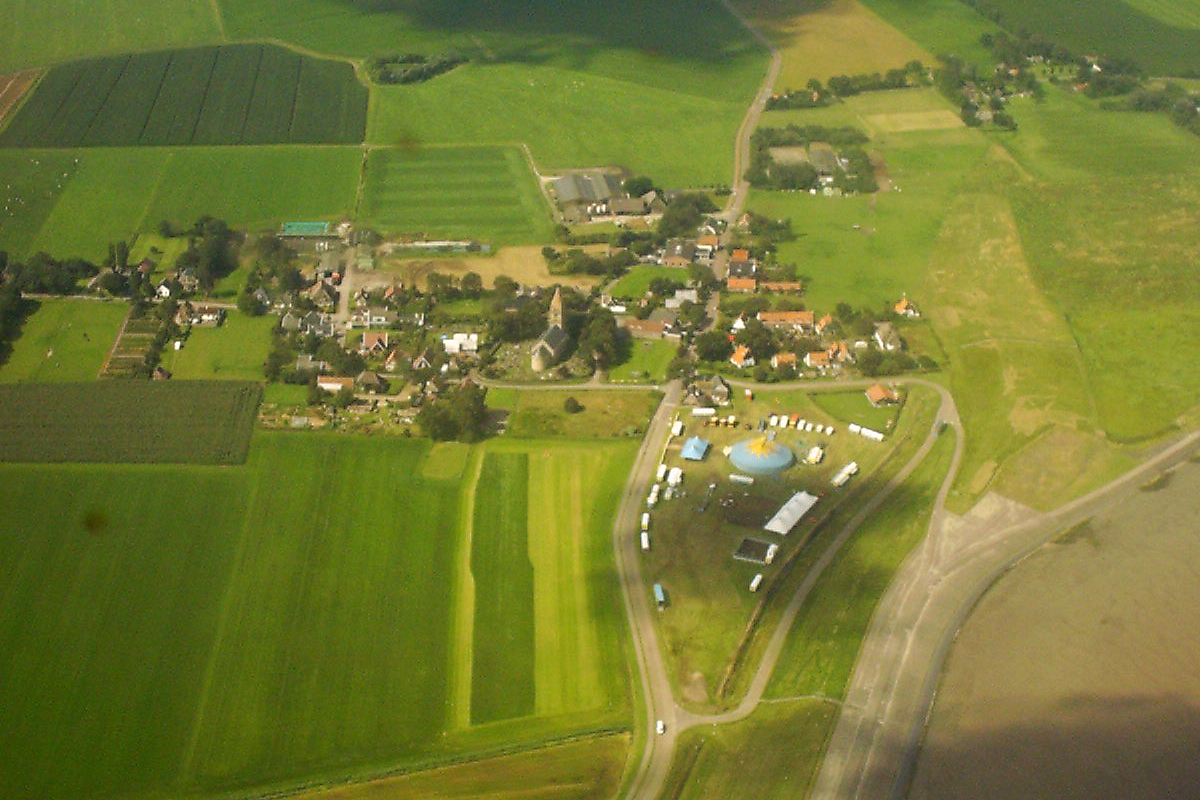
- Aerial photograph of Oosterland

- Flag Coat of arms

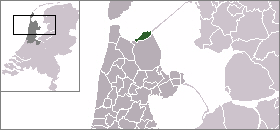
- Coordinates: 52.90°N 4.97°E
- Country: Netherlands
- Province: North Holland
- Municipality: Hollands Kroon

Area (2006)
  - Total: 212.50 km^{2} (82.05 sq mi)
  - Land: 26.77 km^{2} (10.34 sq mi)
  - Water: 185.73 km^{2} (71.71 sq mi)

Population (1 January 2007)
  - Total: 8,705
  - Density: 325/km^{2} (840/sq mi)
- Source: CBS, Statline.
- Time zone: UTC+1 (CET)
  - Summer (DST): UTC+2 (CEST)
- Website: www.wieringen.nl

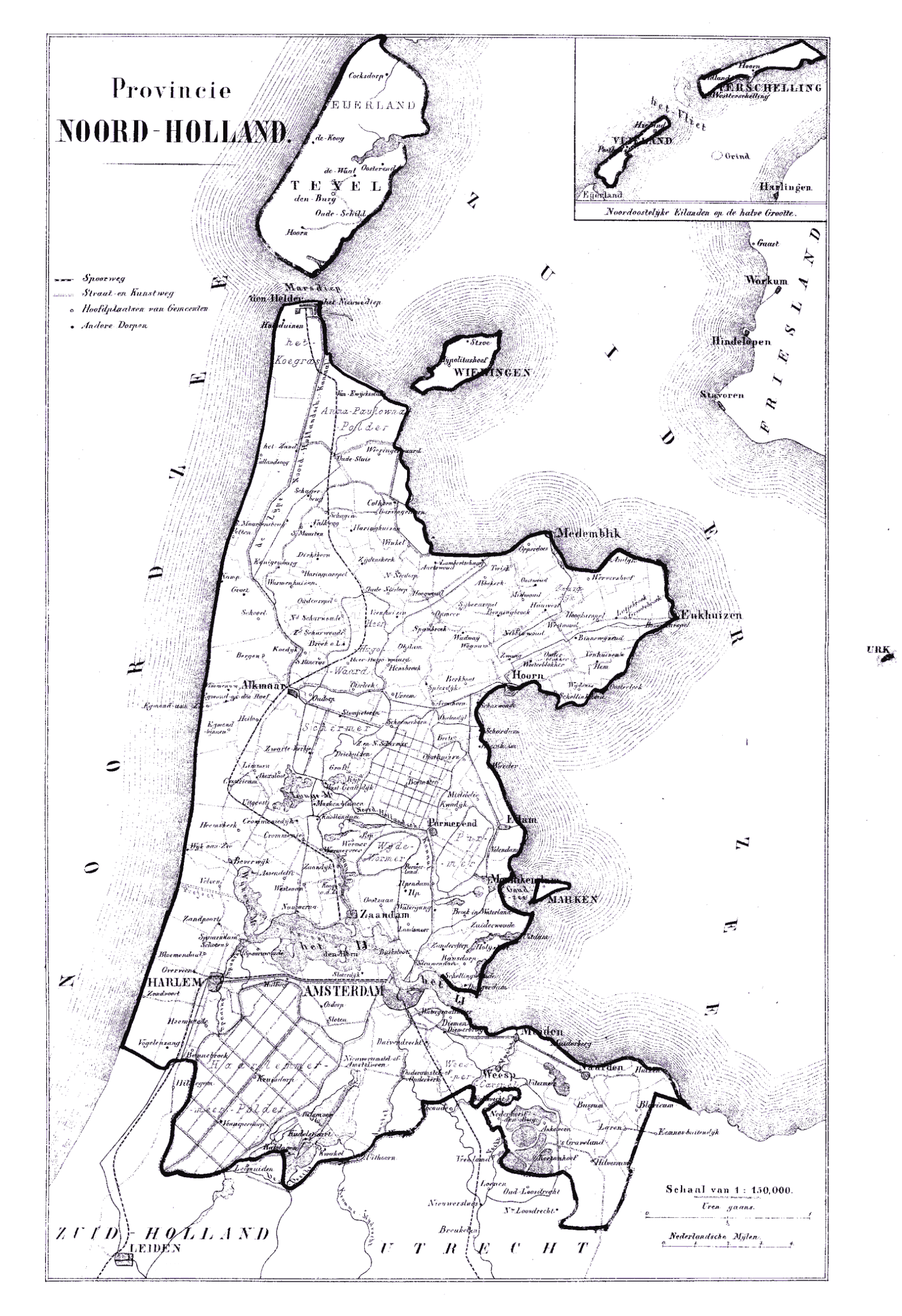
Map of North Holland from 1865 with Wieringen still an island

Wieringen (Dutch pronunciation: [ˈʋiːrɪŋə(n)]) is located in the province of North Holland in the Netherlands. Now a part of the municipality of Hollands Kroon, it was a separate municipality before 2012. Its name first appeared in 8th and 9th century records. By 1200 it was an island, also named Wieringen, separated from the mainland during one of the severe storm floods in the late Middle Ages that changed the coastline. Through the usage of draining, dikes, and landfill from 1924 to 1932, the island was rejoined to the mainland.

In 2003 the provincial and local governments announced a project to restore Wieringen as an island by creating a recreational lake to be called the Wieringerrandmeer. The project was cancelled in 2010 for financial reasons.

== Population centres ==
The former municipality of Wieringen consisted of the following villages and hamlets: Dam, De Elft, De Haukes, De Hoelm, Den Oever, Hippolytushoef, Hollebalg, Noordburen, Oosterklief, Oosterland, Smerp, Stroe, Vatrop, Westerklief and Westerland.

== History ==
The landscape of Wieringen is not all flat: it is characterised by boulder clay mounds, formed during the Saale Ice Age. The name Wieringen probably comes from Old Frisian wîr meaning "height". It was previously suggested incorrectly that the name came from "wier" (seaweed in Dutch).

=== Early references ===
The first known written references to Wieringen are "Wiron" or "pagus Wirense" in Latin lists of property owned by the monastery at Fulda, dated late 8th century or early 9th century AD. In this list, the Marsdiep (the channel between Wieringen and Texel and the mainland) is referred to as "fluvium Maresdeop" (fluvium is Latin for "river" and Maresdeop is old Dutch for "morass deep"), and Wieringen and Texel may have met as opposite banks of this deep river. It appears that at that time Texel and Wieringen islands were much larger and spread across what is now the western end of the Waddenzee and perhaps also other areas which are now sea or in polders.

A possessions list of the St. Martin's church in Utrecht, dated 948, lists a church domain with 12 farms at Alvitlo (now De Elft), and 72 [probably mostly small] farms at Strude (now Stroe). Both these places are in Wieringen. The land in these lists comprises an area larger than the modern (up to 1924) island of Wieringen.

=== Later history ===
Viking attacks and occupation of Frisian territory took place in the 9th century. This was confirmed in 1996 when a hoard containing 1.7 kilograms of silver coins, ingots and jewelry was found in a pasture at the hamlet of Westerklief. It was dated to the 9th century and is attributed to Vikings. It is now in the Rijksmuseum van Oudheden in Leiden. Smaller hoards from the same period were later found in the same area.

The All Saints' Flood (1170) created the islands of Wieringen and Texel from North Holland. The area was inhabited and controlled by Frisians, until the Dutch count Floris III made the Wieringers subject in 1184. After this the area became unsettled, with Floris V imposing his rule in 1284, and in 1299 it was included in the district of Westfriesland within the County of Holland.

In 1432 all the island of Wieringen was officially designated as one township and received city rights. But as more of Holland and Westfriesland became habitable and were developed, the importance of Wieringen decreased.

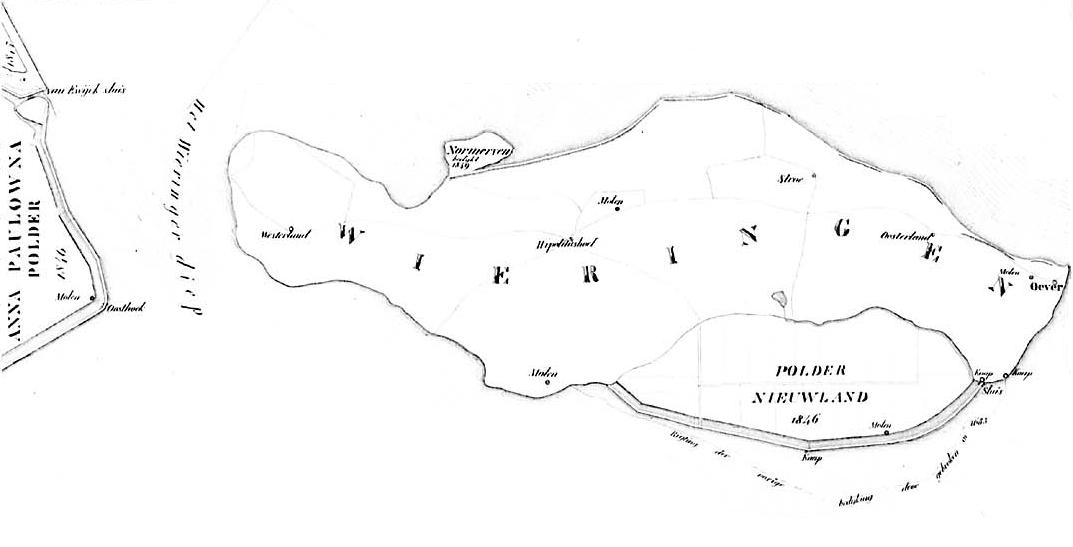
An 1849 map of the island of Wieringen

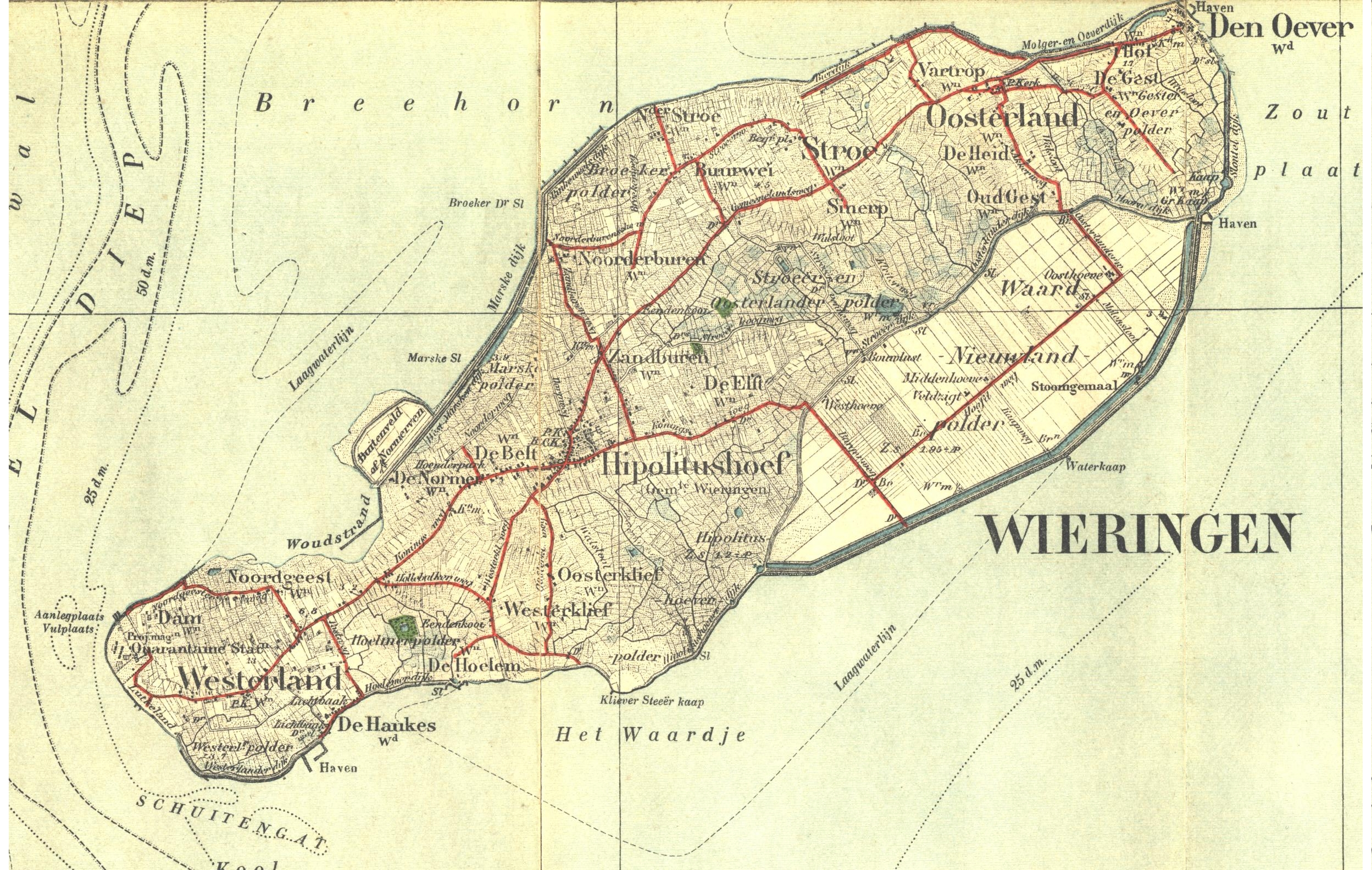
A 1909 map of the island of Wieringen

In 1798 when the Batavian Republic formed, the province of Holland and West Friesland was divided, and Wieringen fell under the département of Texel (from the Vlie to the Rhine). In 1807 under Napoleon, the province was subdivided into two separate provinces; Amstelland and Maasland, but this organization ended in 1814. In 1815 Wieringen became a part of the province of Holland, and the new province of North Holland in 1840, where it remains.

In November 1918 the German crown prince Wilhelm received political asylum in the Netherlands. He lived in Wieringen from November 1918, returning to Germany in November 1923.

On 31 July 1924 the Amsteldiep was closed by a short dam called the Amsteldiepdijk. In 1930 the Eastern Wieringermeerdijk was completed in the Zuiderzee, and with it the adjacent polder the Wieringermeer. The closing of the Zuiderzee was completed in 1932 by the Afsluitdijk, a large dike that connects Wieringen with Friesland, making it part of the mainland again. This dike starts at Den Oever.

== Local government ==
The former municipal council of Wieringen consisted of 13 seats, which at the final election in 2010 divided as follows:

- VVD – 5 seats
- Wieringen 05 – 4 seats
- PvdA – 3 seats
- CDA – 1 seat

Elections were held in November 2011 for a council for the newly merged municipality of Hollands Kroon that included Wieringen, which commenced work in January 2012.
