= Gert Jäger =

Gert Jäger (Dresden, 13 May 1935) is a German translation scholar and a specialist in the Polish and Czech languages.

After obtaining his Abitur in 1952, Jäger studied Czech studies, Polish studies, Russian studies, Serbo-Croatian and Lithuanian at Leipzig University, obtaining his degree in 1956. While holding several posts at the University, he obtained his PhD in 1963 and another doctorate in 1973.

Together with Otto Kade and Albrecht Neubert he has been a notable member of the Leipzig School.

== Selected works ==
- Elemente einer Theorie der bilingualen Translation. In: Grundfragen der Übersetzungswissenschaft, Leipzig 1968
- Zur Klassifizierung komplexer Sätze im Tschechischen und Polnischen. Halle, Niemeyer, 1968.
- Translation und Translationslinguistik. Halle, Niemeyer 1975
- Kommunikative und funktionelle Äquivalenz (with D. Müller). In: Linguistische Arbeitsberichte, Leipzig 1973
- Translation und Adaptation. In: Linguistische Arbeitsberichte, Leipzig 1980
- Die sprachliche Bedeutung – das zentrale Problem bei der Translation und ihrer wissenschaftlichen Beschreibung. In: Übersetzungswissenschaftliche Beiträge, Leipzig 1980
