= Otto Adolf Wenzel Kade =

Otto Adolf Wenzel Kade (28 March 1927, Frýdlant, Sudetenland – 2 November 1980, Eichwalde) was a German specialist in Russian language and translation scholar.

During the postwar years he started out as a self-taught interpreter of Russian and teacher of Czech and Russian. Afterwards he has appointed at several posts at the translation institute of Karl Marx University, Leipzig. His doctoral dissertation Subjektive und objektive Faktoren im Übersetzungsprozeß (Subjective and objective factors in the translation process) was probably the first translation studies dissertation in Germany; it appeared as a supplement to the journal Fremdsprachen under the title "Zufall und Gesetzmäßigkeit in der Übersetzung" (Chance and regularity in translation). In this work, Kade sought to go beyond the limits of a purely linguistic approach to interpretation and translation. It is considered one of the most significant achievements of translation theory in Germany.

Together with Gert Jäger and Albrecht Neubert, Kade was a notable member of the Leipzig School.

== Selected works ==
- Kommunikationswissenschaftliche Probleme der Translation, Leipzig 1968.
- Zufall oder Gesetzmäßigkeit in der Übersetzung, Leipzig 1968.
- Studien zur Übersetzungswissenschaft, Leipzig 1971.
- (editor), Sprachliches und Aussersprachliches in der Kommunikation, Leipzig 1979.
- Die Sprachmittlung als gesellschaftliche Erscheinung und Gegenstand wissenschaftlicher Untersuchung, Leipzig 1980.
