= Katja Werthmann =

German professor

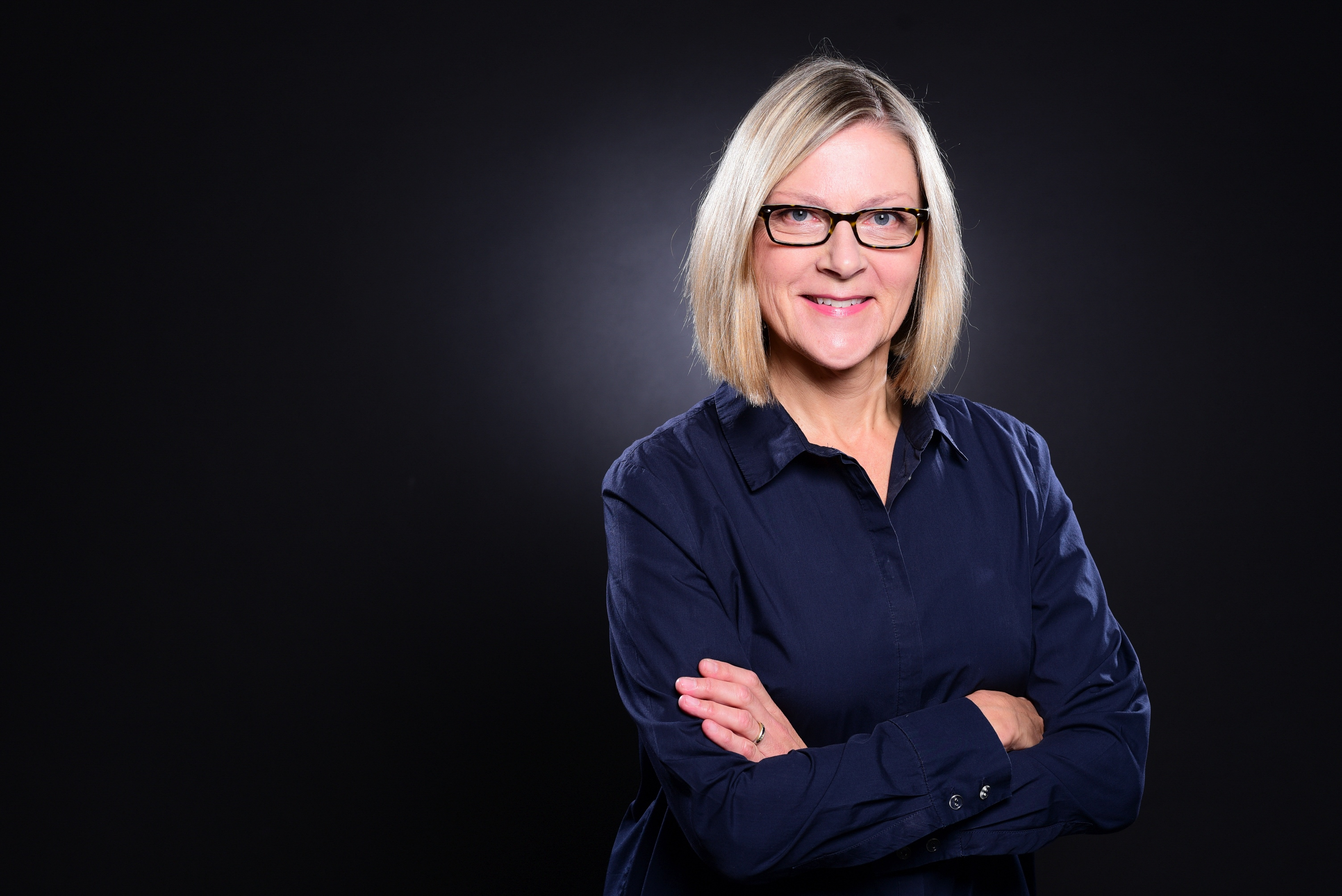
- Prof. Dr. Katja Werthmann, 2019
- Born: May 11, 1964 (age 62); Freiburg im Breisgau, West Germany
- Occupation: University professor
- Title: Prof. Dr.

Academic background
- Education: Free University of Berlin; University of Mainz; Goethe University Frankfurt

Academic work
- Discipline: Anthropology; Ethnology; Social anthropology
- Institutions: University of Leipzig

Katja Werthmann (born 1964 in Freiburg im Breisgau, Germany) is a German social and cultural anthropologist whose regional research focus is West Africa. She is Professor of Society, Politics and Economy of Africa at Leipzig University.

== Academic career ==
Werthmann studied European Cultural Anthropology, Historical Anthropology, and African Linguistics at Goethe University Frankfurt, graduating with a Magister Artium (M.A.) in 1990. In 1996, she received her doctorate from the Free University of Berlin with a dissertation on the everyday lives of Muslim women in the Nigerian city of Kano. She completed her habilitation at Johannes Gutenberg University Mainz in 2004 with a study of artisanal gold mining in Burkina Faso. Following academic appointments at the universities of Frankfurt (Main), Mainz, Halle-Wittenberg, Zurich and Uppsala, she was appointed Professor of Society, Politics and Economy of Africa at Leipzig University in 2012. From 2000 to 2007, Werthmann served as Coordinator of the Africa Working Group within the German Association for Social and Cultural Anthropology (DGSKA). She was a member of the editorial board of Africa Spectrum from 2004 to 2015 and of Sociologus from 2015 to 2026. Between 2015 and 2024, she also served on the editorial board of the African Social Studies book series published by Brill. Between 2004 and 2024, Werthmann served on several occasions as a member of the Executive Board and Steering Committee of the Association for African Studies in Germany (VAD).

== Research ==
Werthmann’s research focuses on urban life, gender, Islam, mining and local political organisation. She has conducted field research in Burkina Faso, Ghana, Cameroon and Nigeria. Within interdisciplinary research projects, she led sub-projects on industrial gold mining, urban mobility and vigilante groups. In 2022, she published City Life in Africa: Anthropological Insights, which provides a comprehensive overview of social anthropological research on urban Africa from the 1930s to the early 2000s.

== Selected publications ==
- 2024 (with Houd Kanazoé) Moving Despite Constraints: Socio-Spatial Navigation in a West African City. Urbanities 14, 2, 2-18.
- 2022 City Life in Africa. Anthropological Insights. New York, NY: Routledge
- 2017 The Drawbacks of Privatization: Artisanal Gold Mining in Burkina Faso 1986-2016. Resources Policy 52, 418-426. 10.1016/j.resourpol.2017.04.007
- 2013 (ed. with Mamadou Lamine Sanogo): La ville de Bobo-Dioulasso au Burkina Faso. Urbanité et appartenances en Afrique de l’ouest. Paris: Karthala.
- 2012 Transformations d’une élite musulmane en Afrique de l’Ouest: le cas des Jula au Darsalamy (Burkina Faso). Cahiers d’Études africaines, LII (4), 208, 845-876. 10.4000/etudesafricaines.17178
- 2010 Following the Hills: Gold Mining Camps as Heterotopias. In: Ulrike Freitag & Achim von Oppen (eds.), Translocality. The Study of Globalising Processes from a Southern Perspective. Leiden: Brill, 111-132.
- 2009 Bitteres Gold. Bergbau, Land und Geld in Westafrika. Köln: Köppe
- 2008 (ed. with Gerald Schmitt) Staatliche Herrschaft und kommunale Selbstverwaltung. Dezentralisierung in Kamerun. Frankfurt: Brandes & Apsel.
- 2003 The President of the Gold Diggers: Sources of Power in a Gold Mine in Burkina Faso. Ethnos 68, 1, 95-111. 10.1080/0014184032000060380
- 2002 „Matan Bariki“, Women of the Barracks. Muslim Hausa Women in an Urban Neighbourhood in Northern Nigeria. Africa 72, 1, 112-130. 10.3366/afr.2002.72.1.112
- 1997 Nachbarinnen. Das Alltagsleben muslimischer Frauen in einer nigerianischen Großstadt. Frankfurt/Main: Brandes & Apsel.
