= Noordburen =

- Hamlet
- Location in the Netherlands Location in the province of North Holland in the Netherlands
- Coordinates: 52.9190°N 4.9601°E
- Country: Netherlands
- Province: North Holland
- Municipality: Haarlemmermeer
- Time zone: UTC+1 (CET)
  - Summer (DST): UTC+2 (CEST)
- Postal code: 1777
- Dialing code: 0227

Noordburen is a hamlet in the Dutch province of North Holland. It is a part of the municipality of Hollands Kroon. Noordburen lies about 14 km southeast of Den Helder, and one km north of Hippolytushoef.

Noordburen is not a statistical entity, and the postal authorities have placed it under Hippolytushoef. Noordburen has place name signs, and consists of a handful of houses.
