= Stroe, North Holland =

Stroe
- Hamlet
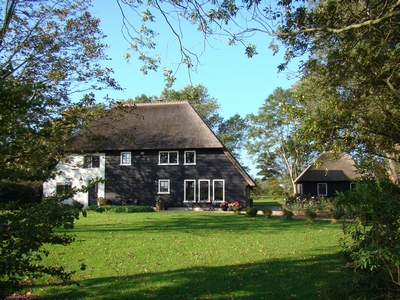

- Location in the Netherlands Location in the province of North Holland in the Netherlands
- Coordinates: 52°56′N 4°59′E
- Country: Netherlands
- Province: North Holland
- Municipality: Hollands Kroon

Area
  - Total: 0.25 km^{2} (0.097 sq mi)

Population (2025)
  - Total: 110
  - Density: 440/km^{2} (1,100/sq mi)
- Time zone: UTC+1 (CET)
  - Summer (DST): UTC+2 (CEST)
- Postal code: 1777
- Dialing code: 0227

Stroe is a hamlet in the Dutch province of North Holland. It is a part of the municipality of Hollands Kroon, and lies about 14 kilometres (8.7 mi) southeast of Den Helder.

Stroe is considered part of Hippolytushoef. It has place name signs. Stroe was home to 175 people in 1840. It used to have a church, but it was demolished in the late-19th century. There were also a clandestine Mennonite church in farm, but it burnt down in 1934.
