= Alexander Shveitser =

Alexander Davydovich Shveitser (1923–2002) was a Russian linguist specializing in American English. A professor and doctor of philology, Shveitser was a translator and interpreter from English and German, one of the founders of the Russian theory of translation, and of the Soviet schools of simultaneous interpretation. He was a pioneering scholar in the nascent field of sociolinguistics.

== Early life ==
Born into a middle-class Jewish family in Moscow, he studied at the Military Institute of Foreign Languages when World War II broke out. He joined the military at the age of 19 and served with distinction receiving numerous military decorations. After the war was over he participated in the 1946 Tokyo War Crimes Tribunal.

== Career ==
Shveitser belonged to the elite circle of top simultaneous interpreters working in international organizations such as the United Nations and the World Health Organization and he trained numerous top interpreters himself. He taught at the Military Institute of Foreign Languages, and then for many years at the Moscow State Pedagogical Institute of Foreign Languages (now Moscow State Linguistic University), where he headed the Department of Interpretation. In later years, he also worked as a principal researcher at the Institute of Linguistics, Russian Academy of Sciences. He is the author of the landmark monographs "Standard English in the USA and England" (1971), "Translation and Linguistics" (1973), "Modern Sociolinguistics. Theory, Problems, Methods" (1977) and about 150 other books and articles many of which were translated into foreign languages. In 1999 he became a Fulbright scholar and taught at several US Universities. Although little known in English-speaking countries, he was recognised as one of Russia's most significant translation scholars.

He was an active participant in the Pugwash Movement and Dartmouth Conferences which brought together international scholars and public figures to build confidence and reduce the danger of armed conflict.
