= Steel belt =

Type of conveyor belt

A steel belt is a type of conveyor belt used in many industries such as food, chemical, wood processing, and transportation.

== Overview ==
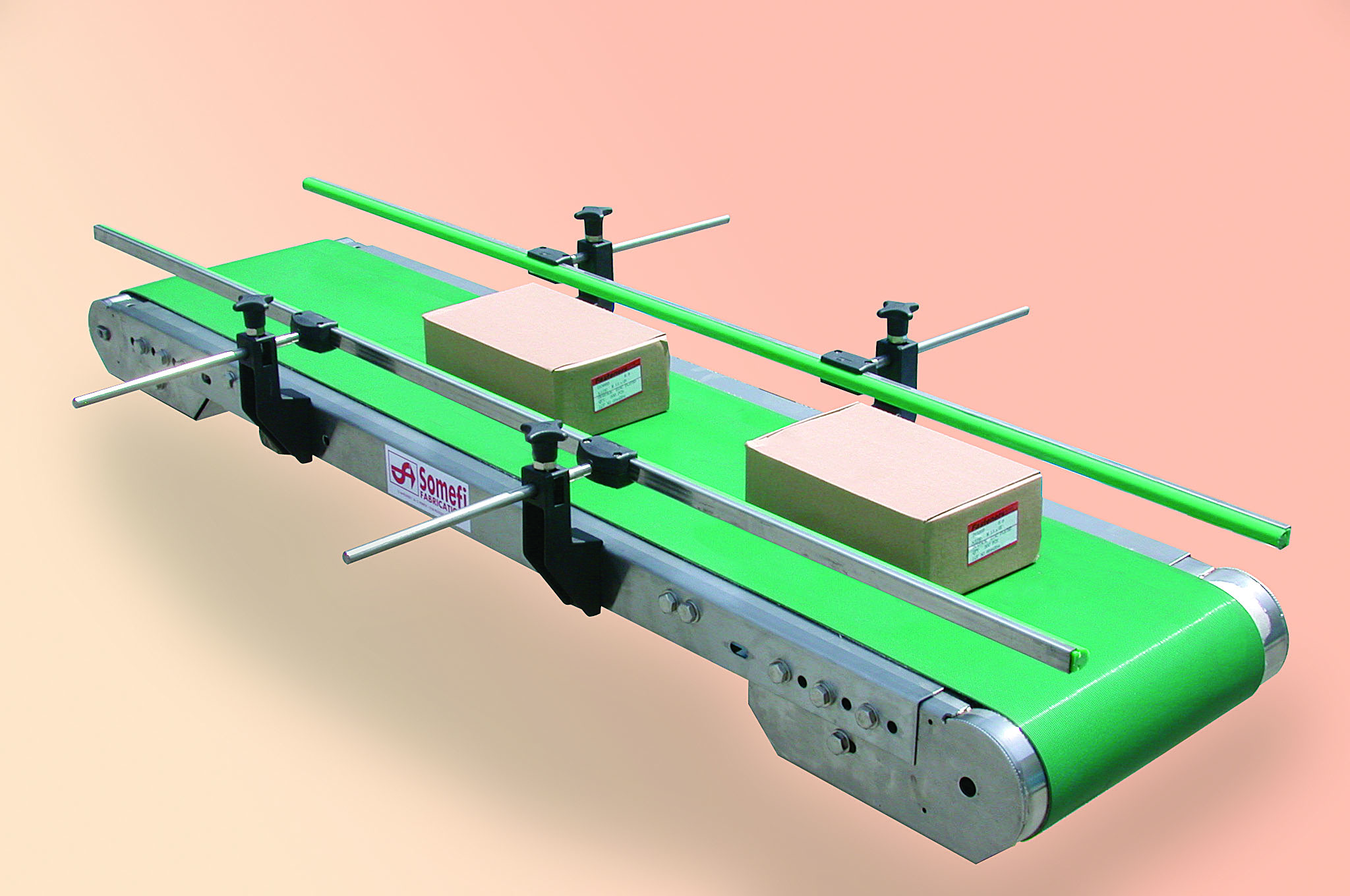
The ERGO 30 INOX conveyor belt with its hardware showing

Steel belts are generally made from carbon steel or stainless steel which has been alloyed or treated depending on the application.

Compared to plastic belts, steel belts are generally more expensive upfront, but it can offer better durability. Over time, a steel belt may develop deformations or curvature due to wear and tear. These deformations can be rectified through various methods such as shot peening to flatten out the cross curvature of deformed steel belts. This process can be performed on-site without interrupting production.

The two main systems using steel belts are single-belt and double-belt systems. Single-belt systems are appropriate for manufacturing single-sided products such as pastilles, flakes, strips, and sheets. The double-belt system can manufacture the top and bottom of a product simultaneously, such as in chemical, rubber, laminate, and composite material processing operations.

== Types ==
=== Ground ===
Ground stainless steel belts are normally produced with surface roughness ranging from 0.4 μm down to 0.1 μm, with well-rounded edges, and developed for level and straight contour. Such belts are supplied in open lengths, with the ends prepared for welding on site, or in endless condition with a welded joint.

=== Perforated ===
Perforated steel belts enable the drying media, for example hot air, to be transferred 'through' the belt, so that the air is in contact with all parts of the product on the belt. Normally, manufacturers offer perforated belts with five standard perforation patterns which cover most requirements. Other patterns, with a minimum hole diameter of 0.8 mm (0.03 in.) and different spacing, can be provided to suit specific applications.

=== Polished ===
Mirror polished stainless-steel belts to produce several types of thin film and ceramic sheets. The belts are available in thickness from 0.60 to 2.00 mm (0.02362 to 0.0787 in.) with thickness variation less than or equal to 80 μm. Polished steel belts are produced endlessly or as open-length belts.

=== Seamless ===
Seamless steel belts are suitable for the production of high-quality plastic foils and films, such as optical and packaging films. The thickness of these belts typically ranges from 0.03 to 0.60 mm (or 0.012 to 0.23 in.). They are particularly useful for machines with narrow drum diameters that require the use of wide belts.

=== Solid ===
Solid stainless-steel belts are, as standard, delivered in cold-rolled condition with a mill finish of Ra < 0.4 μm and have rounded edges. Carbon steel belts are, as standard, delivered in a hardened and tempered condition with a mill finish of Ra < 0.4 μm and have rounded edges. Solid steel belts are leveled and straightened to obtain flatness and straightness and are supplied in open lengths, with the ends prepared for welding on site, or in endless condition with a welded joint.

== Usage ==
=== Food industry ===
Steel belts used in the food business are made to be sanitary, simple to clean, dependable, and flexible in their use. They are employed in the cooking process as well as the drying and steaming of perishables, the freeze-drying of instant coffee, the casting of caramel and other candies, and the formation of chocolate droplets.

=== Chemical industry ===
Stainless-steel belts are part of continuous production processes. Unlike conveyor belts used purely for transportation purposes, steel belts used in this industry serve as media for transferring heat and/or pressure. Applications for steel belts in the chemical industry include casting, polymerizing of resins, waxes, paraffins and many other substances.

=== Transportation ===
Steel belts may be used to move the finished product or raw material or in parcel sorting systems, transporting of bottles, bulk loads, bricks, machinery parts and the like. Straight tracking, high abrasion resistance, and dynamic fatigue strength are crucial when transporting bulky material or unit load. Extremely high operating speeds cause a high number of load cycles and create severe operating conditions. Steel belts can be made to suit these extreme requirements.

=== Wood processing ===
Steel belts play an essential role in modern, continuous production processes for wood-based panels (WBP) such as particle boards, OSB- and MDF boards, where they serve as heat and pressure transfer media at the same time. As the steel belt surface has a direct influence on the final panel surface quality, this application imposes high demands on steel belts regarding thickness uniformity and surface finish.
