= Belter (play-by-mail game) =

Play-by-mail role-playing game

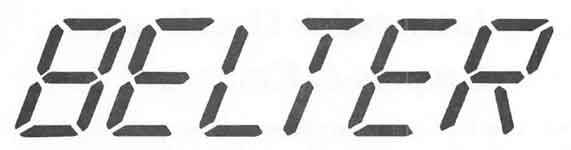
- Publisher Title
- Publishers: Classified Information
- Years active: ~1990 to unknown
- Genres: science fiction, space opera, role-playing
- Languages: English
- Players: 100
- Playing time: fixed
- Materials required: Instructions, order sheets, turn results, paper, pencil
- Media type: Play-by-mail or email

Belter is a closed-end, play-by-mail science fiction space opera game. Set in the year 2050, it features 100 players leading space corporations competing to profit from asteroid belt mineral extraction. Each game ends when three players meet the victory conditions. Belter received positive reviews in gaming magazines during the early 1990s.

== History and development ==
Belter was a closed-ended, space-based play-by-mail (PBM) game focused on corporate warfare. It was published by Classified Information. Reviewer Stewart Wieck compared it favorably to It's a Crime.

== Gameplay ==
The game was set in outer space in the year 2050. Each game featured 100 players competing for dominance, with three declared winners upon meeting specific victory conditions. Player led corporations aiming to profit from mineral extraction in the asteroid belt. These corporations employed Scientists, Soldiers, and Workers. Each game lasted between 25 and 35 turns.

== Reception ==
Bob Bost reviewed the game in the April issue of Flagship, stating: "My final judgment is favorable. This is a low-medium complexity game that is great for a filler if you have some very complex games: it will not take much time but will provide a lot of enjoyment." Stewart Wieck reviewed Belter in the June–July 1991 issue of White Wolf, writing, "Overall, Belter is a top-notch PBM game. It's good for beginners and the challenge of watching so many different factors will keep even veterans enthralled for a while." He rated it 3 out of 5 for Diplomacy and Materials, 4 for Strategy, 5 for Moderation, and gave it an overall score of 4.

== See also ==
- It's a Crime
- List of play-by-mail games

== Bibliography ==
- Bost, Bob (April 1991). "Corporate War in the Belt". Flagship. No. 31 (U.S. ed.). pp. 8–9.
- Wieck, Stewart (June–July 1991). "PBM Corner: Belter". White Wolf. No. 27. pp. 48–49.
