= Daniel Komissarov =

Russian Iranologist (1907–2008)

Daniel Samuilovich (Semyonovich) Komissarov (1907–2008) is a Russian Iranologist and distinguished professor of Persian literature.

He acted as a professor at Leningrad University for years and was a member of USSR academy of science. Komissarov worked significantly on the literary works of Sadeq Hedayat. He translated works of classical Persian poets as Rudaki and modern writers as Simin Daneshvar, Sadeq Choubak and Said Nafisi.

== See also ==
- Iranian culture
- Iranistics
