= Albrecht Neubert =

Albrecht Gotthold Neubert (Hartenstein, Saxony, 3 March 1930 - Leipzig, 1 June 2017) was a German translation scholar and lecturer in English language. Together with Gert Jäger and Otto Kade he was a notable member of the Leipzig School.

== Memberships ==
- Saxon Academy of Sciences and Humanities
- East German Academy of Sciences
- Institute for Applied Linguistics, Kent State University
- New York Academy of Sciences
- International Association of Applied Linguistics
- International Federation for Modern Languages and Literatures
- Gesellschaft für Angewandte Linguistik
- Deutsche Shakespeare-Gesellschaft

== Selected works ==
- Die Stilformen der „Erlebten Rede" im neueren englischen Roman. Niemeyer, Halle 1957 (Diss.)
- Semantischer Positivismus in den USA. Ein kritischer Beitrag zum Studium der Zusammenhänge zwischen Sprache und Gesellschaft. Habilitationsschrift. Niemeyer, Halle 1962.
- with Barbara Hansen, Klaus Hansen und Manfred Schentke: Englische Lexikologie. Einführung in Wortbildung und lexikalische Semantik. Enzyklopädie, Leipzig 1982, ISBN 3-324-00451-9. (3rd edition 1990)
- Englische Aussprache. Eine Einführung in die Phonetik des Englischen (with an LP). Enzyklopädie, Leipzig 1964, ISBN 3-324-00269-9. (14th edition 1989)
- Text and Translation. (= Übersetzungswissenschaftliche Beiträge. Band 8). Enzyklopädie, Leipzig 1985.
- mit Erika Gröger: Handwörterbuch Englisch – Deutsch. Enzyklopädie, Leipzig 1988, ISBN 3-324-00155-2. (3rd edition 1991)
- Theoria cum Praxi. Theoretische Einsichten und praktische Ausblicke. (= Schriften des BDÜ. Band 15). BDÜ Weiterbildungs- und Fachverlagsgesellschaft, Berlin 2006, ISBN 3-938430-07-9.
- Aufsätze und Beiträge. Theoretische Einsichten und praktische Ausblicke. (= Schriften des BDÜ. Band 16). BDÜ Weiterbildungs- und Fachverlagsgesellschaft, Berlin 2006, ISBN 3-938430-08-7.
- Das unendliche Geschäft des Übersetzens. Hirzel, Stuttgart/ Leipzig 2007, ISBN 978-3-7776-1526-4.
