= Herbert Belter =

- Born: 21 December 1929; Greifswald, Weimar Republic
- Died: 28 April 1951 (aged 21); Moscow, Russian SFSR, Soviet Union
- Cause of death: Execution by shooting
- Citizenship: East Germany
- Occupations: Student, resistance member

Herbert Belter (December 21, 1929 – April 28, 1951) was a resistance activist in East Germany. He was executed because of his activities in the so-called "Belter Group", which was named after him.

== Life and education ==
Between 1936 and 1945, Herbert Belter attended middle school in Rostock. His desire to graduate from high school was at first prevented by the chaos after the war. From October 1946 to 1948, Belter instead took up an apprenticeship as a business clerk at the business school in Rostock. During this time, he also worked for the Rostock harbour authorities in Rostock and took evening school classes. After receiving his high school diploma from evening school in July 1949, he applied at the Leipzig University. He enrolled as an Economics and Social Sciences student in October 1949.

== Political resistance and execution ==
At the university, Belter increasingly witnessed political repression and forced ideological alignment of the university's institutions. Despite being warned by a wave of arrests of democratic students, the dissolution of the student council and the imprisonment of its chairman Wolfgang Natonek in 1948, Belter decided to take up opposition work. He gathered a group of like-minded students around him and started to pass information about the situation in East Germany to the RIAS. He also began to distribute leaflets at the university to counter the SED's information monopoly.

On the occasion of the first "elections" of the People's Chamber, the group distributed leaflets which called for free elections in the inner city of Leipzig. On his way back home, Herbert Belter was arrested by the police. A subsequent house search delivered further leaflets and writings as well as information on Belter's comrades.

The police handed over the members of the Belter group to the MGB. The prisoners were transferred to Moscow and put to trial in a secret proceeding. On January 20, 1951, Herbert Belter was sentenced to death as the group leader. His nine comrades were mostly sentenced to 25 years of heavy labor. During the trial, Belter admitted the accusations put up against him: "I have acted illegally because I was dissatisfied with the situation at the Leipzig University. We didn't have freedom of thought, freedom of speech and freedom of press."

Herbert Belter was executed on April 28, 1951, under exclusion of the public. The trial and the execution remained secret until the incidents could be reconstructed after the opening of Russian archives in 1990. The Russian judiciary has officially rehabilitated Belter on May 23, 1994.

Belter's body was cremated and his ashes were thrown in a mass grave at the Donskoi Cemetery.
