= Balteus =

Balteus may refer to:

- The girdle of a Biblical Jewish priest
- A sword belt worn by the Roman legionary; see Baldric#Roman balteus
- In Ionic architecture, an ornamental band that encircles the pulvinus, or bolster of the capital
- The sub-cinctorium, a papal garment
- A boss in the game Armored Core VI: Fires of Rubicon
