= Vilen Komissarov =

Russian translator (1924–2005)

Komissarov Vilen Naumovitch

Personal details
- Born: August 23, 1924 Yalta, USSR
- Died: June 8, 2005 (aged 80) Moscow, Russia

Professor Vilen Naumovich Komissarov (Russian: Вилен Наумович Комиссаров; August 23, 1924 – June 8, 2005) was a Soviet and later Russian linguist. He specialised in the field of translation theory and methods of translator training. He served as Head of the Department of Translation Theory, History and Criticism at Moscow State Linguistic University. He also worked as a conference interpreter and translator.

== Selected bibliography ==
Komissarov has over ninety publications, including books.

- A Word on Translation (1973)
- Linguistics of Translation (1980)
- Theory of Translation (1990)
- Theoretical Basic of Methods of Translator Training (1997)
- General Theory of Translation (1999)
