= Hippolytushoef =

- Town
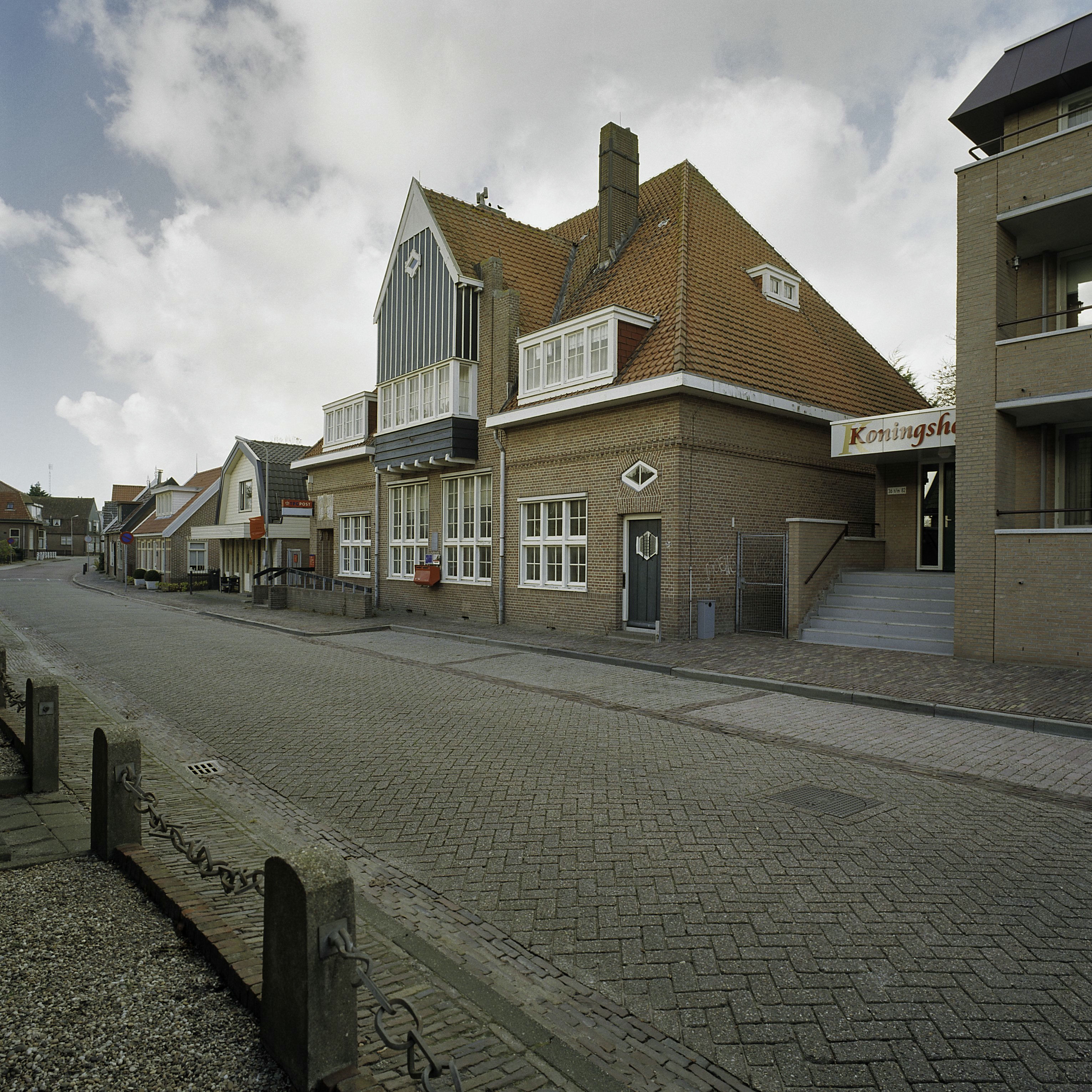

- Location in the Netherlands Location in the province of North Holland in the Netherlands
- Coordinates: 52°54′N 4°58′E
- Country: Netherlands
- Province: North Holland
- Municipality: Hollands Kroon

Area
  - Total: 17.27 km^{2} (6.67 sq mi)
- Elevation: 2.9 m (9.5 ft)

Population (2025)
  - Total: 5,120
  - Density: 296/km^{2} (768/sq mi)
- Time zone: UTC+1 (CET)
  - Summer (DST): UTC+2 (CEST)
- Postal code: 1777
- Dialing code: 0227

Hippolytushoef, abbreviated locally as Hippo, is a town in the western Netherlands, located in the municipality of Hollands Kroon, North Holland, 14 km east of Den Helder.

== History ==
The village was first mentioned in 1343 or 1344 as "van Ypolshove", and is a combination of "farmland" and Hippolytus of Rome. Hippolytushoef was the main village of the former island Wieringen and originates in the 12th century.

The Dutch Reformed church is a single aisled church with a large tower with brick spire. The tower dates from the 13th century and the spire was added in the 15th century. In 1674, the church was destroyed and rebuilt the next year. In 1893, the choir collapsed and was rebuilt 1895 by Joseph Cuypers.

Hippolytushoef was home to 340 people in 1840. Until 2012, Hippolytushoef was the capital of the former municipality of Wieringen that merged into Hollands Kroon.

== Gallery ==
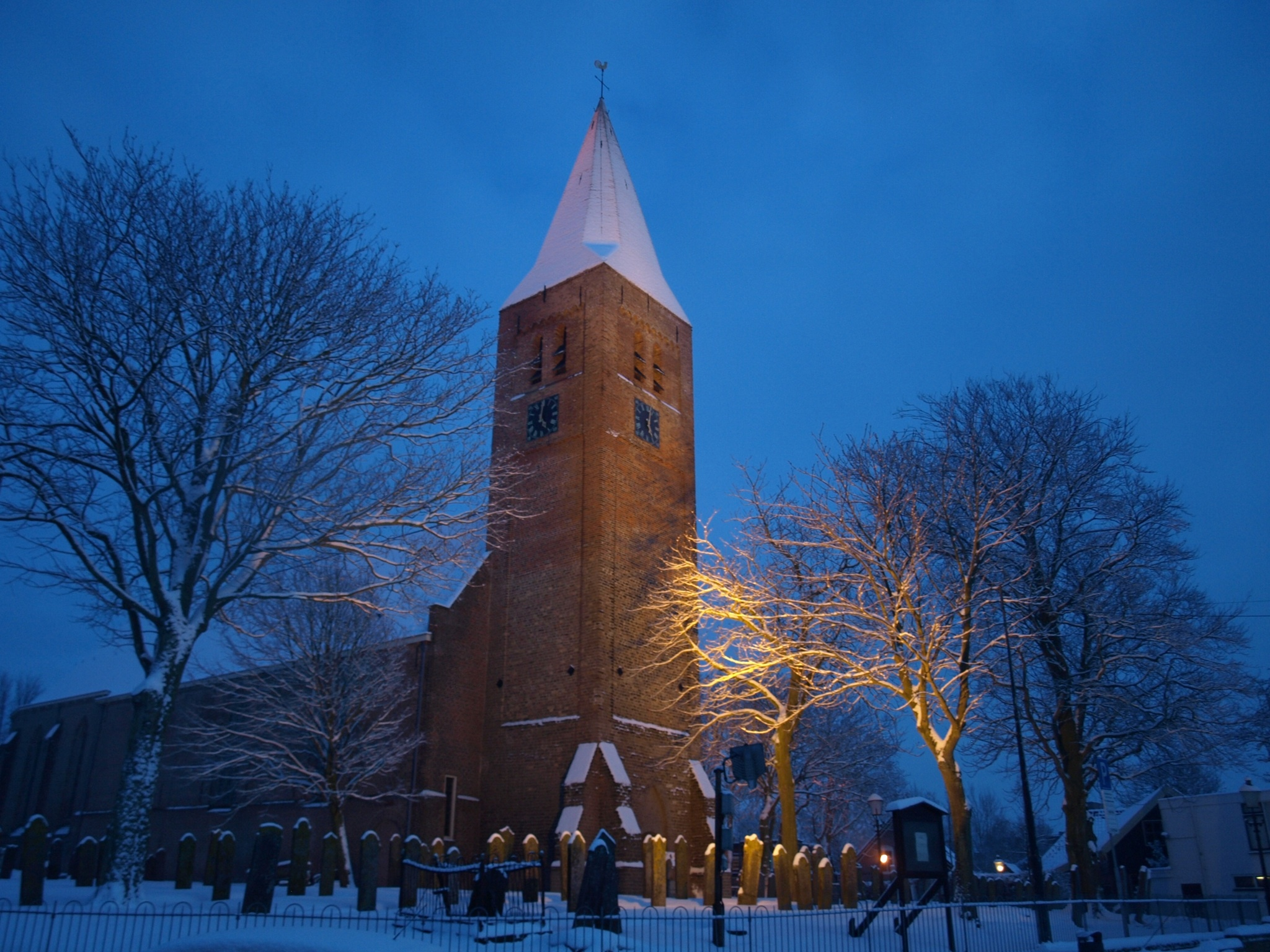
Dutch Reformed church in winter

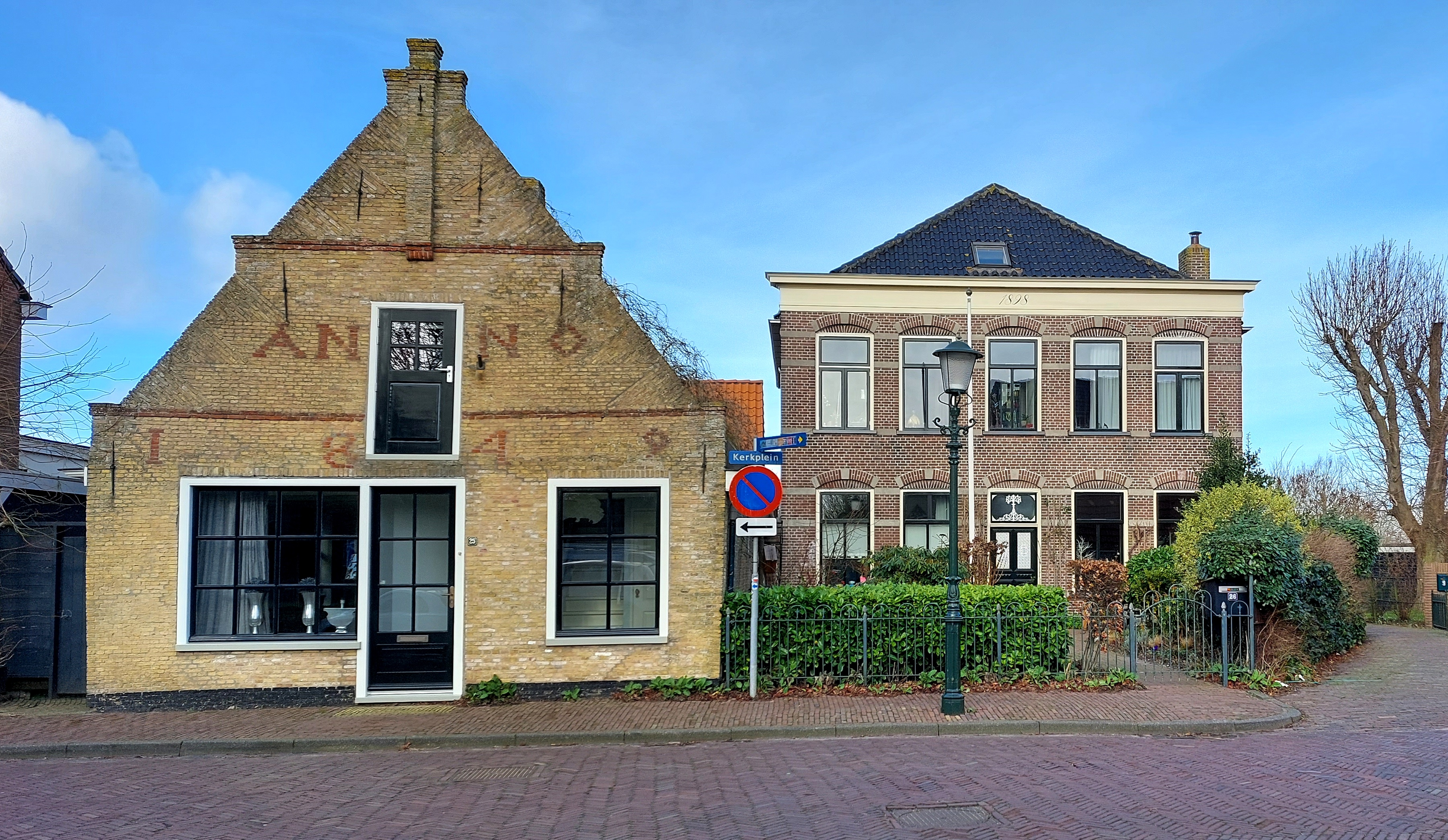
Houses in Hippolytushoef

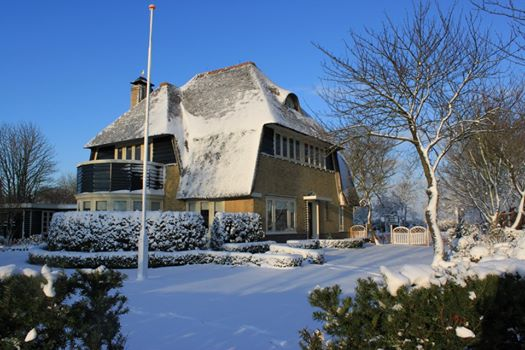
Villa in Hippolytushoef

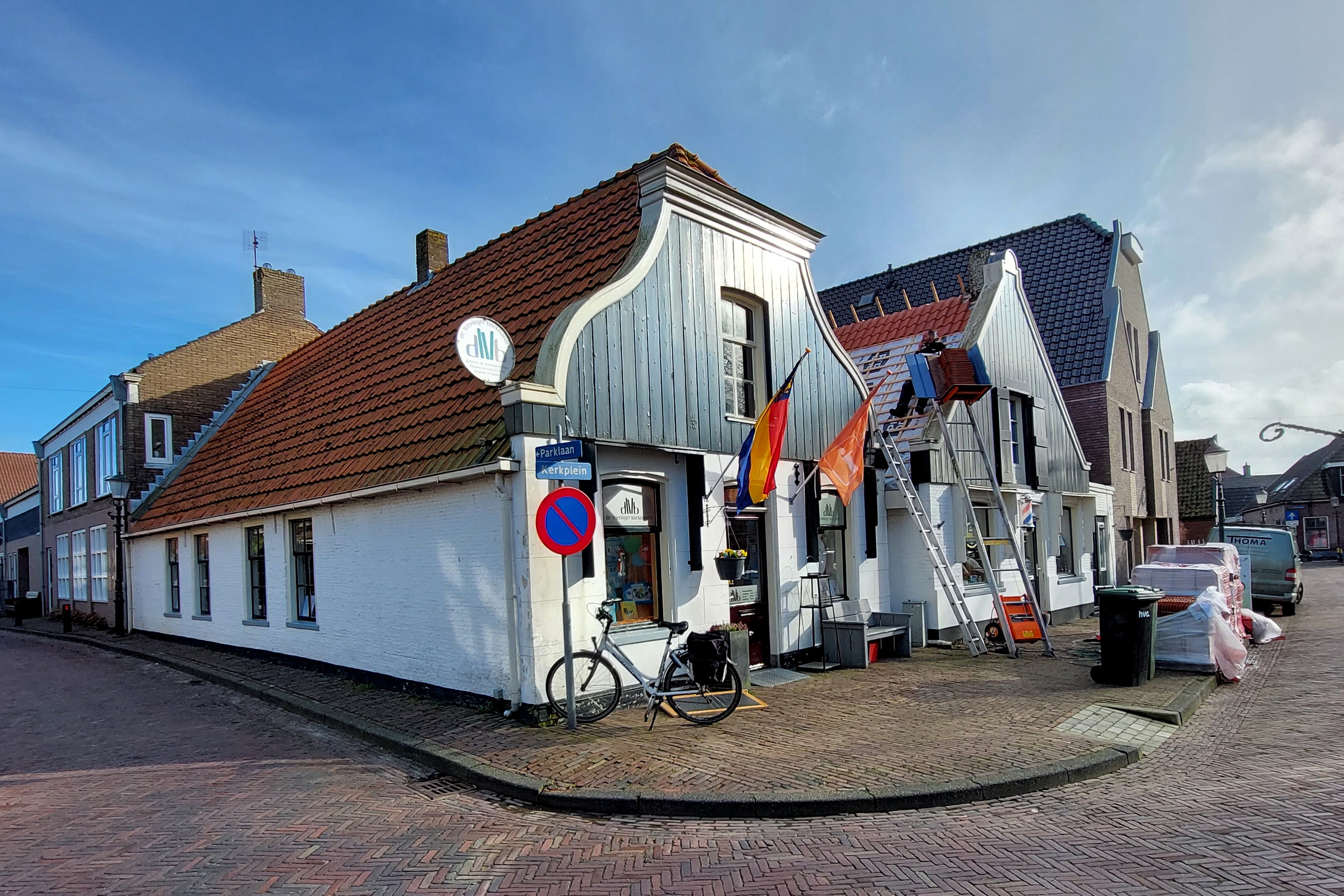
Shop in Hippolytushoef
