= Burrau =

Burrau is a Danish surname. Notable people with the surname include:

- Carl Jensen Burrau (1867–1944), Danish mathematician
- Øyvind Burrau (1896–1979), Danish physicist
