= Holstein–Herring method =

Numeric method in quantum chemistry

The Holstein–Herring method, also called the surface integral method, or Smirnov's method is an effective means of getting the exchange energy splittings of asymptotically degenerate energy states in molecular systems. Although the exchange energy becomes elusive at large internuclear systems, it is of prominent importance in theories of molecular binding and magnetism. This splitting results from the symmetry under exchange of identical nuclei (Pauli exclusion principle). The basic idea was pioneered by Theodore Holstein, Conyers Herring and Boris M. Smirnov in the 1950s–1960s.

== Theory ==
The method can be illustrated for the hydrogen molecular ion or more generally, atom-ion systems or one-active-electron systems, as follows. We consider states that are represented by even or odd functions with respect to behavior under space inversion. This is denoted with the suffixes g and u from the German gerade and ungerade and are standard practice for the designation of electronic states of diatomic molecules, whereas for atomic states the terms even and odd are used.

The electronic time-independent Schrödinger equation can be written as
$$\left(-\frac{\hbar^2}{2m} \nabla^2 + V\right) \psi = E \psi,$$
where E is the (electronic) energy of a given quantum-mechanical state (eigenstate), with the electronic state function $\psi = \psi(\mathbf{r})$ depending on the spatial coordinates of the electron, and where $V$ is the electron–nuclear Coulomb potential energy function. For the hydrogen molecular ion, this is
$$V = -\frac{e^2}{4 \pi \varepsilon_0} \left(\frac{1}{r_a} + \frac{1}{r_b}\right).$$

For any gerade (or even) state, the electronic Schrödinger wave equation can be written in atomic units ($\hbar = m = e = 4 \pi \varepsilon_0 = 1$) as
$$\left(-\frac{1}{2} \nabla^2 + V(\mathbf{x})\right) \psi_+ = E_+ \psi_+.$$
For any ungerade (or odd) state, the corresponding wave equation can be written as
$$\left(-\frac{1}{2} \nabla^2 + V(\mathbf{x})\right) \psi_- = E_- \psi_-.$$
For simplicity, we assume real functions (although the result can be generalized to the complex case). We then multiply the gerade wave equation by $\psi_-$ on the left and the ungerade wave equation on the left by $\psi_+$ and subtract to obtain
$$\psi_+ \nabla^2 \psi_- - \psi_- \nabla^2 \psi_+ = -2\Delta E \, \psi_- \psi_+,$$
where $\Delta E = E_- - E_+$ is the exchange energy splitting. Next, without loss of generality, we define orthogonal single-particle functions $\phi_A$ and $\phi_B$ located at the nuclei and write
$$\psi_+ = \frac{1}{\sqrt{2}} (\phi_A + \phi_B), \qquad \psi_- = \frac{1}{\sqrt{2}} (\phi_A - \phi_B).$$

This is similar to the linear combination of atomic orbitals (LCAO) method used in quantum chemistry, but we emphasize that the functions $\phi_A$ and $\phi_B$ are in general polarized, i.e. they are not pure eigenfunctions of angular momentum with respect to their nuclear center, see also below). Note, however, that in the limit as $R \to \infty$, these localized functions $\phi_{A,B}$ collapse into the well-known atomic (hydrogenic) psi functions $\phi_{A,B}$. We denote $M$ as the mid-plane located exactly between the two nuclei (see diagram for hydrogen molecular ion for more details), with $\mathbf{z}$ representing the unit normal vector of this plane (which is parallel to the Cartesian $z$ direction), so that the full $\mathbf{R}^3$ space is divided into left ($L$) and right ($R$) halves. By considerations of symmetry,
$$\psi_-|_M  = \mathbf{z} \cdot \nabla \psi_+|_M = 0.$$
This implies that
$$\phi_A|_M = \phi_B|_M, \qquad
\mathbf{z} \cdot \nabla \phi_A|_M = -\mathbf{z} \cdot \nabla \phi_B|_M.$$
Also, these localized functions are normalized, which leads to
$$\int_L \phi_A^2 \,dV = \int_R \phi_B^2 \,dV$$
and conversely. Integration of the above in the whole space left to the mid-plane yields
$$2 \int_L \psi_+ \psi_- \,dV =
\int_L (\phi_A^2 - \phi_B^2) \,dV = 1 - 2 \int_R \phi_A^2 \,dV$$
and
$$\int_L (\psi_+ \nabla^2 \psi_- - \psi_- \nabla^2 \psi_+) \,dV =
\int_L (\phi_B \nabla^2 \phi_A - \phi_A \nabla^2 \phi_B) \,dV.$$

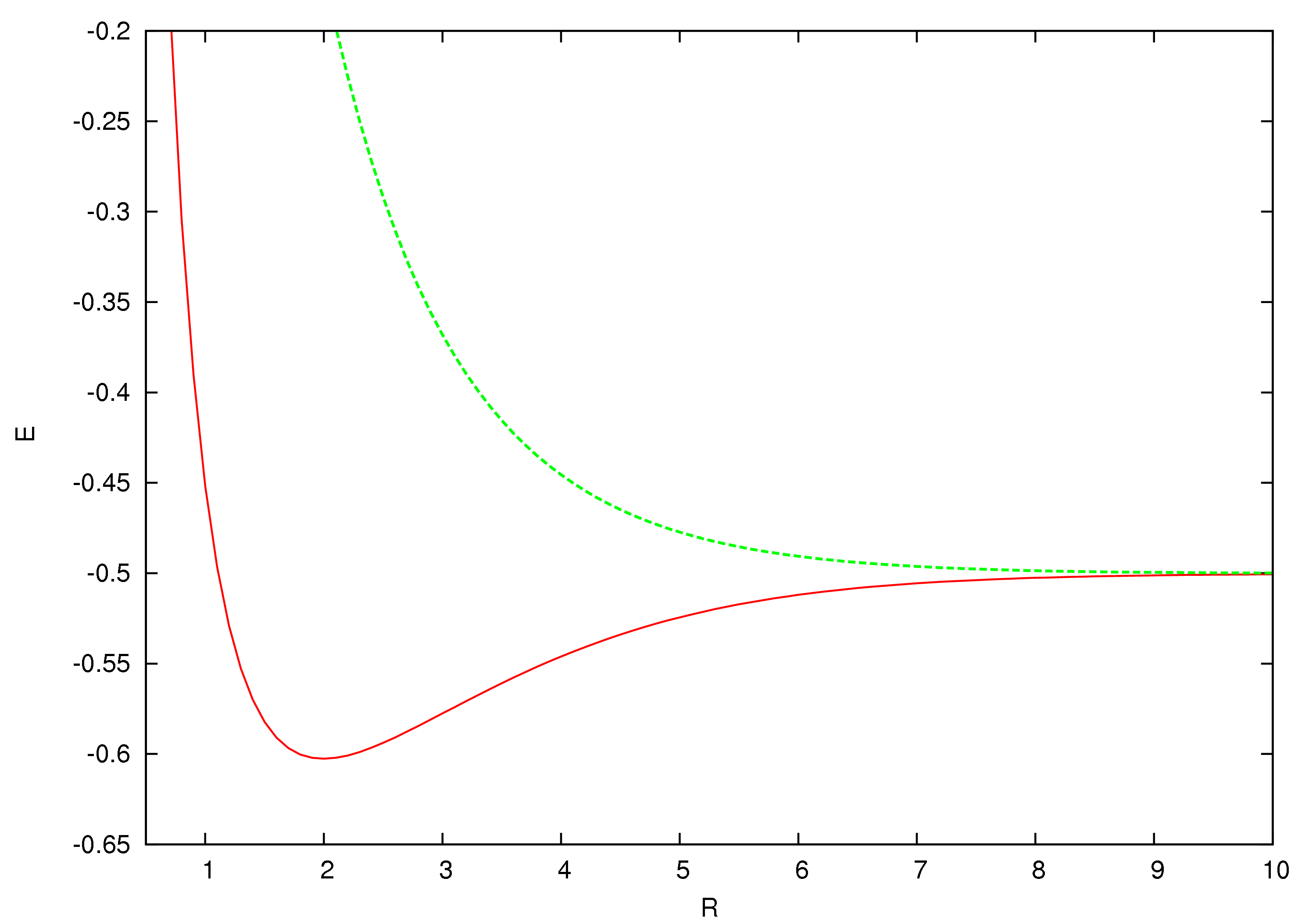
Energies E of the two lowest discrete states of the hydrogen molecular ion $\ce{H2+}$ as a function of inter-nuclear distance R in atomic units

From a variation of the divergence theorem on the above, we finally obtain
$$\Delta E = -2 \frac{\int_M \phi_A \nabla \phi_A \cdot d\mathbf{S}}
{1 - 2 \int_R \phi_A^2 \,dV},$$
where $d\mathbf{S}$ is a differential surface element of the mid-plane. This is the Holstein–Herring formula. From the latter, Conyers Herring was the first to show that the lead term for the asymptotic expansion of the energy difference between the two lowest states of the hydrogen molecular ion, namely the first excited state $2p \sigma_u$ and the ground state $1s \sigma_g$ (as expressed in molecular notation—see graph for energy curves), was found to be
$$\Delta E = E_- - E_+ = \frac{4}{e} R e^{-R}.$$
Previous calculations based on the LCAO of atomic orbitals had erroneously given a lead coefficient of $4/3$ instead of $4/e$. While it is true that for the hydrogen molecular ion, the eigenenergies can be mathematically expressed in terms of a generalization of the Lambert W function, these asymptotic formulae are more useful in the long range, and the Holstein–Herring method has a much wider range of applications than this particular molecule.

== Applications ==
The Holstein–Herring formula had limited applications until around 1990 when Kwong-Tin Tang, Jan Peter Toennies, and C. L. Yiu demonstrated that $\phi_A$ can be a polarized wave function, i.e. an atomic wave function localized at a particular nucleus but perturbed by the other nuclear center, and consequently without apparent gerade or ungerade symmetry, and nonetheless the Holstein–Herring formula above can be used to generate the correct asymptotic series expansions for the exchange energies. In this way, one has successfully recast a two-center formulation into an effective one-center formulation. Subsequently, it has been applied with success to one-active electron systems. Later, Scott et al. explained and clarified their results while sorting out subtle but important issues concerning the true convergence of the polarized wave function.

The outcome meant that it was possible to solve for the asymptotic exchange energy splittings to any order. The Holstein–Herring method has been extended to the two-active electron case, i.e. the hydrogen molecule for the two lowest discrete states of $\ce{H2}$ and also for general atom–atom systems.

== Physical interpretation ==
The Holstein–Herring formula can be physically interpreted as the electron undergoing "quantum tunnelling" between both nuclei, thus creating a current whose flux through the mid-plane allows us to isolate the exchange energy. The energy is thus shared, i.e. exchanged, between the two nuclear centers. Related to the tunnelling effect, a complementary interpretation from Sidney Coleman's Aspects of Symmetry (1985) has an "instanton" travelling near and about the classical paths within path-integral formulation. Note that the volume integral in the denominator of the Holstein–Herring formula is sub-dominant in $R$. Consequently this denominator is almost unity for sufficiently large internuclear distances $R$, and only the surface integral of the numerator need be considered.

== See also ==
- Dirac delta function model (1-D version of H_{2}^{+})
- Exchange interaction – Quantum mechanical effect
- Exchange symmetry – Particular symmetry of the multiple-particle states
- Hydrogen molecular ion – Two hydrogen nuclei sharing one electron
- Quantum tunnelling – Quantum mechanical phenomenon
- List of quantum-mechanical systems with analytical solutions
