= Edmond–Ogston model =

The Edmond–Ogston model is a thermodynamic model proposed by Elizabeth Edmond and Alexander George Ogston in 1968 to describe phase separation of two-component polymer mixtures in a common solvent. At the core of the model is an expression for the Helmholtz free energy $F$

$$\ F =  RTV(\,c_1\ln\ c_1 + c_2\ln\ c_2 + B_{11} {c_1}^2 + B_{22} {c_2}^2 + 2 B_{12} {c_1} {c_2}) \,$$

that takes into account terms in the concentration of the polymers up to second order, and needs three Virial coefficients $B_{11}, B_{12}$ and $B_{22}$ as input. Here $c_i$ is the molar concentration of polymer $i$, $R$ is the universal gas constant, $T$ is the absolute temperature, $V$ is the system volume. It is possible to obtain explicit solutions for the coordinates of the critical point

$$(c_{1,c},c_{2,c}) = (\frac{1}{2(B_{12} \cdot S_c-B_{11})} \,,\frac{1}{2(B_{12}/S_c-B_{22})} \,)$$,

where $-S_c$ represents the slope of the binodal and spinodal in the critical point. Its value can be obtained by solving a third order polynomial in $\sqrt{S_c}$,

$$\ B_{22} {\sqrt{S_c}}^3 + B_{12} {\sqrt{S_c}}^2 - B_{12} {\sqrt{S_c}} - B_{11} = 0 \,$$,

which can be done analytically using Cardano's method and choosing the solution for which both $c_{1,c}$ and $c_{2,c}$ are positive.

The spinodal can be expressed analytically too, and the Lambert W function has a central role to express the coordinates of binodal and tie-lines.

The model is closely related to the Flory–Huggins model.

The model and its solutions have been generalized to mixtures with an arbitrary number of components $N$, with $N$ greater or equal than 2.
