= Theodore Holstein =

American theoretical physicist (1915–1985)

- Born: September 18, 1915; New York City, United States
- Died: May 8, 1985 (aged 69); San Pedro, Los Angeles, United States
- Education: New York University
- Known for: Holstein equation Holstein–Herring method Holstein–Primakoff transformation Fröhlich-Holstein Hamiltonian
- Scientific career
- Fields: Condensed matter physics
- Workplaces: New York University; University of California, Los Angeles; University of Pittsburgh; Westinghouse Electric Corporation
- Thesis: Passage of Neutrons through Ferromagnetic Materials (1943)
- Doctoral advisor: Otto Halpern

Theodore David Holstein (18 September 1915 – 8 May 1985) was an American theoretical physicist, specialized in solid-state physics and atomic physics.

With Henry Primakoff in 1940 he introduced the Holstein-Primakoff transformation, of importance for the theory of spin waves. Other significant papers included the polaron (introduction of the small polaron), infrared absorption of metals, a microscopic theory of the collision drag phenomenon by Brian Pippard, Bloch electrons in magnetic fields (Hall effect) and his review on the transport properties in an electron-phonon gas. He corrected the Förster-Dexter theory of photoinduced energy transfer between molecules and found new mechanisms for energy transfer in disordered systems. He is also known for introducing the Holstein–Herring method.

== Life ==
Theodore David Holstein was born in 1915 in New York City, United States.

Holstein studied at New York University, earning a bachelor's degree in 1935 and his master's degree was earned at Columbia University in 1936.

For his PhD studies he returned to New York University. His thesis Passage of Neutrons through Ferromagnetic Materials was supervised by Otto Halpern, and he earned his degree in 1940.

From 1941 he worked in a research lab at Westinghouse Electric Corporation. In 1960, he left Westinghouse and became a professor at the University of Pittsburgh. In 1965 he became a professor at the University of California, Los Angeles.

His most notable contribution to atomic physics was in 1947 when he was the first to treat the capture of resonance radiation in gases correctly (later applied in laser physics, astrophysics and photochemistry, but was also applied to phonons and in the solid state).

Holstein died in San Pedro, Los Angeles in 1985 due to a heart attack.

== Memberships and fellowships ==
He became a member of the American Academy of Arts and Sciences, and the National Academy of Sciences in 1976 and 1981, respectively.
