= Karel Niessen =

Dutch physicist (1895–1967)

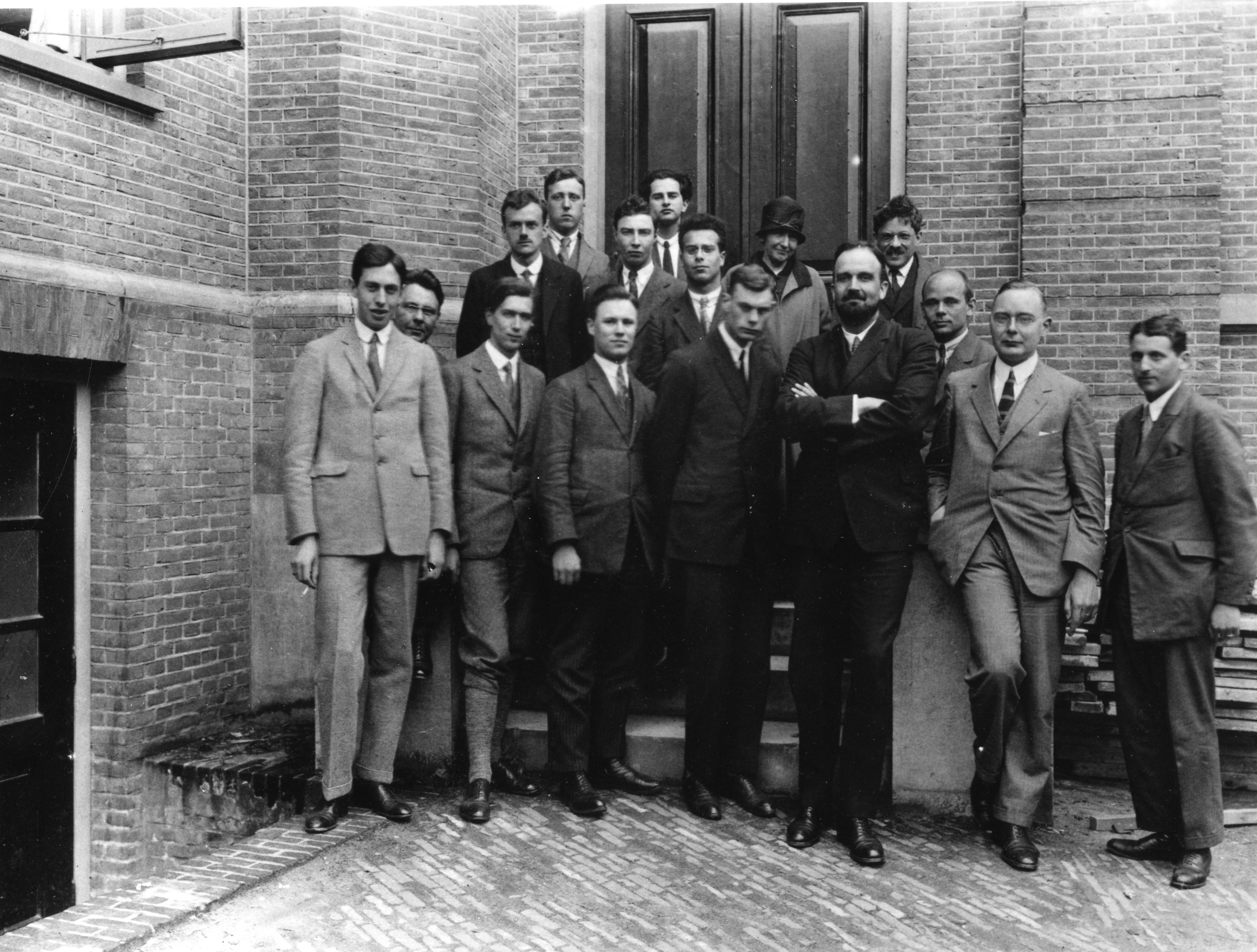
Niessen (second from left) at Leiden university

Karel Frederik Niessen (1895 in Velsen – 1967) was a Dutch theoretical physicist who made contributions to quantum mechanics and is known for the Pauli–Niessen model.

== Education ==
Niessen began his studies in physics at the University of Utrecht in 1914. In 1922, he received his doctorate under L. S. Ornstein. He was an assistant at the University from 1921 to 1928, except for his postdoctoral study and research at the Ludwig-Maximilians-Universität München under Arnold Sommerfeld, 1925 to 1926 on a Rockefeller Foundation Fellowship. He also spent 1928 to 1929 on a Rockefeller Foundation Fellowship at the University of Wisconsin–Madison.

In 1922, Niessen’s doctoral thesis, as well as Wolfgang Pauli’s extended doctoral thesis, dealt with the hydrogen molecule ion in the Bohr–Sommerfeld framework. Their work is referred to as the Pauli-Niessen model. Their works helped to show the inadequacy of the old quantum mechanics, which gave physicists the impetus to explore new paths which led to the matrix mechanics formulation of quantum mechanics by Werner Heisenberg and Max Born in 1925 and the wave mechanics formulation by Erwin Schrödinger in 1926, which were shown to be equivalent.

== Career ==
Upon Niessen’s return to the Netherlands in 1929, he took a lifelong position as a theoretical physicist at Philips Electronics in Eindhoven.

== Selected publications ==
- Karel F. Niessen Zur Quantentheorie des Wasserstoffmolekülions, doctoral dissertation, University of Utrecht, Utrecht: I. Van Druten (1922) as cited in Mehra, Volume 5, Part 2, 2001, p. 932.
- K. F. Niessen Zur Quantentheorie des Wasserstoffmolekülions, Annalen der Physik 70 129-134 (1923)
- K. F. Niessen Ableitung des Planckschen Strahlungsgesetzes für Atome mit zwei Freiheitsgraden, Annalen der Physik 75 743–780 (1924)
- K. F. Niessen (Utrecht) Die Energieberechnung in einem sehr vereinfachten Vierkörperproblem, Zeitschrift für Physik Volume 43, Numbers 9-10, Pages 675-693 (1927). Received 14 April 1927.
- K. F. Niessen Überdie annähernden komplexen Lösungen der Schrödingerschen Differentialgleichun für den harmonischen Oszillator, Annalen der Physik 85 487-514 (1928) as cited in Jammer, 1966, p. 279.
- K. F. Niessen On the Saturation of the Electric and Magnetic Polarization of Gases in Quantum Mechanics, Phys. Rev. 34 253 - 278 (1929). Department of Physics, University of Wisconsin–Madison. Received 1 June 1929.
- K. F. Niessen (Physics Department, Madison, Wisconsin) Ein Gas in gekreuzten Feldern nach der Quantenmechanik Journal Zeitschrift für Physik, Volume 58, Numbers 1-2, Pages 63–74 (1929). Received 13 July 1929.
- K. F. Niessen Über das akustische analogon der sommerfeldschen oberflächenwelle Niessen, K. F. Physica 8 (3) 337-343 (1941)
- K. F. Niessen On one of Heisenberg's hypotheses in the theory of specific heat of superconductors, Physica 16 (2) 77-83 (1950)
