= George Cecil Jaffe =

Russian chemist

George Cecil Jaffé (16 January 1880 in Moscow – 18 March 1965), received his doctorate in chemistry in 1903 from the University of Leipzig, where he studied under Nobel laureate Wilhelm Ostwald. He worked briefly at Cambridge and then the Curie Laboratory, where he worked with both J.J. Thomson and Pierre Curie. He eventually rose to full professor at the University of Giessen, however, with the rise of Nazism he was dismissed from his position. He eventually immigrated to the US and became a professor at Louisiana State University.

Jaffé is best known for his classic paper "Zur Theorie der Ionisation in Kolonnen" (Theory of columnar ionization), which was published in 1913. In it he proposes a model for charge recombination and charge collection efficiency for a "column" of charge generated by ionizing radiation.

He also did theoretical work on the dihydrogen cation.
