= Øyvind Burrau =

Danish scientist

Øyvind Burrau (or Øjvind Burrau), born 24 March 1896 in Copenhagen, died 31 March 1979, was a Danish scientist who is best known for his early quantum mechanical description of the dihydrogen cation which he made while at the Niels Bohr Institute.

Burrau worked as a geodesist at the Geodætisk Institut from 1928 to 1963.
