= Kwong-Tin Tang =

- Occupations: Engineer, academic and researcher
- Awards: Senior Distinguished U.S. Scientist Award, Alexander von Humboldt-Stiftung; Fellow, American Physical Society

Academic background
- Education: Columbia University
- Thesis: Elastic and Reactive Scattering in the (H, H2) System

Kwong-Tin Tang is an engineer, academic and researcher. He is an Emeritus Professor of Physics at the Pacific Lutheran University, Tacoma.

Tang's research interests include interatomic interactions and atomic and molecular collisions. He has authored and coauthored over 150 papers including a monograph Asymptotic Methods in Quantum Mechanics and also a set of three volumes of Mathematical Methods for Engineers and Scientists.

Tang is a Fellow of the American Physical Society and has served as the chair of the Physics Department on three different occasions.

== Education ==
Tang completed his bachelor's degree in Engineering Physics from the University of Washington in 1958 and his M.A. in mathematics from the same university in 1959. He received his Ph.D. in physics in 1965 with his Dissertation titled "Elastic and Reactive Scattering in the (H, H2) System" from Columbia University.

== Career ==
Tang Pacific Lutheran University in 1967 as an Assistant Professor and became an associate professor in 1969. After this appointment ended in 1972, he became a Full Professor of Physics and later gained the status of Emeritus Professor.

== Research ==
=== Interatomic interactions ===
Tang presented new combining rules for the calculation of van der Waals parameters in a study. This resulted in the determination of effective Born-Mayer repulsive potential parameters through model potential of Tang and Toennies for the possible calculations of accurate potential curves for all combinations of rare gas atoms. The same model was modified to predict the potentials for ion-atom systems. New ab initio calculations were made for Na+–Ar for comparison with the new model and the results indicate excellent agreement with the model predictions. In another paper, he discussed a simple theoretical model for the van der Waals potential at intermediate distances. The outcomes indicate that for the first time, the model describes the repulsive potential of energies go up to about 10 meV. There is also a brief discussion of possible physical implications of the model potential. With the help of Tang-Toennies potential model, the anisotropic potentials of He–N2, Ne–N2, and Ar–N2 are predicted with findings showing that the law of corresponding states for anisotropic systems, that predict the reduced shapes of the potentials for a given geometrical configuration are identical and applies to the highly anisotropic rare gas- N2 systems. His study about potentials for some rare gas and alkali-helium systems calculated using the surface integral method resulted in curves that correspond with the experimental and the ab initio theoretical data.

=== Solid state physics ===
Tang evaluated multipolar matrix elements using simple wave functions based on asymptomatic behavior and binding energies of the valence electron. When compared with the low order quantities that have been previously determined, it was shown that the approach is able to produce useful values for these quantities. A variety of formulas for van der Waals coefficients were generated in a study that employed a simple two-point Padé approximant of the dynamic polarizability and it was shown that while some values actually give accurate results, others are bounds of the actual value.

=== Atomic and molecular collisions ===
In a study, Tang found that the exact quantum mechanical wavefunction for the idealized reactive atom-diatomic molecule collision model, is the same as the exact semiclassical wavefunction. At low energies, it is considered as a remarkable approximation gained through truncating the series after the first two terms, which agrees with a semiclassical wavefunction formed after two manifolds of classical trajectories. The reactive scattering in the (H, H2) system make up the quantum-mechanical study, in which the results of its treatment are in accordance with the classical treatment and the differential cross-sections are clearly backward peaked at low energies and move forward as the energy increases. There is also a discussion of the implications of present calculations for a theory of chemical kinetics. He also reformulated the close coupled differential equations for rotational excitation in collisions between an atom and a diatomic molecule which might be equivalent to other formulations, but much easier to compute and will provide a simpler expression for differential cross sections.

== Awards and honors ==
- 1992 - Senior Distinguished U.S. Scientist Award, Alexander von Humboldt-Stiftung
- 2001 - Faculty Excellence Award, Pacific Lutheran University
- 2006 - Fellow, American Physical Society
- 2007 - President's Medal, Pacific Lutheran University

== Bibliography ==
=== Books ===
- Asymptotic Methods in Quantum Mechanics: Application to Atoms, Molecules and Nuclei (2000) ISBN 978-3540672401
- Mathematical Methods for Engineers and Scientists 1 Complex Analysis, Determinants and Matrices (2006) ISBN 978-3540302735
- Mathematical Methods for Engineers and Scientists 2 Vector Analysis, Ordinary Differential Equations and Laplace Transforms (2007) ISBN 978-3540302681
- Mathematical Methods for Engineers and Scientists 3 Fourier Analysis, Partial Differential Equations and Variational Methods (2007) ISBN 978-3540446958

=== Selected articles ===
- Sheng, X., Toennies, J. P., & Tang, K. T. (2020). Conformal analytical potential for all the rare gas dimers over the full range of internuclear distances. Physical Review Letters, 125(25), 253402.
- Tang, K. T., & Toennies, J. P. (1984). An improved simple model for the van der Waals potential based on universal damping functions for the dispersion coefficients. The Journal of chemical physics, 80(8), 3726–3741.
- Tang, K. T., Norbeck, J. M., & Certain, P. R. (1976). Upper and lower bounds of two‐and three‐body dipole, quadrupole, and octupole van der Waals coefficients for hydrogen, noble gas, and alkali atom interactions. The Journal of Chemical Physics, 64(7), 3063–3074.
- Tang, K. T., & Toennies, J. P. (2003). The van der Waals potentials between all the rare gas atoms from He to Rn. The Journal of chemical physics, 118(11), 4976–4983.
- Tang, K. T., & Karplus, M. (1971). Quantum Theory of (H, H 2) Scattering: Approximate Treatments of Reactive Scattering. Physical Review A, 4(5), 1844.
- Tang, K.T. (1969): Dynamic Polarizabilities and van der Waals Coefficients. Physical Review 177, 108.
