= Lagrange inversion theorem =

Formula for inverting a Taylor series

In mathematical analysis, the Lagrange inversion theorem, also known as the Lagrange–Bürmann formula, gives the Taylor series expansion of the inverse function of an analytic function. Lagrange inversion is a special case of the inverse function theorem.

== Statement ==
Suppose z is defined as a function of w by an equation of the form

$$z = f(w)$$

where f is analytic at a point a and $f'(a)\neq 0.$ Then it is possible to invert or solve the equation for w, expressing it in the form $w=g(z)$ given by a power series

$$g(z) = a + \sum_{n=1}^{\infty} g_n \frac{(z - f(a))^n}{n!},$$

where

$$g_n = \lim_{w \to a} \frac{d^{n-1}}{dw^{n-1}} \left[\left( \frac{w-a}{f(w) - f(a)} \right)^n \right].$$

The theorem further states that this series has a non-zero radius of convergence, i.e., $g(z)$ represents an analytic function of z in a neighbourhood of $z= f(a).$ This is also called reversion of series.

If the assertions about analyticity are omitted, the formula is also valid for formal power series and can be generalized in various ways: It can be formulated for functions of several variables; it can be extended to provide a ready formula for F(g(z)) for any analytic function F; and it can be generalized to the case $f'(a)=0,$ where the inverse g is a multivalued function.

The theorem was proved by Lagrange and generalized by Hans Heinrich Bürmann, both in the late 18th century. There is a straightforward derivation using complex analysis and contour integration; the complex formal power series version is a consequence of knowing the formula for polynomials, so the theory of analytic functions may be applied. Actually, the machinery from analytic function theory enters only in a formal way in this proof, in that what is really needed is some property of the formal residue, and a more direct formal proof is available. In fact, the Lagrange inversion theorem has a number of additional rather different proofs, including ones using tree-counting arguments or induction.

If f is a formal power series, then the above formula does not give the coefficients of the compositional inverse series g directly in terms for the coefficients of the series f. If one can express the functions f and g in formal power series as

$$f(w) = \sum_{k=0}^\infty f_k \frac{w^k}{k!} \qquad \text{and}  \qquad  g(z) = \sum_{k=0}^\infty g_k \frac{z^k}{k!}$$

with f_{0} = 0 and f_{1} ≠ 0, then an explicit form of inverse coefficients can be given in term of Bell polynomials:

$$g_n = \frac{1}{f_1^n} \sum_{k=1}^{n-1} (-1)^k n^\overline{k} B_{n-1,k}(\hat{f}_1,\hat{f}_2,\ldots,\hat{f}_{n-k}), \quad n \geq 2,$$

where

$$\begin{align}
\hat{f}_k &= \frac{f_{k+1}}{(k+1)f_{1}}, \\
g_1 &= \frac{1}{f_{1}}, \text{ and} \\
n^{\overline{k}} &= n(n+1)\cdots (n+k-1)
\end{align}$$

is the rising factorial.

When f_{1} = 1, the last formula can be interpreted in terms of the faces of associahedra

$$g_n = \sum_{F \text{ face of } K_n} (-1)^{n-\dim F} f_F , \quad n \geq 2,$$

where $f_{F} = f_{i_{1}} \cdots f_{i_{m}}$ for each face $F = K_{i_1} \times \cdots \times K_{i_m}$ of the associahedron $K_n .$

== Example ==
For instance, the algebraic equation of degree p

$$x^p - x + z= 0$$

can be solved for x by means of the Lagrange inversion formula for the function f(x) = x − x^{p}, resulting in a formal series solution

$$x = \sum_{k=0}^\infty \binom{pk}{k} \frac{z^{(p-1)k+1} }{(p-1)k+1} .$$

By convergence tests, this series is in fact convergent for $|z| \leq (p-1)p^{-p/(p-1)},$ which is also the largest disk in which a local inverse to f can be defined.

== Applications ==
=== Lagrange–Bürmann formula ===
There is a special case of Lagrange inversion theorem that is used in combinatorics and applies when $f(w)=w/\phi(w)$ for some analytic $\phi(w)$ with $\phi(0)\ne 0.$ Take $a=0$ to obtain $f(a)=f(0)=0.$ Then for the inverse $g(z)$ (satisfying $f(g(z))\equiv z$), we have

$$\begin{align}
g(z) &= \sum_{n=1}^{\infty} \left[ \lim_{w \to 0} \frac {d^{n-1}}{dw^{n-1}} \left(\left( \frac{w}{w/\phi(w)} \right)^n \right)\right] \frac{z^n}{n!} \\
{} &= \sum_{n=1}^{\infty} \frac{1}{n} \left[\frac{1}{(n-1)!} \lim_{w \to 0} \frac{d^{n-1}}{dw^{n-1}} (\phi(w)^n) \right] z^n,
\end{align}$$

which can be written alternatively as

$$[z^n] g(z) = \frac{1}{n} [w^{n-1}] \phi(w)^n,$$

where $[w^r]$ is an operator which extracts the coefficient of $w^r$ in the Taylor series of a function of w.

A generalization of the formula is known as the Lagrange–Bürmann formula:

$$[z^n] H (g(z)) = \frac{1}{n} [w^{n-1}] (H' (w) \phi(w)^n)$$

where H is an arbitrary analytic function.

Sometimes, the derivative H′(w) can be quite complicated. A simpler version of the formula replaces H′(w) with H(w)(1 − φ′(w)/φ(w)) to get

$$[z^n] H (g(z)) = [w^n] H(w) \phi(w)^{n-1} (\phi(w) - w \phi'(w)),$$

which involves φ′(w) instead of H′(w).

=== Lambert W function ===
The Lambert W function is the function $W(z)$ that is implicitly defined by the equation

$$W(z) e^{W(z)} = z.$$

We may use the theorem to compute the Taylor series of $W(z)$ at $z=0.$ We take $f(w) = we^w$ and $a = 0.$ Recognizing that

$$\frac{d^n}{dx^n} e^{\alpha x} = \alpha^n e^{\alpha x},$$

this gives

$$\begin{align}
W(z) &= \sum_{n=1}^{\infty} \left[\lim_{w \to 0} \frac{d^{n-1}}{dw^{n-1}} e^{-nw} \right] \frac{z^n}{n!} \\
{} &= \sum_{n=1}^{\infty} (-n)^{n-1} \frac{z^n}{n!} \\
{} &= z-z^2+\frac{3}{2}z^3-\frac{8}{3}z^4+O(z^5).
\end{align}$$

The radius of convergence of this series is $e^{-1}$ (giving the principal branch of the Lambert function).

A series that converges for $|\ln(z)-1|<\sqrt{{4+\pi^2}}$ (approximately $0.0655 < z < 112.63$) can also be derived by series inversion. The function $f(z) = W(e^z) - 1$ satisfies the equation

$$1 + f(z) + \ln (1 + f(z)) = z.$$

Then $z + \ln (1 + z)$ can be expanded into a power series and inverted. This gives a series for $f(z+1) = W(e^{z+1})-1\text{:}$

$$W(e^{1+z}) = 1 + \frac{z}{2} + \frac{z^2}{16} - \frac{z^3}{192} - \frac{z^4}{3072} + \frac{13 z^5}{61440} -  O(z^6).$$

$W(x)$ can be computed by substituting $\ln x - 1$ for z in the above series. For example, substituting −1 for z gives the value of $W(1) \approx 0.567143.$

=== Binary trees ===
Consider the set $\mathcal{B}$ of unlabelled binary trees. An element of $\mathcal{B}$ is either a leaf of size zero, or a root node with two subtrees. Denote by $B_n$ the number of binary trees on $n$ nodes.

Removing the root splits a binary tree into two trees of smaller size. This yields the functional equation on the generating function $\textstyle B(z) = \sum_{n=0}^\infty B_n z^n\text{:}$

$$B(z) = 1 + z B(z)^2.$$

Letting $C(z) = B(z) - 1$, one has thus $C(z) = z (C(z)+1)^2.$ Applying the theorem with $\phi(w) = (w+1)^2$ yields

$$B_n = [z^n] C(z) = \frac{1}{n} [w^{n-1}] (w+1)^{2n} = \frac{1}{n} \binom{2n}{n-1} =  \frac{1}{n+1} \binom{2n}{n}.$$

This shows that $B_n$ is the nth Catalan number.

=== Asymptotic approximation of integrals ===
In the Laplace–Erdelyi theorem that gives the asymptotic approximation for Laplace-type integrals, the function inversion is taken as a crucial step.

== See also ==
- Faà di Bruno's formula gives coefficients of the composition of two formal power series in terms of the coefficients of those two series. Equivalently, it is a formula for the nth derivative of a composite function.
- Lagrange reversion theorem for another theorem sometimes called the inversion theorem
- Formal power series § The Lagrange inversion formula
