= International Axion Observatory =

Axion helioscope

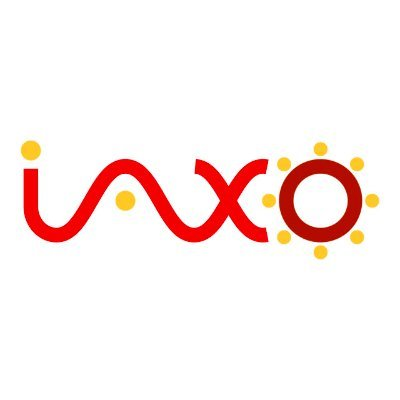
- IAXO Logo
- Predecessor: CERN Axion Solar Telescope
- Formation: July 2017 at DESY, Hamburg
- Purpose: Search for axions and other physics beyond the Standard Model
- Headquarters: DESY, Hamburg, Germany
- Fields: Astroparticle physics
- Spokesperson: Igor G. Irastorza
- Website: iaxo.desy.de iaxo_official

The International Axion Observatory (IAXO) is a next-generation axion helioscope for searching for solar axions and axion-like particles (ALPs). It is the follow-up to the CERN Axion Solar Telescope (CAST), which operated from 2003 to 2022. IAXO will be set up by implementing the helioscope concept, bringing it to a larger size and longer observation times.

== The IAXO collaboration ==
The Letter of Intent for International Axion Observatory was submitted to the CERN in August 2013. IAXO formally founded in July 2017 and received an advanced grant from the European Research Council in October 2018. The near-term goal of the collaboration is to build a precursor version of the experiment, called BabyIAXO, which will be located at DESY in Germany.

The IAXO Collaboration is formed by 21 institutes from seven countries.

== Principle of operation ==
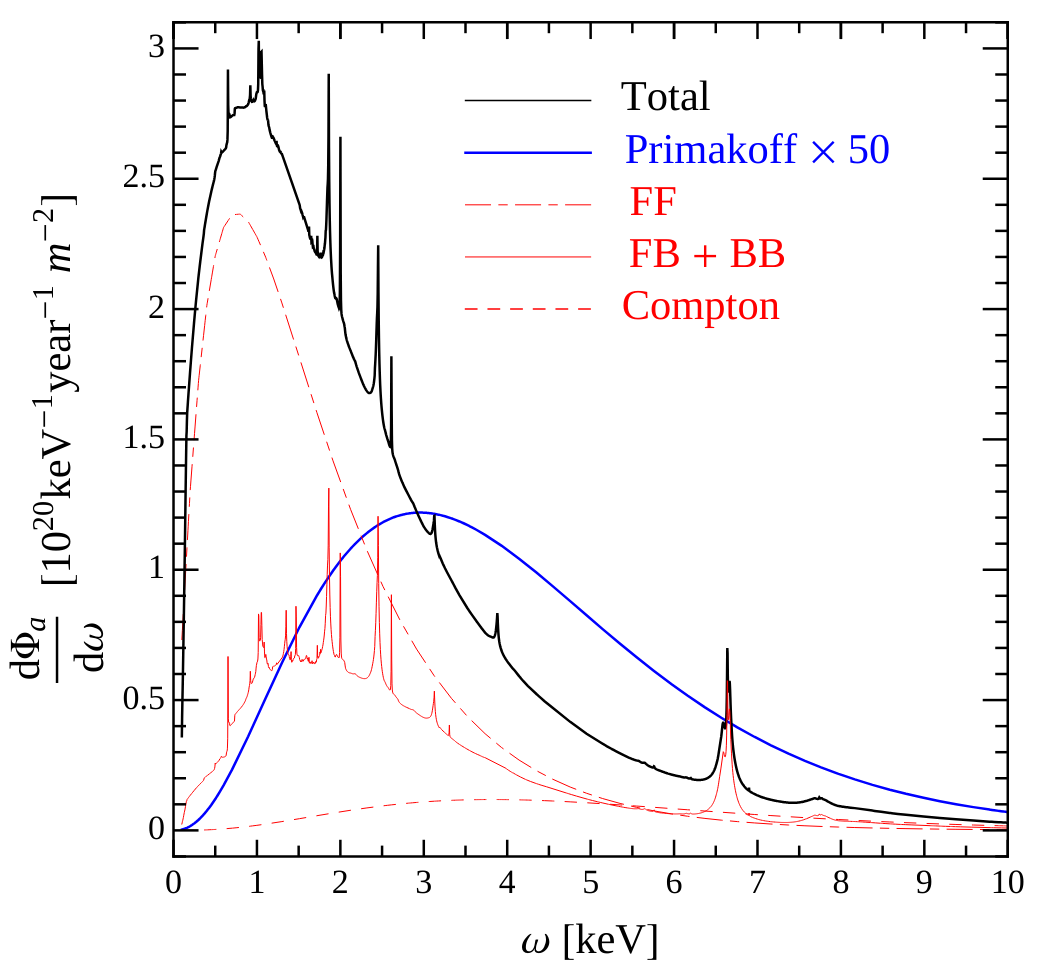
Solar axion flux due to axion-electron coupling (red) and Primakoff flux from the axion-photon coupling (blue).

The IAXO experiment is based on the helioscope principle. Axions can be produced in stars (like the Sun) via the Primakoff effect and other mechanisms. These axions would reach the helioscope and would be converted into soft X-ray photons in the presence of a magnetic field. Then, these photons travel through a focusing X-ray optics, and are expected as an excess of signal in the detector when the magnet points to the Sun.

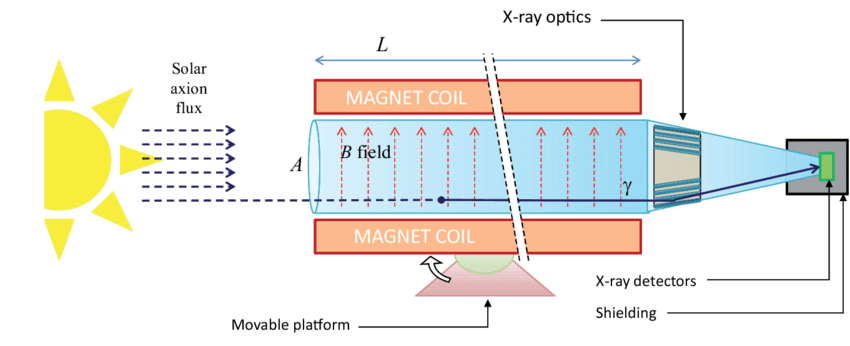
Axion heliscope's principle of operation

The potential of the experiment can be estimated by means of the figure of merit (FOM), which can be defined as $FOM \sim B^2 L^2 A \times \epsilon_{d} b^{-1/2} \times \epsilon_{o} \alpha^{-1/2} \times \epsilon^{1/2}_{t} t^{1/2}$, where the first factor is related to the magnet and depends on the magnetic field (B), the length of the magnet (L) and the area of the bore (A). The second part depends on the efficiency ($\epsilon_d$) and background (b) of the detector. The third is related to the optics, more specifically the efficiency ($\epsilon_o$) and the area of the focused signal on the detector readout ($\alpha$). The last term is related to the time (t) of operation and the fraction of time that sun is tracked ($\epsilon_t$). The objective is to maximise the value of the figure of merit in order to optimise the sensitivity of the experiment to axions.

== Sensitivity and physics potential ==
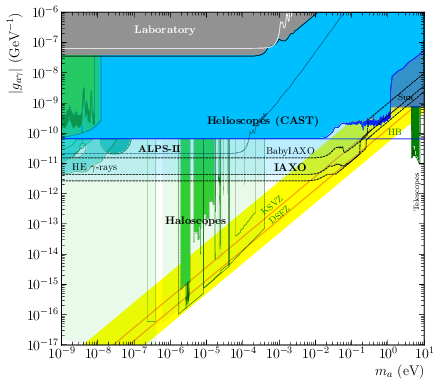
Axion-photon panorama

IAXO will primarily be searching for solar axions, along with the potential to observe the quantum chromodynamics (QCD) axion in the mass range of 1 meV to 1 eV. It is also expected to be capable of discovering ALPs. Therefore, IAXO will have the potential to solve both the strong CP problem and the dark matter problem.

It could also be later adapted to test models of hypothesised hidden photons or chameleons. Also, the magnet can be used as a haloscope to search for axion dark matter.

IAXO will have a sensitivity to the axion-photon coupling 1–1.5 orders of magnitude higher than that achieved by previous detectors.

=== Axion sources accessible to IAXO ===
Any particle found by IAXO will be at the least a sub-dominant component of the dark matter. The observatory would be capable of observing from a wide range of sources given below.

1. Solar axions.
2. QCD axions.
3. Dark matter axions.
4. Axions from astrophysical hints such as white dwarf and neutron star anomalous cooling, globular clusters, and supergiant stars powered by helium.

== IAXO: The International Axion Observatory ==
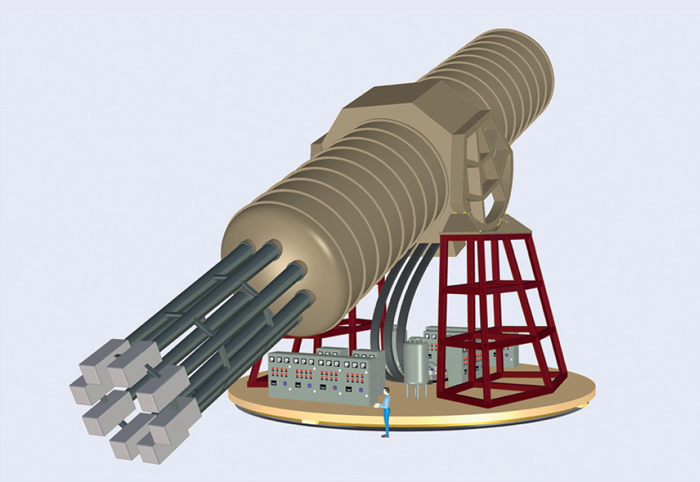
Conceptual design of the International AXion Observatory

IAXO will be a next-generation enhanced helioscope, with a signal-to-noise ratio five orders of magnitude higher compared to current-day detectors. The cross-sectional area of the magnet equipped with an X-ray focusing optics is meant to increase this signal to background ratio. When the solar axions interact with the magnetic field, some of them may convert into photons through the Primakoff effect. These photons would then be detected by the X-ray detectors of the helioscope.

The magnet will be a purpose‐built large‐scale superconductor with a length of 20 m and an average field strength of 2.5 tesla. The whole helioscope will feature eight bores of 60 cm diameter. Each of the bores will be equipped with a focusing X-ray optic and a low-background X-ray detector. The helioscope will also be equipped with a mechanical system allowing it to follow the sun consistently throughout half of the day. Tracking data will be taken during the day and background data will be taken during the night, which is the ideal split of data and background for properly estimating the event rate in each case and determining the axion signal.

== BabyIAXO ==
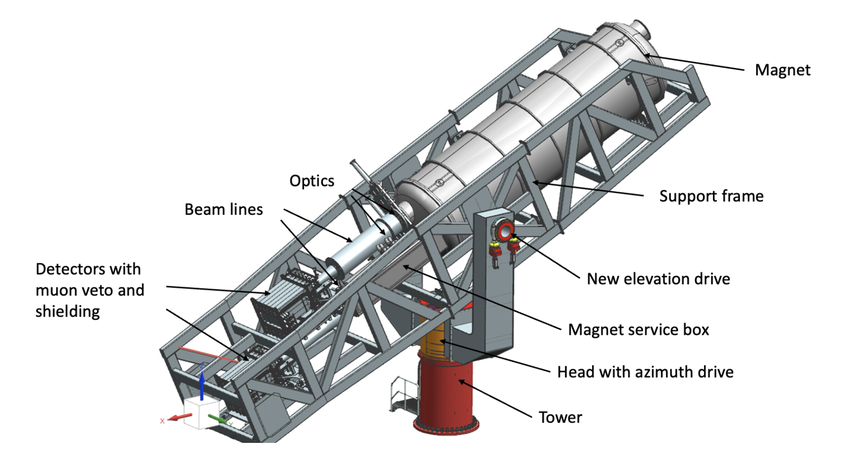
Conceptual design of BabyIAXO helioscope

BabyIAXO is an intermediate scale version of the IAXO experiment with axion discovery potential and a FOM around 100 times larger than CAST. It will also serve as a technological prototype of all the subsystems of the helioscope as a first step to explore further improvements to the final IAXO experiment.

BabyIAXO will be set up in the HERA South Hall at DESY in Hamburg, Germany, by the IAXO collaboration with the involvement of DESY and CERN. The data taking by BabyIAXO is scheduled to start in 2028.

=== BabyIAXO design ===
While the design is an ongoing process, the conceptual design of BabyIAXO was published in 2021. It will consist of a 10 m long magnet with 2 bores and 2 detection lines equipped with an X-ray optic and an ultra-low background X-ray detector each.

==== Magnet ====
The superconducting magnet has a common coil configuration in order to generate a strong magnetic field over a large volume. It will be 10 metres long consisting of two parallel racetrack coils made out of aluminium stabilised Rutherford cable. This configuration will generate a 2.5 tesla magnetic field within the two 70 cm diameter bores located between the coils.

==== X-ray optics ====
Since BabyIAXO will have two bores in the magnet, two X-ray optics are required to operate in parallel. Both of them are Wolter optics (type I). The signal from the 70 cm diameter bore will be focused to an area of 0.2 $\mathrm{cm^2}$ on the detector surface.

One of the two BabyIAXO optics will consist of two X-ray optics technologies. The inner part will be based on a mature technology developed for NASA's NuSTAR X-ray satellite. The outer part will be produced using cold slumped glass by the INAF. The focal length of this optics will be 5 m.

The second BabyIAXO optics will be one of the flight modules of the XMM-Newton space mission that belongs to the ESA. The focal length of this optics is 7.5 m.

==== Detectors ====
IAXO and BabyIAXO will have multiple and diverse detectors working in parallel, mounted to the different magnet bores. Based upon the experience from CAST, the baseline detector technology will be a time projection chamber (TPC) with a MicroMegas readout. In addition, there are several other technologies under study: GridPix, metallic magnetic calorimeters (MMC), silicon drift detectors (SDD) and transition-edge sensors (TES).

The detectors for this experiment need to meet certain technical requirements. They need a high detection efficiency in the region of interest (ROI) (1 – 10 keV) where the Primakoff axion signal is expected. They also need a very low radioactive background in the ROI of under $\mathrm{10^{-7} counts\,keV^{-1} cm ^{-2} s ^{-1} }$ (less than 3 counts per year of data). To reach this background level, the detector relies on:

1. The use of passive shielding to block environmental gammas, typically lead.
2. The use of active shielding to tag cosmic ray induced events, consisting of plastic scintillators with light sensors.
3. The intrinsic radiopurity of the construction materials, like ultra-pure copper, Kapton or Teflon.
4. The advanced event discrimination strategies based on topological information, validated with simulations.

== See also ==
- CERN Axion Solar Telescope
