= Supergranulation =

Convective pattern on the Sun's surface

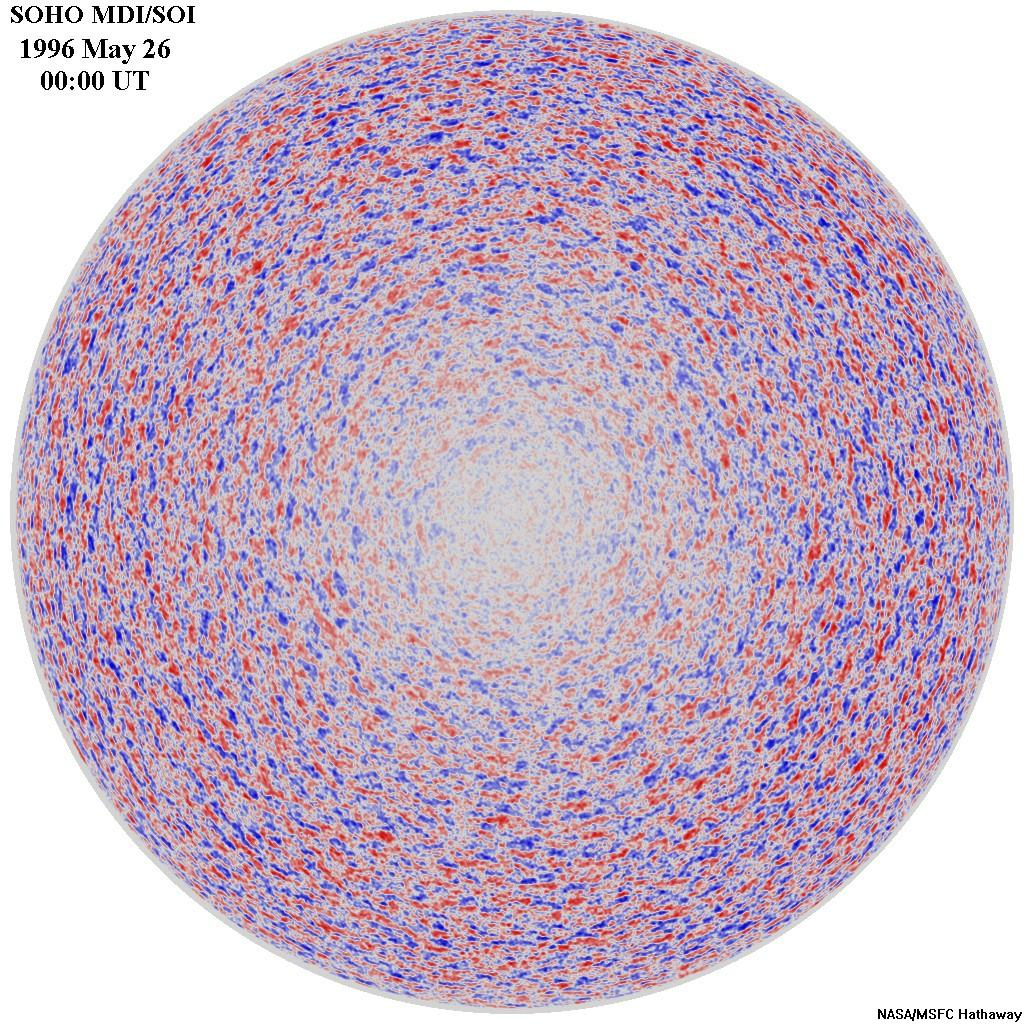
Supegranulation in the chromosphere of Sun.

In solar physics and observation, supergranulation is a pattern of convection cells in the Sun's photosphere. The individual convection cells are typically referred to as supergranules. The pattern was discovered in the 1950s by A.B. Hart using Doppler velocity measurements showing horizontal flows on the photosphere (flow speed about 300 to 500 m/s, a tenth of that in the smaller granules). Later work (1960s) by Leighton, Noyes and Simon established a typical size of about 30000 km for supergranules with a lifetime of about 24 hours.

== Origin ==
Supergranulation has long been interpreted as a specific convection scale, but its origin is not precisely known. Although the presence of granules in the solar photosphere is a well-documented phenomenon, there is still much debate on the true nature or even the existence of higher-order granulation patterns. Some authors suggest the existence of three distinct scales of organization: granulation (with typical diameters of 150–2500 km), mesogranulation (5000–10000 km) and supergranulation (over 20000 km). Granules are typically considered as being signs of convective cells forming a hierarchic structure: supergranules would be thus fragmented in their uppermost layers into smaller mesogranules, which in turn would split into even smaller granules at their surface. The solar material would flow downward in dark "lanes" separating granules with the divisions between supergranules being the biggest concentrations of cold gas, analogous to rivers connecting smaller tributaries. It should however be stressed that this picture is highly speculative and might turn out to be false in the light of future discoveries. Recent studies show some evidence that mesogranulation was a ghost feature caused by averaging procedures.

== See also ==
- Dopplergram
