= Dopplergraph =

A dopplergraph or dopplergram is a two-dimensional representation of the approaching and receding motions of an object or area. The word "dopplergraph" is a combination of the words doppler and photograph. Dopplergraphs are two-dimensional records of variations in the doppler shift in light intensity.

Dopplergraphs do not need to be a record of the shift of visible light, but of any radiated wave, which includes electromagnetic waves and acoustic waves.

Because the doppler shift is caused by the velocity of the radiating source towards or away from the viewer, a dopplergraph is a picture of the velocities associated with the sources being viewed.

== See also ==
- Spectrogram
- Spectroheliograph
- Spectrohelioscope
- Solar Dynamics Observatory
