= Henry Primakoff =

Ukrainian-American physicist (1914–1983)

- Генри Хаимович Примако́в
- Born: February 12, 1914; Odesa, Russian Empire
- Died: February 25, 1983 (aged 69); Philadelphia, United States
- Education: Columbia University (AB, AM); New York University (PhD)
- Known for: Primakoff effect Holstein–Primakoff transformation
- Spouse: Mildred Cohn
- Awards: Guggenheim Fellowship (1966)
- Scientific career
- Workplaces: Polytechnic Institute of Brooklyn (1938-1940); Queens College, New York (1940-1942); Columbia University (1942-1945); New York University (1945-1946); Washington University in St. Louis (1946-1960); University of Pennsylvania (1960-1983)

Henry Primakoff (Ukrainian: Генрі Примако́в; February 12, 1914 – July 25, 1983) was an American theoretical physicist who is famous for his discovery of the Primakoff effect.

Primakoff contributed to the understanding of weak interactions, double beta decay, spin waves in ferromagnetism, and the interaction between neutrinos and the atomic nucleus. Along with Theodore Holstein, Primakoff also developed the Holstein–Primakoff transformation which is designed to treat spin waves as bosonic excitations.

== Life ==
Henry Primakoff was born in 1914 in Odesa, Russian Empire, into a Jewish family. His father Chaim Primakov (a pharmacist) and his mother Maryem Primakova (nee Katz) were married in the office of the Municipal Rabbi of Odesa on June 30, 1913. His mother and his grandparents decided to escape from Russia to the United States, through Romania and later Germany, where they finally took a steamship. They settled in New York City in 1922

Primakoff graduated from Columbia University in 1936, and obtained his PhD in physics from New York University in 1938.

During his university studies he met the biochemist Mildred Cohn, who he married in 1938.

In 1940 he worked at the Polytechnic Institute of Brooklyn, subsequently at the Queens College, and then at Washington University in St. Louis starting in 1946.

During World War II, J. Robert Oppenheimer tried to convince him to join the Manhattan Project, but Primakoff declined due the short time to make the atomic bomb.

Primakoff was the first Donner Professor of Physics in the University of Pennsylvania in 1960.

Primakoff died of cancer in 1983 in Philadelphia, United States.

== Fellowships, awards and honors ==
In 1968 he was elected a member of the U.S. National Academy of Sciences.

In 2011 the American Physical Society established the Henry Primakoff Award for Early-Career Particle Physics.
