= CERN Axion Solar Telescope =

Experiment in astroparticle physics, sited at CERN in Switzerland

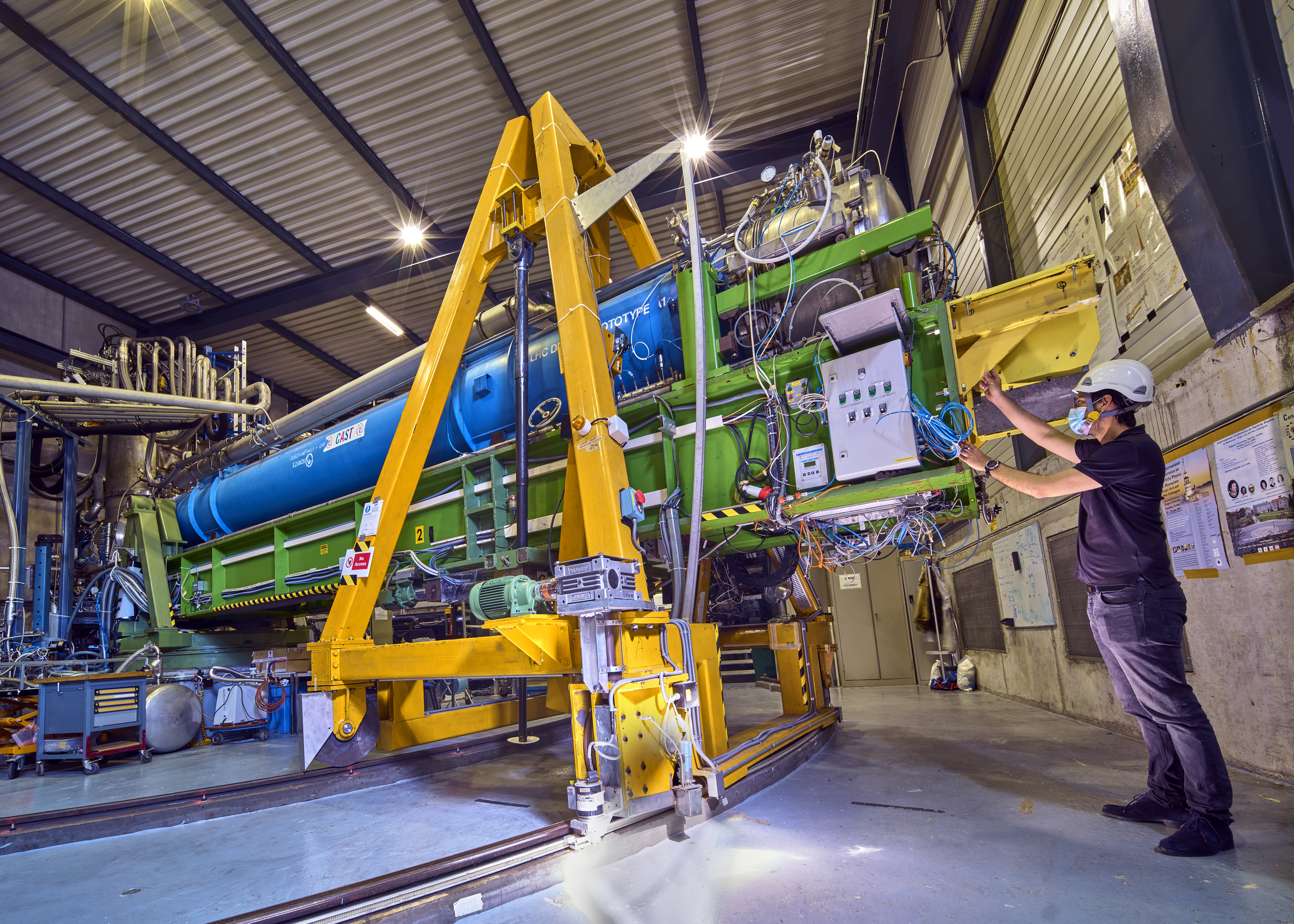
- RADES detector at CAST
- Successor: International Axion Observatory
- Formation: Approved on 13 April 2000
- Legal status: Taking data since 18 June 2003
- Purpose: Search for dark matter and energy
- Headquarters: Geneva, Switzerland
- Fields: Astroparticle physics
- Spokesperson: Konstantin Zioutas
- Website: cast.web.cern.ch/CAST/

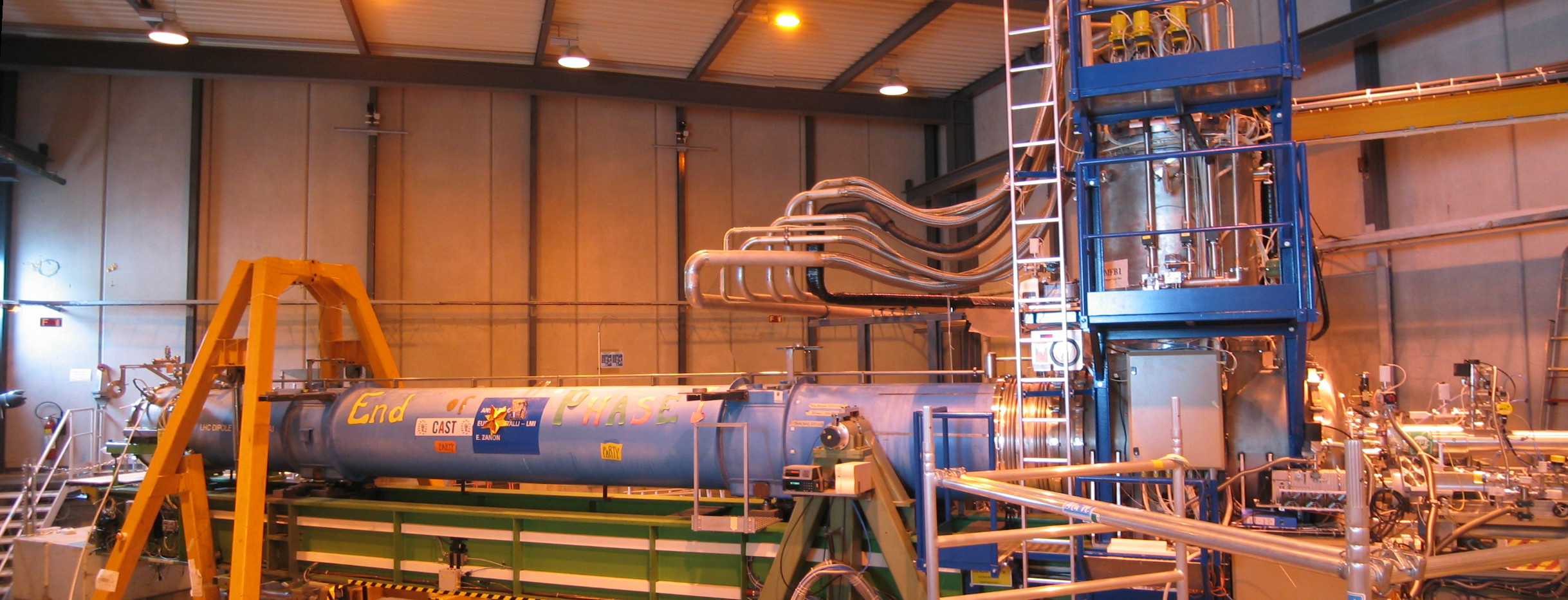
CAST. The telescope magnet (blue) pivots about the right-hand side, while the yellow gantry on the left of the picture rolls along a circular track in the floor and raises and lowers the left-hand side to track the sun.

The CERN Axion Solar Telescope (CAST) is an experiment in astroparticle physics to search for axions originating from the Sun. The experiment, sited at CERN in Switzerland, was commissioned in 1999 and came online in 2002 with the first data-taking run starting in May 2003. The successful detection of solar axions would constitute a major discovery in particle physics, and would also open up a brand new window on the astrophysics of the solar core.

CAST is currently the most sensitive axion helioscope.

== Theory and operation ==
If the axions exist, they may be produced in the Sun's core when X-rays scatter off electrons and protons in the presence of strong electric fields. The experimental setup is built around a 9.26 m long decommissioned test magnet for the LHC capable of producing a field of up to 9.5 T. This strong magnetic field is expected to convert solar axions back into X-rays for subsequent detection by X-ray detectors. The telescope observes the Sun for about 1.5 hours at sunrise and another 1.5 hours at sunset each day. The remaining 21 hours, with the instrument pointing away from the Sun, are spent measuring background axion levels.

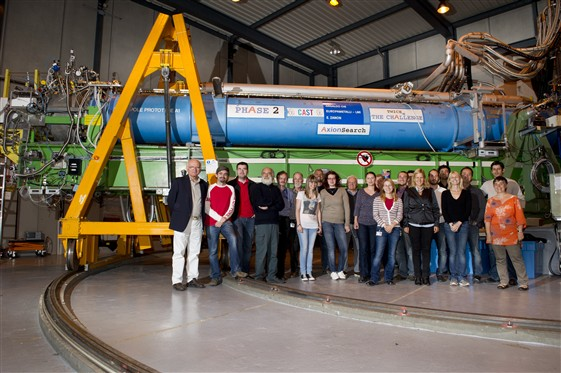
Members of the CAST Collaboration, 2011

CAST began operation in 2003 searching for axions up to 0.02 eV. In 2005, Helium-4 was added to the magnet, extending sensitivity to masses up to 0.39 eV, then Helium-3 was used during 2008–2011 for masses up to 1.15 eV. CAST then ran with vacuum again searching for axions below 0.02 eV.

As of 2014, CAST has not turned up definitive evidence for solar axions. It has considerably narrowed down the range of parameters where these elusive particles may exist. CAST has set significant limits on axion coupling to electrons and photons.

A 2017 paper using data from the 2013–2015 run reported a new best limit on axion-photon coupling of 0.66×10^{−10} / GeV.

Built upon the experience of CAST, a much larger, new-generation, axion helioscope, the International Axion Observatory (IAXO), has been proposed and is now under preparation.

== Detectors ==
The CAST focuses on the solar axions using a helioscope, which is a 9.2 m superconducting LHC prototype dipole magnet. The superconductive magnet is maintained by constantly keeping it at 1.8 Kelvin using superfluid helium. There are two magnetic bores of 43 mm diameter and 9.2 6m length with X-ray detectors placed at all ends. These detectors are sensitive to photons from inverse Primakoff conversion of solar axions. The two X-ray telescopes of CAST measures both signal and background simultaneously with the same detector and reduces the systematic uncertainties.

From 2003 to 2013, the following three detectors were attached to ends of the dipole magnet, all based on the inverse Primakoff effect, to detect the photons converted from the solar axions.

1. Conventional time projection chamber detectors (TPC).
2. MICROMEsh GAseous Structure detectors (MICROMEGAS).
3. X-ray telescope with a charged couple device (CCD).

After 2013 several new detectors such as the RADES, GridPix, and KWISP were installed, with modified goals and newly enhanced technologies.

=== Conventional time projection chamber detectors (TPC) ===
TPC is a gas-filled drift chambers type of detector, designed to detect the low-intensity X-ray signals at CAST. The interactions in this detector take place in a very large gaseous chamber and produce ionizing electrons. These electrons travel towards the multiwire proportional chamber (MWPC), where the signal is then amplified through the avalanche process.

=== MICROMEsh GAseous Structure detectors (MICROMEGAS) ===
This detector operated during the period of 2002 to 2004. It is a gaseous detector and was primarily employed for to detect X-rays in the energy range of 1–10 KeV. The detector itself was made up of low radioactive materials. The choice of material was mainly based on reducing the background noise, and Micromegas achieved a significantly low background rejection of 6×10^{−7} counts·keV^{−1}·cm^{−2}·s^{−1} without any shielding.

=== X-ray telescope with a charged couple device (CCD) ===
This detector has a pn-CCD chip located at the focal plane of the X-ray telescope. The X-ray telescope is based on the popular Wolter-I mirror optics concept. This technique is widely used in almost all X-ray astronomy telescopes. Its mirror is made up of 27 gold-coated nickel shells. These parabolic and hyperbolic shells are confocally arranged to optimize the resolution. The largest shell is 163 mm in diameter, while the smallest is 76 mm. The overall mirror system has a focal length of 1.6 m. This detector achieved a remarkably good signal to noise ratio by focusing the axions created inside the magnetic field chamber onto small, about few $mm^2$ area.

=== GridPix detector ===
In 2016, The GridPix detector was installed to detect the soft X-rays (energy range of 200 eV to 10 KeV) generated by solar chameleons through the primakoff effect. During the search period of 2014 to 2015 the detected signal-to-noise ratio was below the required levels.

=== InGrid Based X-ray detector ===
The sole aim of this detector is to enhance the sensitivity of CAST to energy thresholds around 1 KeV range. This is an improved sensitive detector set up in 2014 behind the X-ray telescope, for the search of solar chameleons which have low threshold energies. The InGrid detector and its granular Timepix pad readout with low energy threshold of 0.1 KeV for photon detection hunts the solar chameleons in this range.

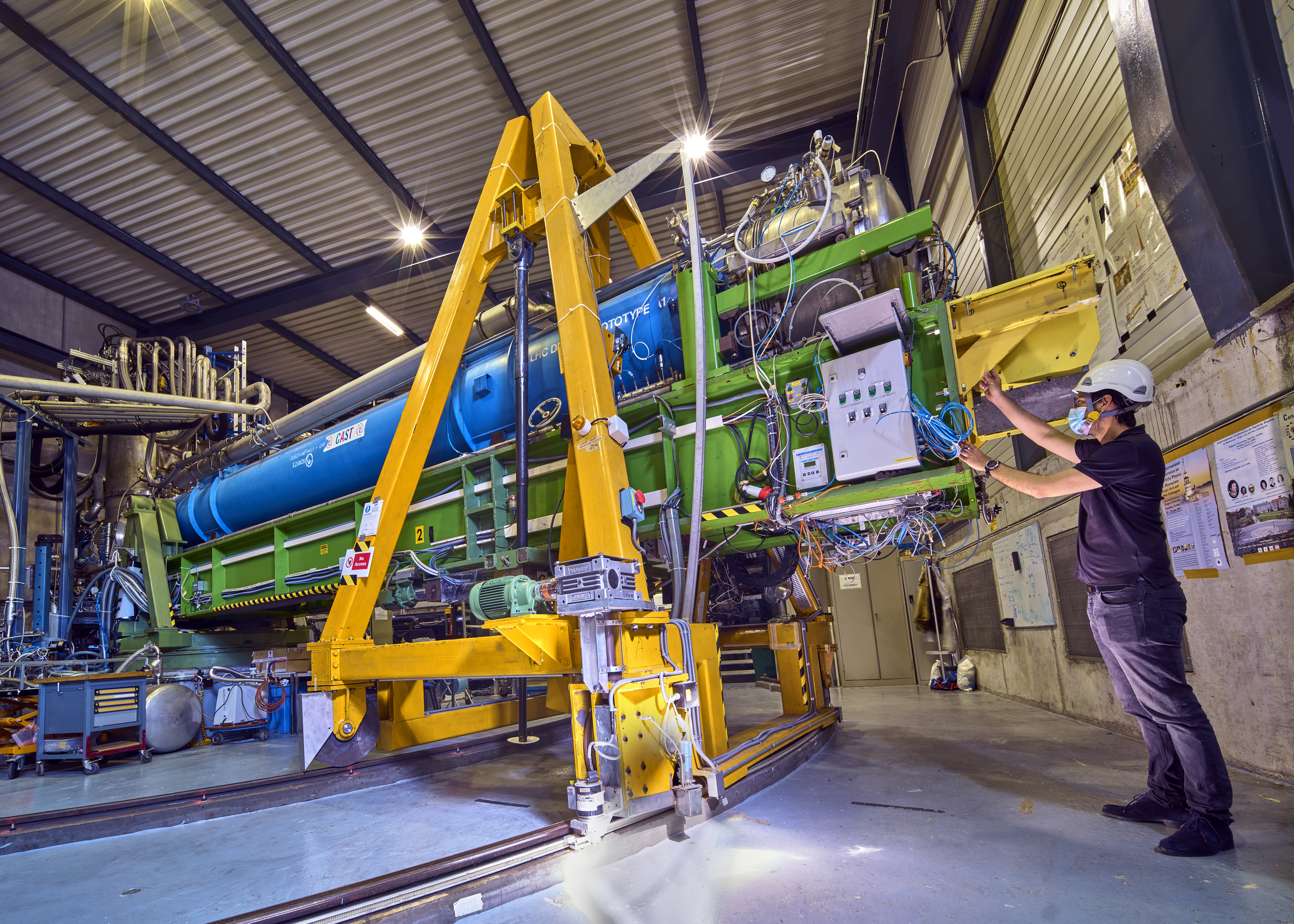
A CAST experiment member working at the RADES detector

=== Relic Axion Dark Matter Exploratory Setup (RADES) ===
The RADES started searching for axion-like dark matter in 2018, and the first results from this detector were published in early 2021. Although no significant axion signal was detected above the noise background during the 2018 to 2021 period, RADES became the first detector to search for axions above $30 \mu eV$. CAST helioscope (looks at sun) was made a haloscope (looks at galactic halo) in late 2017. RADES detector attached to this haloscope has a 1 m long alternating-irises stainless-steel cavity able to search for dark matter axions around $34 \mu eV$. Further prospects of improving the detector system with enhancements such as superconductive cavities and ferro-magnetic tunings are being looked into.

=== KWISP detector ===
KWISP at CAST is designed to detect the coupling of solar chameleons with matter particles. It uses a very sensitive optomechanical force sensor, capable of detecting a displacement in a thin membrane caused by the mechanical effects from the solar chameleon interactions.

=== CAST-CAPP ===
This detector has a delicate tuning mechanism, made of 2 parallel sapphire plates and activated by a piezoelectric motor. The maximum tuning corresponds to axions masses between 21–23 μeV. CAST-CAPP detector is also sensitive to dark matter axion tidal or cosmological streams and to the theorized axion mini-clusters. A newer and better version of CAPP is being developed at CAPP, South Korea.

== Results ==
The CAST experiment began with the goal of devising new methods and implementing novel technologies for the detection of solar axions. Owing to the inter-disciplinary and interrelated field of axion studies, dark matter, dark energy, and axion-like exotic particles, the new collaborations at CAST have broadened their research into the wide field of astroparticle physics. Results from these different domains are described below.

=== Constraints on axions ===
During the initial years, axion detection was the primary goal of CAST. Although the CAST experiment did not yet observe axions directly, it has constraint the search parameters. Mass and the coupling constant of an axion are primary aspects of its detectability. Over almost 20 years of the operation period, CAST has added very significant details and limitations to the properties of solar axions and axion-like particles. In the initial run period, the first three CAST detectors put an upper limit of $\mathrm{8.8 \times 10^{-11} GeV^{-1}}$ on $g_{a\gamma}$ (parameter for axion-photon coupling) with a 95% confidence limit (CL) for axion mass- $\mathrm{m_{a}\lesssim 0.02 eV}$. For axion mass range between $\mathrm{34.6771 \mu eV}$ and $\mathrm{34.6738 \mu eV}$, RADES constrained the axion-photon coupling constant $\mathrm{g_{a\gamma} \gtrsim 4 \times 10^{-13} GeV^{-1}}$ with just about 5% error. The most recent results, in 2017 set an upper limit on $g_{a\gamma}$ $\mathrm{< 0.66 \times 10^{-10} GeV^{-1}}$ (with 95% CL) for all axions with masses below 0.02 eV. CAST has thus improved the previous astrophysical limits and has probed numerous relevant axion models of sub-electron-volt mass.

=== Search for dark matter ===
CAST was able to constrain the axion-photon coupling constant from the very low up to the hot dark matter sector; and the current search range overlaps with the present cosmic hot dark matter bound which is axion mass, $m_a \lesssim 0.9 eV$. The new detectors at CAST are also looking for proposed dark matter candidates such as the solar chameleons and pharaphotons as well as the relic axions from the Big bang and Inflation. In late 2017, the CAST helioscope which originally was searching for solar axion and ALPs, was converted into haloscope to hunt for the Dark Matter wind in milky way's galactic halo while it crosses the Earth. These idea of streaming dark wind is thought to affect and cause the random and anisotropic orientation of solar flares, for which the CAST haloscope will serve as a testbed.

=== Search for dark energy ===
In the dark energy domain CAST is currently looking for signatures of a chameleon, which is hypothesized to be a particle produced when dark energy interacts with the photons. This area is currently in its beginning stages, wherein possible ways of dark energy particles coupling with normal matter are being theorized. Using the GridPix detector, the upper bound on the chameleon photon coupling constant- $\beta_{\gamma}$ was determined to be equal to $5.74 \times 10^{10}$ for $\beta_m$ (chameleon matter coupling constant) in the range of 1 to $10^{6}$. KWISP detector obtained an upper limit on the force acting on its detector membrane due to chameleons as $44\pm18$ pNewton, which corresponds to a specific exclusion zone in $\beta_{\gamma}$-$\beta_m$ plane and complements the results obtained by GridPix.
