= Mildred Cohn =

American biochemist (1913–2009)

- Born: July 12, 1913; New York City, New York, US
- Died: October 12, 2009 (aged 96); Philadelphia, Pennsylvania, US
- Education: Hunter College, Columbia University
- Spouse: Henry Primakoff
- Children: Three
- Parents: Isidore Cohn (father); Bertha Klein Cohn (mother)
- Awards: Garvan–Olin Medal (1963); Elliott Cresson Medal (1975), National Medal of Science (1982)
- Scientific career
- Fields: Physical Biochemistry
- Workplaces: National Advisory Committee for Aeronautics; University of Pennsylvania; Washington University School of Medicine
- Doctoral advisor: Harold Urey

Mildred Cohn (July 12, 1913 – October 12, 2009) was an American biochemist who furthered understanding of biochemical processes through her study of chemical reactions within animal cells. She was a pioneer in the use of nuclear magnetic resonance for studying enzyme reactions, particularly reactions of adenosine triphosphate (ATP).

She received the nation's highest science award, the National Medal of Science, in 1982, and was inducted into the National Women's Hall of Fame.

== Early life ==
Cohn's parents, childhood sweethearts Isidore Cohn and Bertha Klein Cohn, were Jewish. Her father was a rabbi. They left Russia for the United States around 1907. Mildred Cohn was born July 12, 1913, in the Bronx, where her family lived in an apartment. When Mildred was 13, her father moved the family to a Yiddish-speaking cooperative, Heim Gesellschaft, which strongly emphasized education, the arts, social justice, and the preservation of Yiddish culture.

== Education ==
Cohn graduated from high school at 14. She went on to attend Hunter College, which was both free and open to all qualified women, irrespective of race, religion or ethnic background. She received her Bachelor's cum laude in 1931. She managed to afford a single year at Columbia University, but was ineligible for an assistantship because she was a woman. After receiving her master's degree in 1932, she worked for the National Advisory Committee for Aeronautics for two years. Although she had a supportive supervisor, she was the only woman among 70 men, and was informed that she would never be promoted. She subsequently returned to Columbia, studying under Harold Urey, who had just won the Nobel Prize. Originally, Cohn was working to study the different isotopes of carbon. However, her equipment failed her, and she could not finish this project. She went on to write her dissertation on oxygen isotopes and earned her PhD in physical chemistry in 1938.

== Career ==
External videos
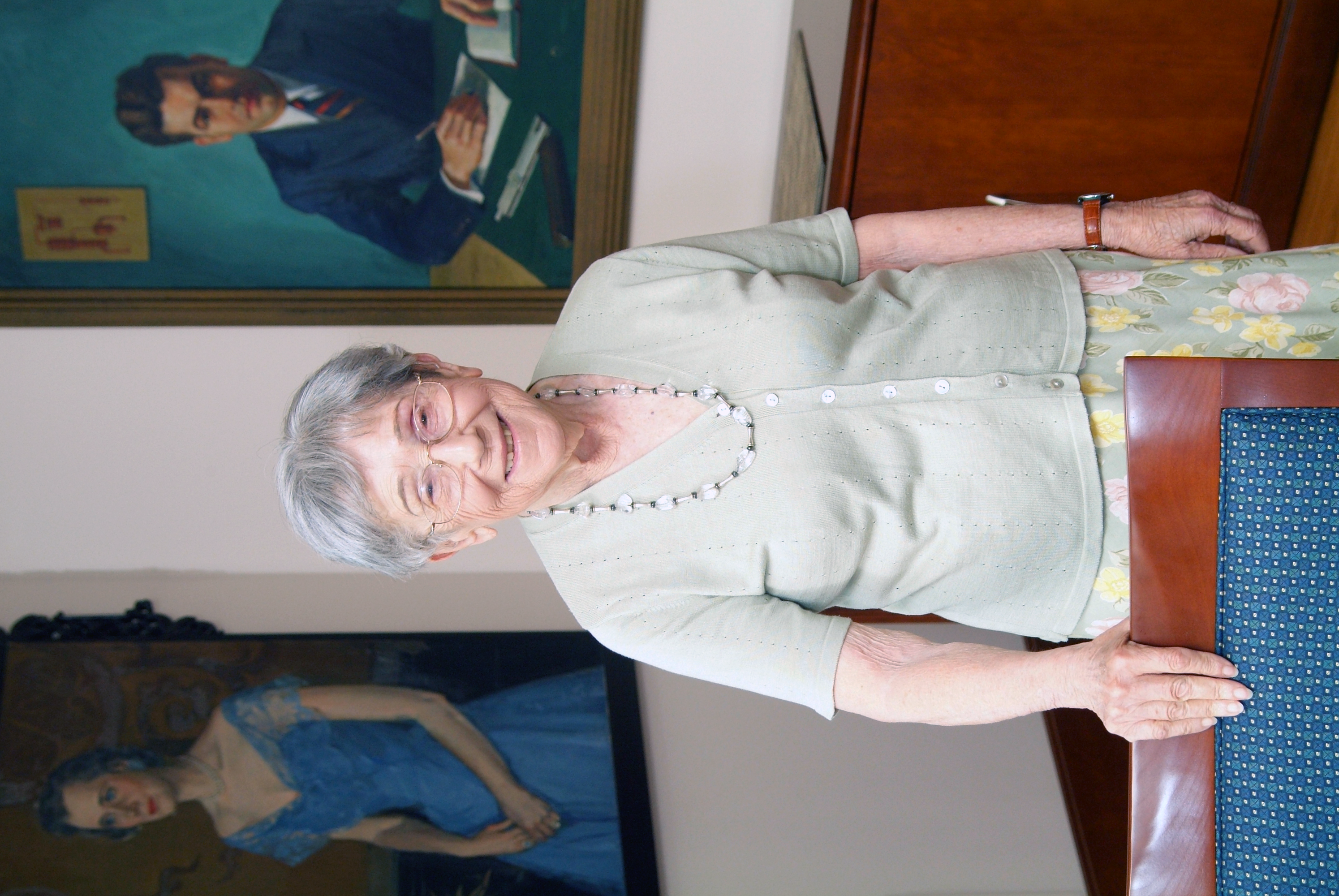
- “I didn’t intend to be an assistant for the rest of my life; so I started a new field of research”, talk given at the Science History Institute in 2005.

With Urey's recommendation, Cohn was able to obtain a position as a research associate in the laboratory of Vincent du Vigneaud at the George Washington University Medical School in Washington, D.C.. There Cohn conducted post-doctoral studies on sulfur amino acid metabolism using radioactive sulfur isotopes. Cohn pioneered the use of isotopic tracers to examine the metabolism of sulfur-containing compounds. When du Vigneaud moved his laboratory to Cornell University Medical College in New York City, Cohn and her new husband, physicist Henry Primakoff, moved to New York as well.

In 1946, Henry Primakoff was offered a faculty appointment at Washington University School of Medicine. Cohn was able to obtain a research position with Carl and Gerty Cori in their biochemistry laboratory in the university's school of medicine. There, she was able to choose her own research topics. She used nuclear magnetic resonance to investigate the reaction of phosphorus with ATP, revealing considerable information about the biochemistry of ATP, including the structure of ATP, oxidative phosphorylation and role of divalent ions in the enzymatic conversion of ATP and ADP.

When asked in later life about her most exciting moments in science, Cohn replied: "In 1958, using nuclear magnetic resonance, I saw the first three peaks of ATP. That was exciting. [I could] distinguish the three phosphorus atoms of ATP with a spectroscopic method, which had never been done before." Using a stable isotope of oxygen, Cohn discovered how phosphorylation and water are part of the electron transport system of the metabolic pathway oxidative phosphorylation, the ubiquitous process used by all aerobic organisms to generate energy, in the form of ATP, from nutrients. She elucidated how the divalent metal ions are involved in the enzymatic reactions of ADP and ATP by studying NMR spectra of the phosphorus nuclei and the structural change in the presence of various divalent ions.

In 1958, she was promoted from research associate to associate professor. In 1960, Cohn and her husband joined the University of Pennsylvania. Mildred was appointed as an associate professor of Biophysics and Physical Biochemistry, and became a full professor the following year. In 1964, she became the first woman to receive the American Heart Association's Lifetime Career Award, providing support until she reached age sixty-five. In 1971, she was elected to the National Academy of Sciences. She was elected to the American Philosophical Society the following year. In 1982, she retired from the faculty as the Benjamin Rush Professor Emerita of Physiological Chemistry. In 1984, Cohn received the Golden Plate Award of the American Academy of Achievement.

In the course of her career, Mildren Cohn worked with four Nobel laureates, who received three Nobel prizes:

- Harold Urey, Nobel Prize in Chemistry, 1934
- Carl and Gerty Cori, Nobel Prize in Physiology or Medicine, 1947
- Vincent du Vigneaud, Nobel Prize in Chemistry, 1955

== Achievements ==
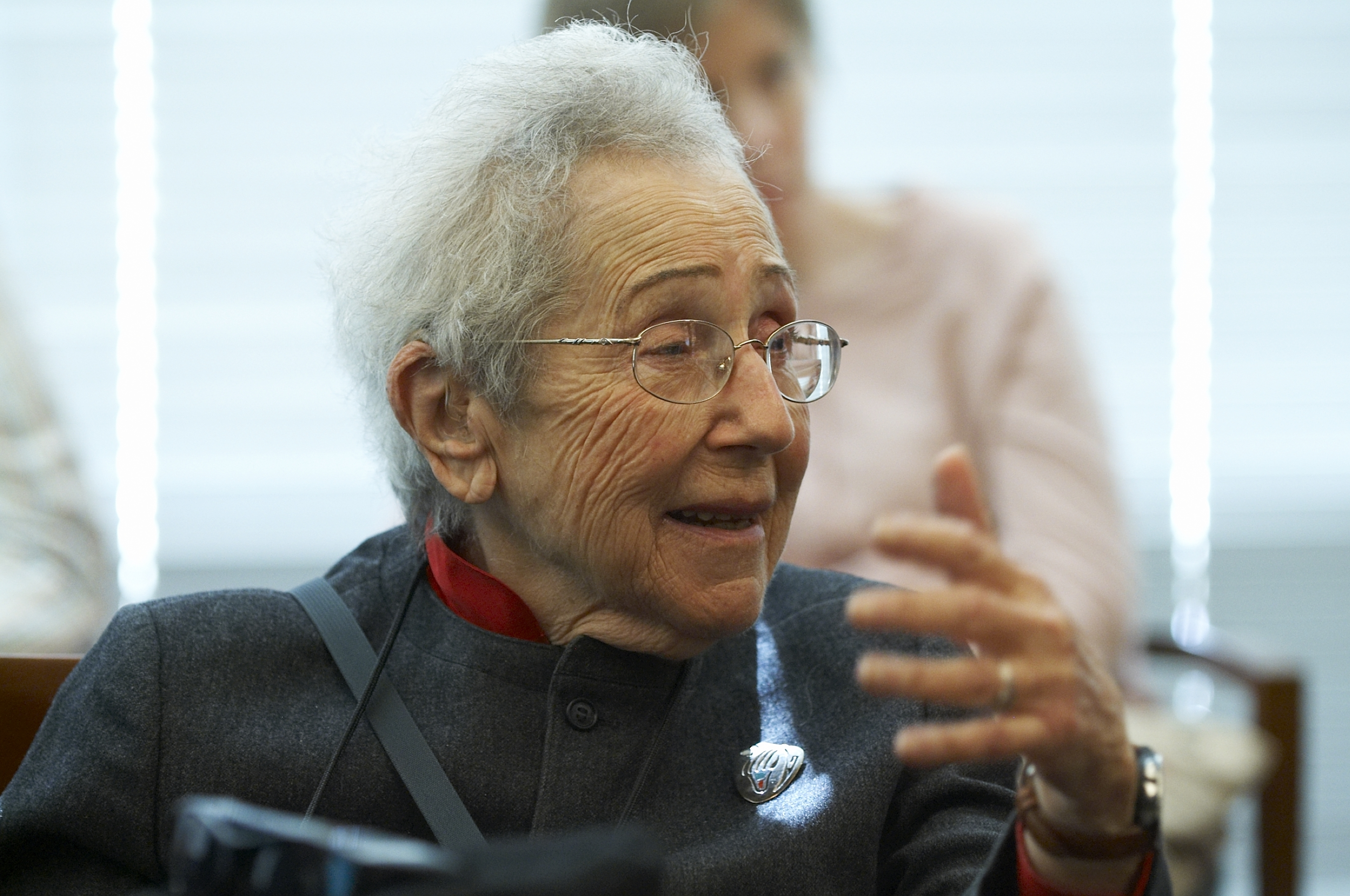
Attending the Brown Bag Lecture in 2005

Cohn wrote 160 papers, mostly on her primary research subject of using nuclear magnetic resonance to study ATP. She received 9 honorary doctorates from various universities, including the University of Pennsylvania and the Weizmann Institute.

She won the American Chemical Society's Garvan-Olin Medal in 1963. In 1968, she was elected a Fellow of the American Academy of Arts and Sciences. She was awarded the Franklin Institute's Elliott Cresson Medal in 1975, for her work on nuclear magnetic resonance analysis of enzymatic complexes. She received the International Organization of Women Biochemists Award in 1979. She received Columbia University's Chandler Medal in 1986.

She was presented with the National Medal of Science by President Ronald Reagan in 1983 for 'pioneering the use of stable isotopic tracers and nuclear magnetic resonance spectroscopy in the study of the mechanisms of enzymatic catalysis'.

During her career, Cohn achieved several gender firsts: She was the first woman to be appointed to the editorial board of the Journal of Biological Chemistry, where she served as editor from 1958–63 and from 1968–73. She was also the first woman to become president of the American Society for Biochemistry and Molecular Biology, then called the American Society of Biological Chemists (serving as such from 1978 to 1979), and the first woman career investigator for the American Heart Association. In 2009, she was inducted into the National Women's Hall of Fame in Seneca Falls, New York.

== Marriage ==
Mildred Cohn was married to physicist Henry Primakoff from 1938 until his death in 1983. They had three children, all of whom earned doctorates. Mildren Cohn is quoted in Elga Wasserman's book, The Door in the Dream: Conversations With Eminent Women in Science, as saying “My greatest piece of luck was marrying Henry Primakoff, an excellent scientist who treated me as an intellectual equal and always assumed that I should pursue a scientific career and behaved accordingly.”

== Partial bibliography ==
- Cohn, Mildred; Hughes, T. R. (1960). "Phosphorus magnetic resonance spectra of adenosine diphosphate and triphosphate. I. Effect of PH". The Journal of Biological Chemistry. 235: 3250–3. doi:10.1016/S0021-9258(20)81346-5.
- Cohn, Mildred; Hughes, T. R. (1962). "Nuclear magnetic resonance spectra of adenosine di- and triphosphate. II. Effect of complexing with divalent metal ions". The Journal of Biological Chemistry. 237: 176–81. doi:10.1016/S0021-9258(18)81382-5. PMID 13880359.
- Cohn, Mildred (1953). "A study of oxidative phosphorylation with 0-18 labeled inorganic phosphate". The Journal of Biological Chemistry. 201 (2): 735–50. doi:10.1016/S0021-9258(18)66231-3. PMID 13061412.
