= Helioscope =

Instrument for observing sun

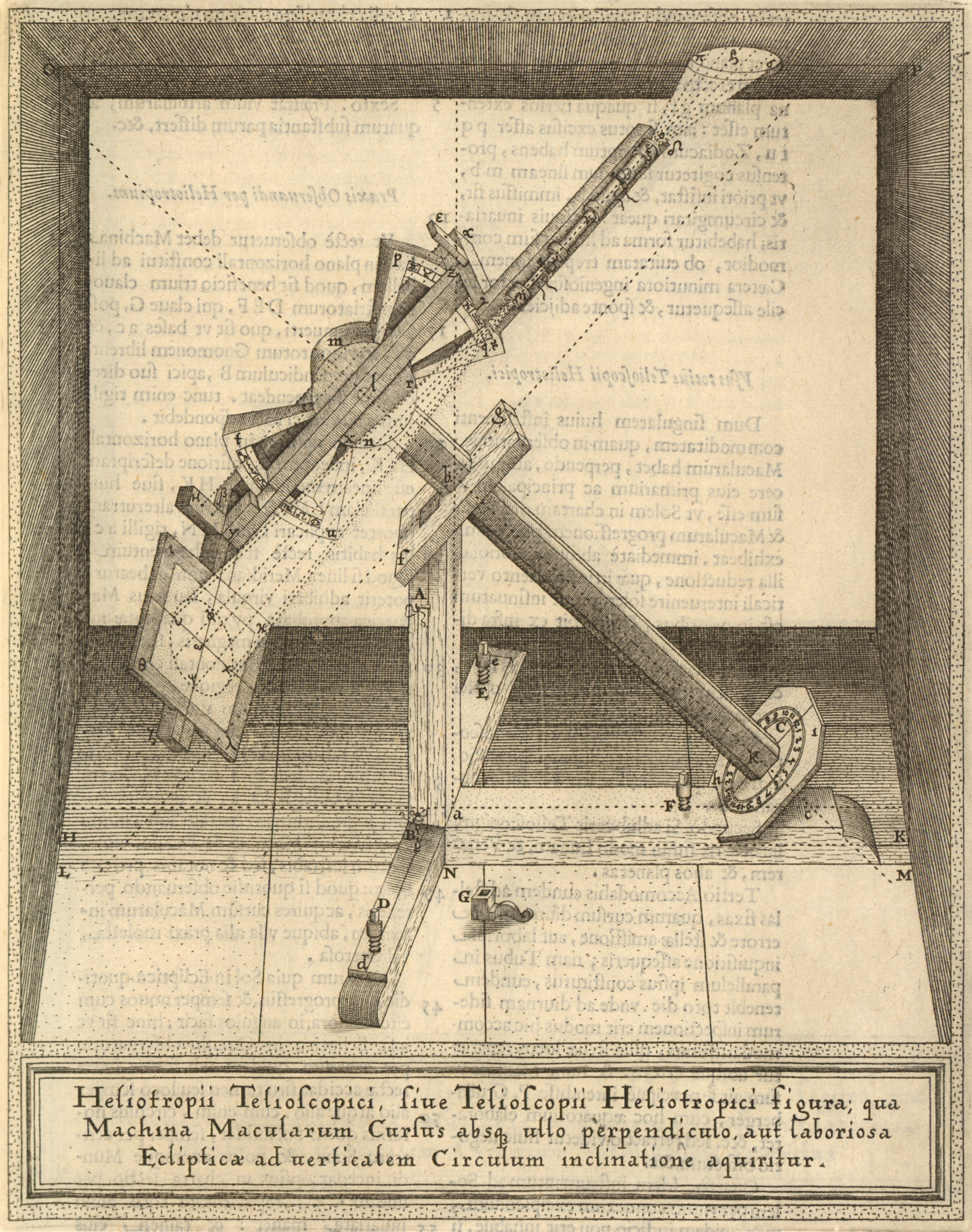
Christoph Scheiner's Helioscope

A helioscope is an instrument used in observing the Sun and sunspots. The helioscope was first used by Benedetto Castelli (1578–1643) and refined by Galileo Galilei (1564–1642). The method involves projecting an image of the sun onto a white sheet of paper suspended in a darkened room with the use of a telescope.

The first machina helioscopica or helioscope was designed by Christoph Scheiner (1575 –1650) to assist his sunspot observations.

In the context of modern astroparticle physics, the term helioscope can also refer to an experiment that seeks to observe hypothetical particles (such as the axion) produced inside the sun. Examples of such helioscope experiments searching for axions include the CERN Axion Solar Telescope and International Axion Observatory.

== See also ==
- Solar telescope
- Heliometer
- Spectroheliograph
- Spectrohelioscope
