= Solar granule =

Convection cell in the Sun's photosphere

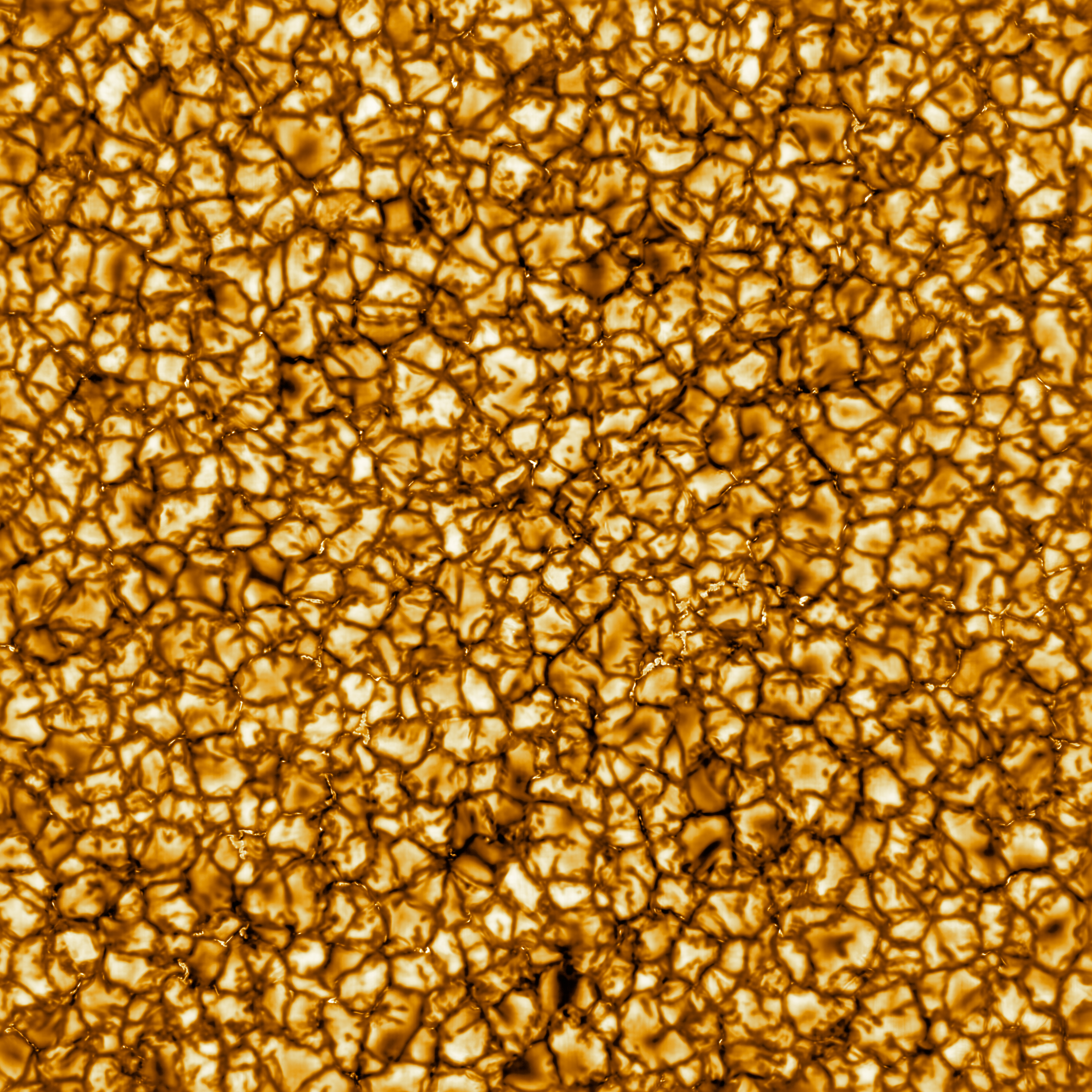
High-resolution image of the Sun's surface taken by the Daniel K. Inouye Solar Telescope (DKIST).

In solar physics and observation, granules are convection cells in the Sun's photosphere. They are caused by currents of plasma in the Sun's convective zone, directly below the photosphere. The grainy appearance of the photosphere is produced by the tops of these convective cells; this pattern is referred to as granulation.

The rising part of each granule is located in the center, where the plasma is hotter. The outer edges of the granules are darker due to cooler descending plasma. (The terms darker and cooler are strictly by comparison to the brighter, hotter plasma. According to the Stefan–Boltzmann law, luminosity increases with the fourth power of temperature, causing even a small loss of heat to produce a large luminosity contrast.) In addition to the visible appearance, which can be explained by convective motion, Doppler shift measurements of the light from individual granules provide evidence for the convective nature of the granules.

A typical granule has a diameter on the order of 1,500 kilometres (930 mi) and lasts 8 to 20 minutes before dissipating. At any one time, the Sun's surface is covered by about 4 million granules. Below the photosphere is a layer of "supergranules" up to 30,000 kilometres (19,000 mi) in diameter with lifespans of up to 24 hours.

Solar granules resemble Bénard cells, but differ in their temporary nature, which is due to disturbances in the surrounding temperature gradient.
