= Chameleon particle =

Hypothetical scalar particle that couples to matter more weakly than gravity

Chameleon
- Composition: Unknown
- Interactions: Gravity, electroweak
- Status: Hypothetical
- Mass: Variable, depending on ambient energy density
- Electric charge: 0
- Spin: 0

The chameleon is a hypothetical scalar particle that couples to matter more weakly than gravity, postulated as a dark energy candidate. Due to a non-linear self-interaction, it has a variable effective mass which is an increasing function of the ambient energy density—as a result, the range of the force mediated by the particle is predicted to be very small in regions of high density (for example on Earth, where it is less than 1 mm) but much larger in low-density intergalactic regions: out in the cosmos chameleon models permit a range of up to several thousand parsecs. As a result of this variable mass, the hypothetical fifth force mediated by the chameleon is able to evade current constraints on equivalence principle violation derived from terrestrial experiments even if it couples to matter with a strength equal or greater than that of gravity. Although this property would allow the chameleon to drive the currently observed acceleration of the universe's expansion, it also makes it very difficult to test for experimentally.

In 2021, physicists suggested that an excess reported at the dark matter detector experiment XENON1T rather than being a dark matter candidate could be a dark energy candidate: particularly, chameleon particles yet in July 2022 a new analysis by XENONnT discarded the excess.

== Hypothetical properties ==
Chameleon particles were proposed in 2003 by Justin Khoury and Amanda Weltman.

In most theories, chameleons have a mass that scales as some power of the local energy density: $m_\text{eff} \sim \rho^\alpha$, where $\alpha \simeq 1.$

Chameleons also couple to photons, allowing photons and chameleons to oscillate between each other in the presence of an external magnetic field.

Chameleons can be confined in hollow containers because their mass increases rapidly as they penetrate the container wall, causing them to reflect. One strategy to search experimentally for chameleons is to direct photons into a cavity, confining the chameleons produced, and then to switch off the light source. Chameleons would be indicated by the presence of an afterglow as they decay back into photons.

== Experimental searches ==
A number of experiments have attempted to detect chameleons along with axions.

The GammeV experiment is a search for axions, but has been used to look for chameleons too. It consists of a cylindrical chamber inserted in a 5 T magnetic field. The ends of the chamber are glass windows, allowing light from a laser to enter and afterglow to exit. GammeV set the limited coupling to photons in 2009.

CHASE (CHameleon Afterglow SEarch) results published in November 2010, improve the limits on mass by 2 orders of magnitude and 5 orders for photon coupling.

A 2014 neutron mirror measurement excluded chameleon field for values of the coupling constant $\beta > 5.8 \times 10^8$, where the effective potential of the chameleon quanta is written as $V_{\text{eff}}=V(\Phi)+e^{\beta \Phi/M'_\text{P}} \rho$, $\rho$ being the mass density of the environment, $V(\Phi)$ the chameleon potential and $M'_\text{P}$ the reduced Planck mass.

The CERN Axion Solar Telescope has been suggested as a tool for detecting chameleons.
