= Convection cell =

Cyclic flow of convection currents in a fluid

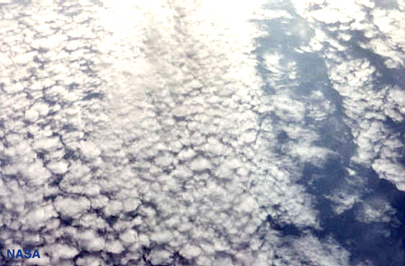
Altocumulus cloud as seen from the Space Shuttle. Altocumulus clouds are formed by convective activity.

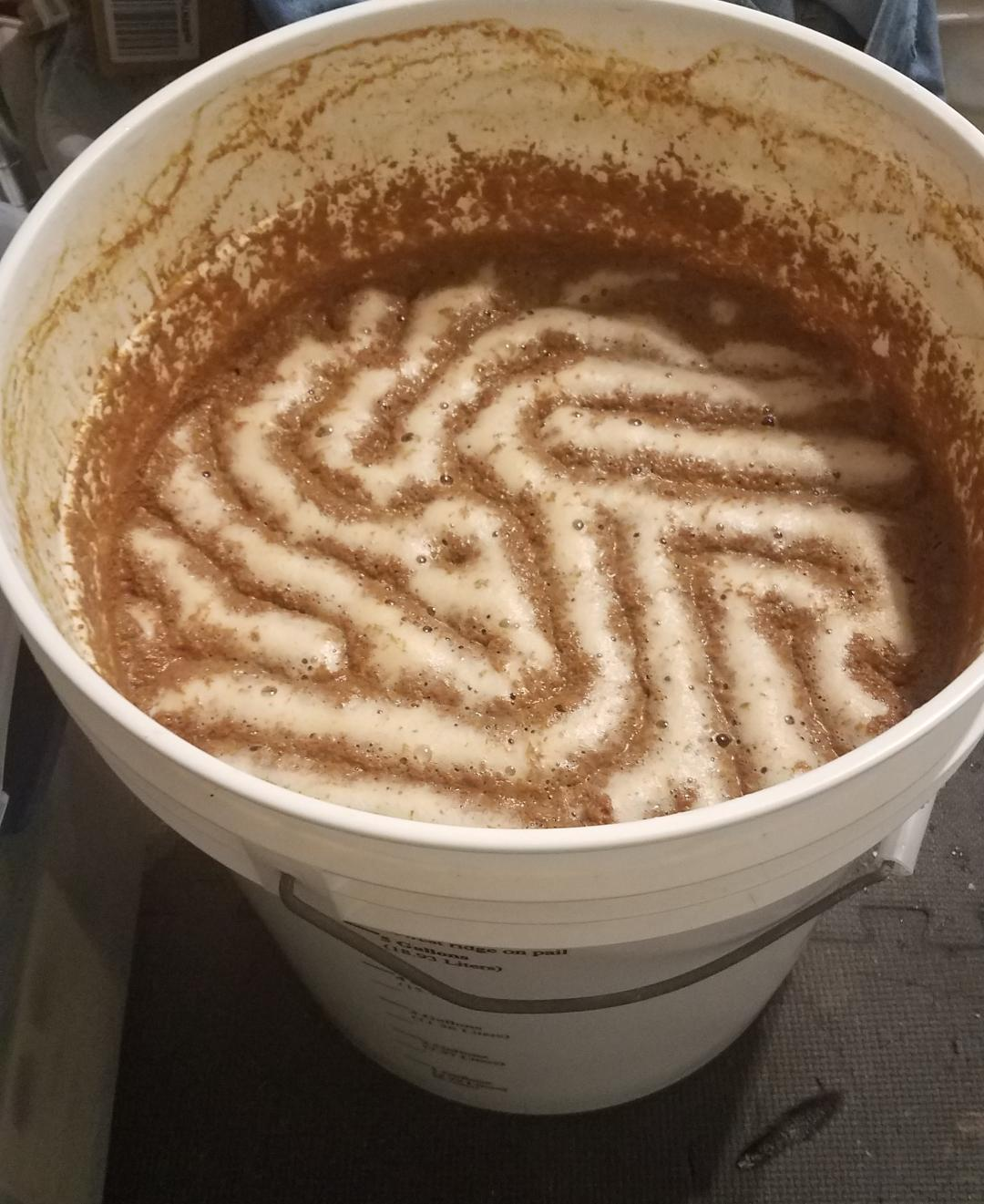
6-gallon bucket of honey wine after fermenting 10 days with cinnamon floating on top. Convection is caused by yeast releasing CO2.

In fluid dynamics, a convection cell is a circulating pattern of motion in a fluid driven by density differences, typically caused by temperature differences. As a fluid is heated, it expands, becomes less dense, and rises while cooler, denser fluid sinks, creating a self-sustaining circulation. Convection in a horizontal layer of fluid heated from below is known as Rayleigh–Bénard convection. Although convection usually depends on gravity, thermally driven convection has also been observed under microgravity conditions.

Convection cells occur in a wide variety of fluids, including the Earth's atmosphere and the Sun. In the Earth's atmosphere, they circulate air, transporting heat and moisture and contributing to cloud formation, thunderstorms, and atmospheric circulation as rising warm air cools and condenses before descending and repeating the cycle. In the Sun's photosphere, convection cells, known as granules, consist of rising hot plasma separated by cooler descending plasma.

== Process ==
A rising body of fluid typically loses heat when it encounters a cold surface when it exchanges heat with colder liquid through direct exchange, or in the example of the Earth's atmosphere, when it radiates heat. At some point, the fluid becomes denser than the fluid beneath it, which is still rising. Since it cannot descend through the rising fluid, it moves to one side. At some distance, its downward force overcomes the rising force beneath it, and the fluid begins to descend. As it descends, it warms again through surface contact or conductivity and the cycle repeats.

== Within the Earth's troposphere ==
=== Thunderstorms ===
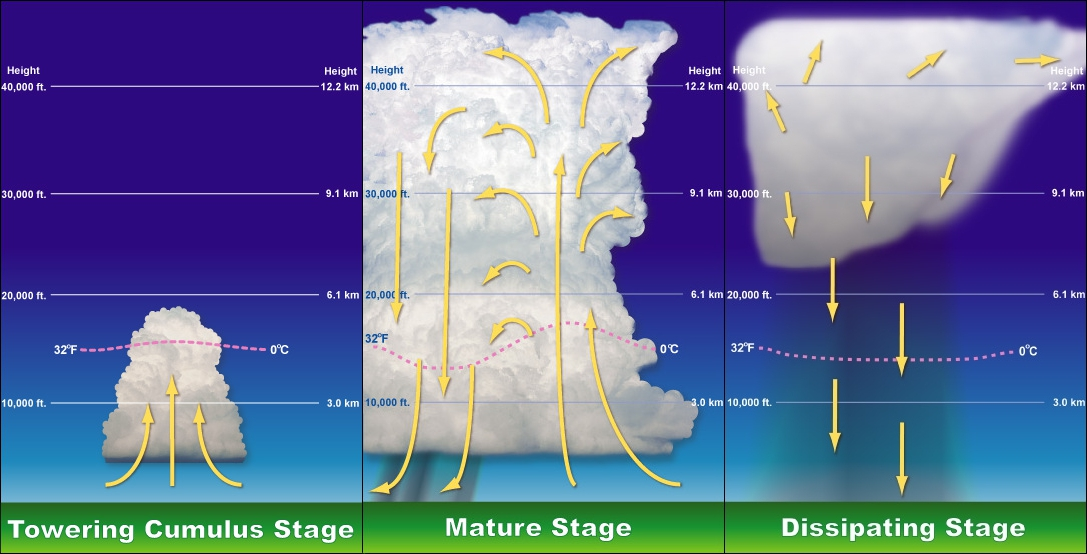
Stages of a thunderstorm's life.

Warm air has a lower density than cool air, so warm air rises within cooler air, similar to hot air balloons. Clouds form as relatively warmer air carrying moisture rises within cooler air. As the moist air rises, it cools, causing some of the water vapor in the rising packet of air to condense. When the moisture condenses, it releases energy known as the latent heat of vaporisation, which allows the rising packet of air to cool less than its surrounding air, continuing the cloud's ascension. If enough instability is present in the atmosphere, this process will continue long enough for cumulonimbus clouds to form, which support lightning and thunder. Generally, thunderstorms require three conditions to form: moisture, an unstable air mass, and a lifting force (heat).

All thunderstorms, regardless of type, go through three stages: a 'developing stage', a 'mature stage', and a 'dissipating stage'. The average thunderstorm has a 24 km (15 mi) diameter. Depending on the conditions present in the atmosphere, these three stages take an average of 30 minutes to go through.

=== Adiabatic processes ===
Heating caused by the compression of descending air is responsible for such winter phenomena as the chinook (as it is known in western North America) or the Föhn (in the Alps).

Movie of the solar photosphere observed with the Swedish 1-m Solar Telescope (SST) on La Palma, Spain. The movie shows solar granulation which is a result of convective motions of bubbles of hot gas that rise from the solar interior. When these bubbles reach the surface, the gas cools and flows down again in the darker lanes between the bright cells. In these so-called intergranular lanes, we can also see small bright points and more extended bright elongated structures. These are regions with strong magnetic fields.

== Within the Sun ==
The Sun's photosphere is composed of convection cells called granules, which are rising columns of superheated (5,800 °C) plasma averaging about 1,000 kilometres in diameter. The plasma cools as it rises and descends in the narrow spaces between the granules.
