= Spectroheliograph =

Instrument used in astronomy

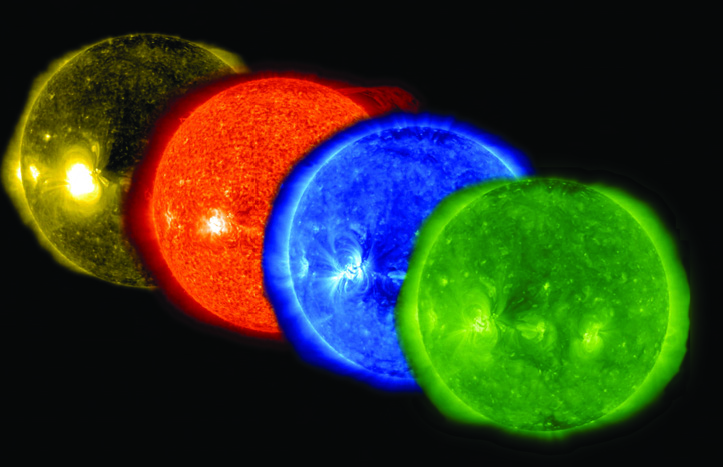
The solar disk observed in four different wavelengths of ultraviolet radiation by the Atmospheric Imaging Assembly spectroheliograph on board the Solar Dynamics Observatory. From left to right, the wavelengths imaged are 171, 304, 335, and 94 Å. Colors are false and added in postprocessing.

The spectroheliograph is an instrument used in astronomy which captures a photographic image of the Sun at a single wavelength of light, a monochromatic image. The wavelength is usually chosen to coincide with a spectral wavelength of one of the chemical elements present in the Sun.

It was developed independently by George Ellery Hale and Henri-Alexandre Deslandres in the 1890s and further refined in 1932 by Robert R. McMath to take motion pictures.

The instrument comprises a prism or diffraction grating and a narrow slit that passes a single wavelength (a monochromator). The light is focused onto a photographic medium and the slit is moved across the disk of the Sun to form a complete image.

It is now possible to make a filter that transmits a narrow band of wavelengths which produces a similar image, but spectroheliographs remain in use.

== See also ==
- Spectrohelioscope
- Helioscope
- Heliometer
