= Spectrohelioscope =

A spectrohelioscope is a type of solar telescope designed by George Ellery Hale in 1924 to allow the Sun to be viewed in a selected wavelength of light. The name comes from Latin- and Greek-based words: "Spectro," referring to the optical spectrum, "helio," referring to the Sun, and "scope," as in telescope.

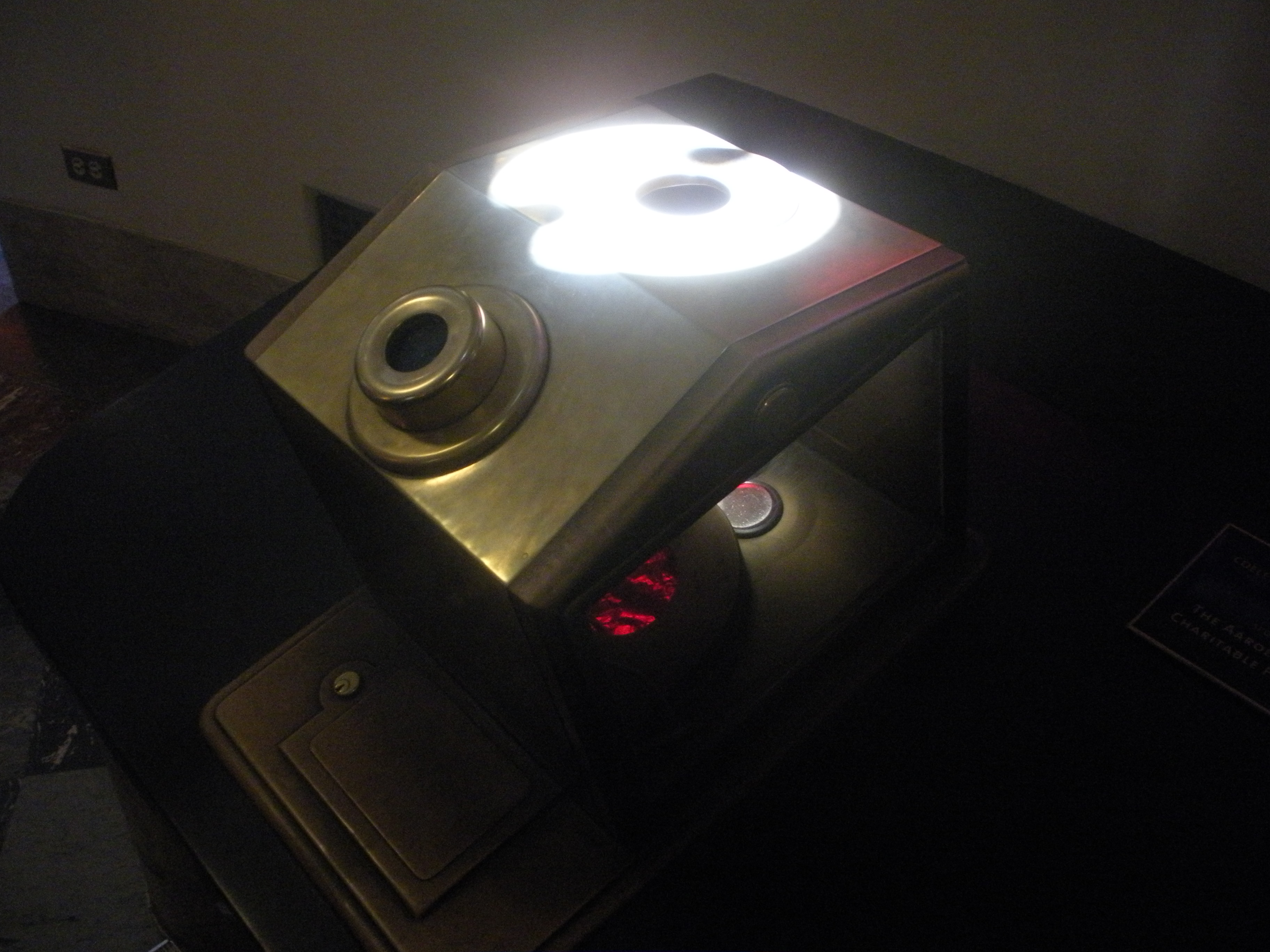
Spectrohelioscope at Griffith Observatory, tuned to H-alpha

Schematic of typical spectrohelioscope. The two slits oscillate rapidly to allow a portion of the Sun to be seen in monochromatic light. Many variations are possible: collimation can be done with concave mirrors, dispersion can be achieved with glass prisms, and scanning can be achieved with fixed slits and spinning square prisms. Because they are large (usually more than 3 meters long) and delicate, spectrohelioscopes are usually fixed, with moving mirrors to track the Sun

The basic spectrohelioscope is a complex machine that uses a spectroscope to scan the surface of the Sun. The image from the objective lens is focused on a narrow slit revealing only a thin portion of the Sun's surface. The light is then passed through a prism or diffraction grating to spread the light into a spectrum. The spectrum is then focused on another slit that allows only a narrow part of the spectrum (the desired wavelength of light for viewing) to pass. The light is finally focused on an eyepiece so the surface of the Sun can be seen. The view, however, would be only a narrow strip of the Sun's surface. The slits are moved in unison to scan across the whole surface of the Sun giving a full image. Independently nodding mirrors can be used instead of moving slits to produce the same scan: the first mirror selects a slice of the Sun, the second selects the desired wavelength.

The spectroheliograph is a similar device, but images the Sun at a particular wavelength photographically and is still in use in professional observatories.

== See also ==
- Helioscope
- Heliometer
