= Primakoff effect =

Phenomenon in particle physics

Feynman diagram representing the Primakoff effect

In particle physics, the Primakoff effect, named after Henry Primakoff, is the resonant production of neutral pseudoscalar mesons by high-energy photons interacting with an atomic nucleus. It can be viewed as the reverse process of the decay of the meson into two photons and has been used for the measurement of the decay width of neutral mesons.

It could also take place in stars and be a production mechanism of certain hypothetical particles, such as the axion. More precisely, the Primakoff effect is the conversion of axions into photons in the presence of very strong electromagnetic field.

The effect is predicted to lead to optical properties of the vacuum state in the presence of a strong magnetic field.

== See also ==
- Two-photon physics
