= List of cities, towns and villages in Flevoland =

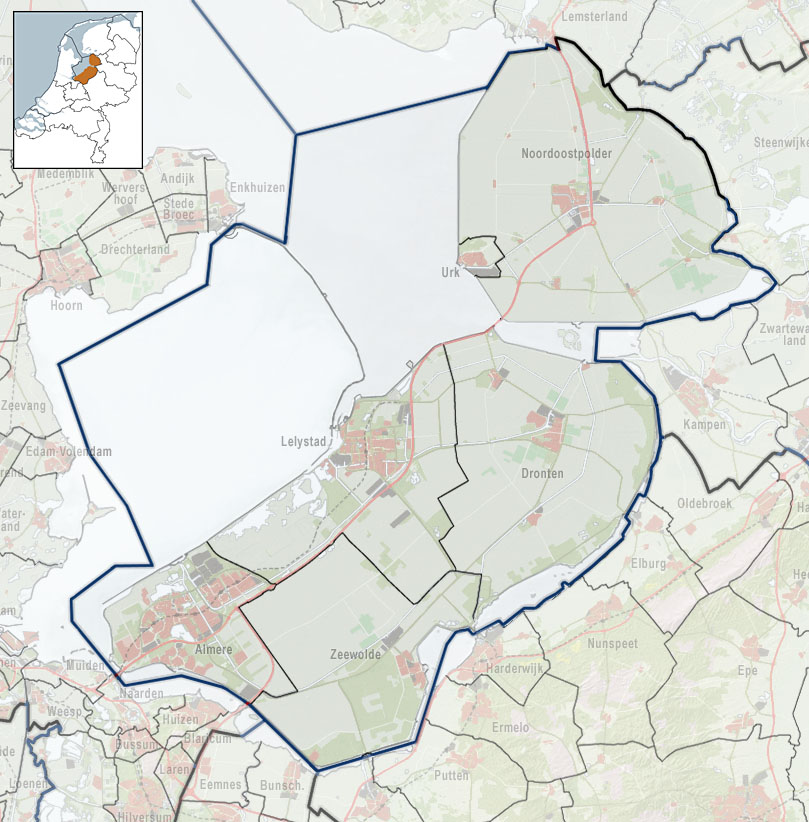
Locations of cities, towns, and villages in Flevoland

This is a list of cities, towns and villages in the province of Flevoland, in the Netherlands.

Name	Municipality	Coordinates
Almere Buiten	Almere	52°24′N 5°17′E
Almere Haven	Almere	52°20′N 5°13′E
Almere Hout	Almere	52°20′N 5°18′E
Almere Stad	Almere	52°22′N 5°13′E
Bant	Noordoostpolder	52°46′N 5°45′E
Biddinghuizen	Dronten	52°27′N 5°42′E
Creil	Noordoostpolder	52°46′N 5°40′E
Dronten	Dronten	52°31′N 5°43′E
Emmeloord	Noordoostpolder	52°43′N 5°45′E
Ens	Noordoostpolder	52°38′N 5°50′E
Espel	Noordoostpolder	52°43′N 5°39′E
Ketelhaven (hamlet of Dronten)	Dronten	52°35′N 5°46′E
Kraggenburg	Noordoostpolder	52°40′N 5°54′E
Lelystad	Lelystad	52°31′N 5°29′E
Lelystad-Haven	Lelystad	52°30′N 5°25′E
Luttelgeest	Noordoostpolder	52°45′N 5°51′E
Marknesse	Noordoostpolder	52°43′N 5°52′E
Nagele	Noordoostpolder	52°39′N 5°44′E
Rutten	Noordoostpolder	52°48′N 5°42′E
Schokland	Noordoostpolder	52°38′N 5°47′E
Swifterbant	Dronten	52°34′N 5°39′E
Tollebeek	Noordoostpolder	52°41′N 5°41′E
Urk	Urk	52°40′N 5°36′E
Zeewolde	Zeewolde	52°20′N 5°32′E
