= Noordoostpolder =

- Municipality
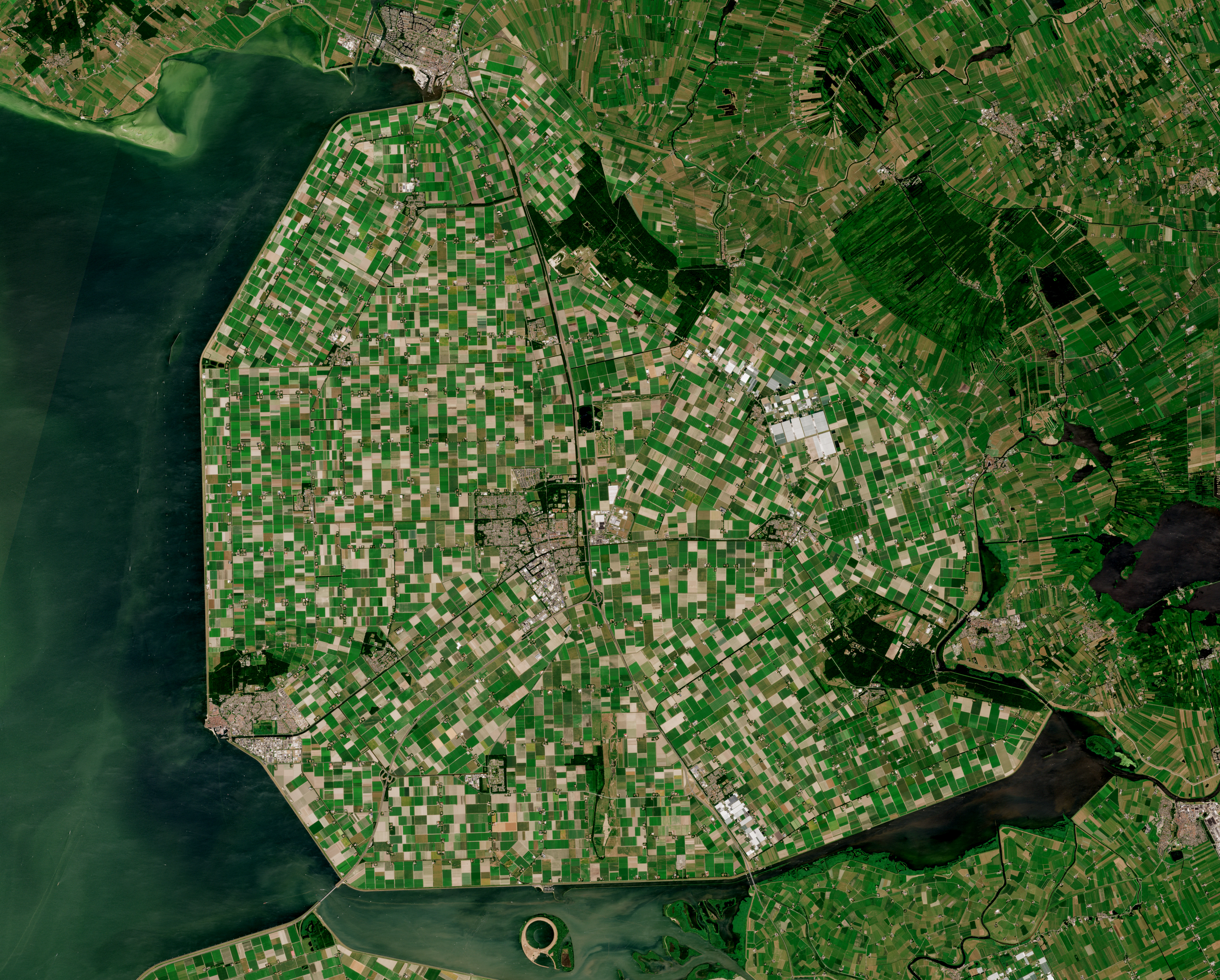
- Satellite image of Noordoostpolder

- Flag Coat of arms

- Location in Flevoland
- Coordinates: 52°43′N 5°45′E
- Country: Netherlands
- Province: Flevoland
- Established: 1 January 1962

Government
  - Body: Municipal council
  - Mayor: Aucke van der Werff (CDA)

Area
  - Total: 593.47 km^{2} (229.14 sq mi)
  - Land: 458.17 km^{2} (176.90 sq mi)
  - Water: 135.30 km^{2} (52.24 sq mi)
- Elevation: −3 m (−9.8 ft)

Population (January 2021)
  - Total: 47,583
  - Density: 104/km^{2} (270/sq mi)
- Time zone: UTC+1 (CET)
  - Summer (DST): UTC+2 (CEST)
- Postcode: 8300–8319
- Area code: 0527
- Website: www.noordoostpolder.nl

Noordoostpolder (Dutch: [ˈnoːrt.oːstˌpɔldər]; English: "North-East Polder") is a polder and municipality in the Flevoland province in the central Netherlands. Formerly, it was also called Urker Land. Emmeloord is the administrative center, located in the heart of the Noordoostpolder.

For history, see Zuiderzee Works.

== Population centres ==
The population centres are Bant, Creil, Emmeloord, Ens, Espel, Kraggenburg, Luttelgeest, Marknesse, Nagele, Rutten, and Tollebeek.

The former island of Schokland is now a museum.

The town of Urk, a former island in the southwest that is now surrounded by the Noordoostpolder, is a separate municipality.

=== Topography ===
Dutch topographic map of the municipality of Noordoostpolder, June 2015

== Rail links ==
There are no railway stations in the Noordoostpolder, but the nearest stations are in Kampen, Steenwijk and Lelystad. From 9 December 2012, with the opening of the Hanzelijn, Dronten and Kampen Zuid, will be even closer.

== UNESCO World Heritage sites ==
UNESCO World Heritage sites located in/near the Noordoostpolder:

- Schokland and Surroundings (municipality Noordoostpolder)
- Ir.D.F. Woudagemaal (D.F. Wouda Steam Pumping Station), Lemmer (mun. Lemsterland)

== Notable people ==
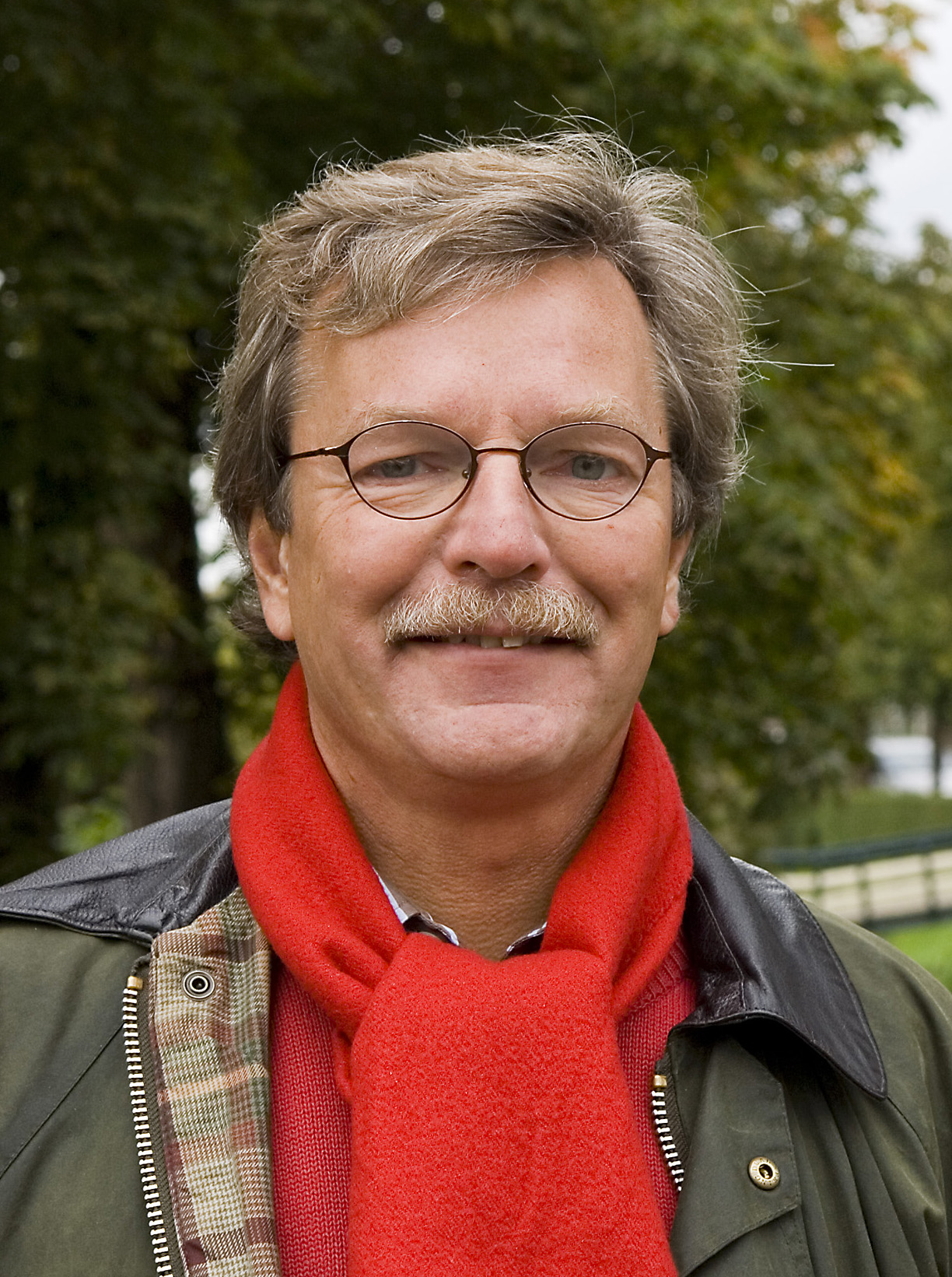
Aucke van der Werff

- David T. Runia (born 1951 in Noordoostpolder) a Dutch-Australian scholar and educational administrator
- Aucke van der Werff (born 1953 in Schettens) politician, current mayor of Noordoostpolder
- Rien van der Velde (born 1957 in Nagele) a Dutch politician
- Stef Blok (born 1964 in Emmeloord) accountant and politician, Minister of Foreign Affairs
- Marriët Schuurman (born 1969 in Creil) incumbent Dutch Human Rights Ambassador
- Ernst Meisner (born 1982 in Noordoostpolder) a Dutch dancer and choreographer

=== Sport ===
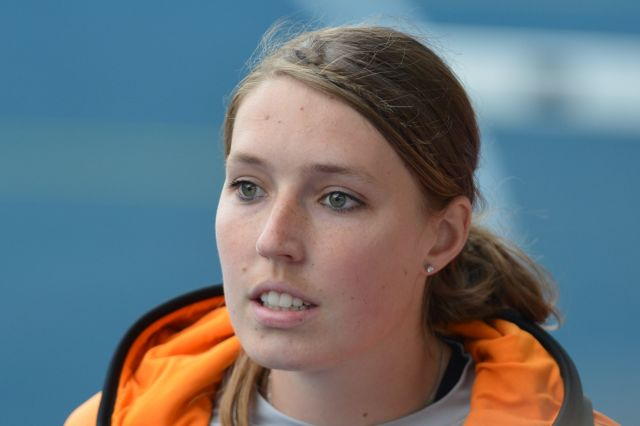
Corinne Nugter in 2014

- Annamarie Thomas (born 1971 in Emmeloord) a Dutch former speed skater
- Rob Wielaert (born 1978 in Emmeloord) a Dutch footballer
- Diederik Boer (born 1980 in Emmeloord) a Dutch football goalkeeper
- Orlando Wirth (born 1981 in Emmeloord) a Dutch footballer
- Tjeerd Korf (born 1983 in Emmeloord) a Dutch footballer
- Corinne Nugter (born 1992 in Emmeloord) a Dutch discus thrower
- Femke Beuling (born 1999 in Emmeloord) a Dutch speed skater

== See also ==
- Noordoostpolder Airport
