= RKO (disambiguation) =

RKO refers to RKO Pictures, an American film company.

RKO may also refer to:

== Organisations ==
- RKO General, holding company for General Tire and Rubber Company up to 1981
  - RKO Radio Network, a subsidiary of RKO General
- Rutten Komt Op, a football team of Rutten, Flevoland

== Other ==
- Reichskommissariat Ostland, Nazi-controlled Baltic territory in WWII
- Randal Keith Orton or Randy Orton, a professional wrestler signed to WWE
  - his finishing move, the RKO, a jumping cutter
  - Rated-RKO, his former wrestling team
