= Marriët Schuurman =

Dutch ambassador in Israel

Ambassador Maria Henriëtte "Marriët" Schuurman (born 20 September 1969, in Creil) is the current Dutch ambassador in Israel. Previously, she was the Dutch Human Rights' Ambassador.

== Career ==
Shuurman was assigned as the NATO Secretary General's Special Representative for Women, Peace, and Security in October 2014. In this position, she was the point of contact for all aspects related to NATO's contributions to the Women, Peace, and Security agenda. Shuurman was also responsible for facilitating the coordination and consistency of NATO policies and activities which promote the implementation of the NATO/EAPC Policy and Action Plan on the Implementation of United Nations Security Council Resolution (UNSCR) 1325 and related Resolutions].

In 2023, she was appointed as the ambassador of the Netherlands in Israel. Later in July 2025, Schuurman was summoned by the Israeli government after the Netherlands imposed a travel ban against Itamar Ben-Gvir and Bezalel Smotrich over their calls for ethnic cleansing in Gaza.
