= Noordoostpolder Airport =

Former airfield in Emmeloord

Noordoostpolder Airport Vliegveld Noordoostpolder
- IATA: none; ICAO: EHNP

Summary
- Airport type: Public
- Operator: Kuiken BV
- Serves: Emmeloord
- Location: Emmeloord
- Elevation AMSL: −12 ft (−3.7 m)
- Coordinates: 52°43′52″N 005°44′50″E
- Interactive map of Noordoostpolder Airport

Runways
Direction	Length		Surface
Direction	m	ft	Surface
09/27	725	-	Grass

Noordoostpolder Airport was a small airport located near Emmeloord, Netherlands. The airport was named after the Noordoostpolder in which it was located. It was used primarily by gliders and cropduster flights.

The airport was closed to make room for a residential area.
