= Aucke van der Werff =

Dutch politician

Mayor of Noordoostpolder
- In office 3 May 2010 – 1 October 2018
- Preceded by: Willem van Rappard
- Succeeded by: Henk Tiesinga (acting)

Mayor of Het Bildt
- In office 2003–2010
- Preceded by: Klaas Dankert
- Succeeded by: Gerrit Krol (acting)

Personal details
- Born: September 3, 1953 (age 73) Schettens, Netherlands
- Education: Johannes Calvijnlyceum
- Occupation: Politician, teacher

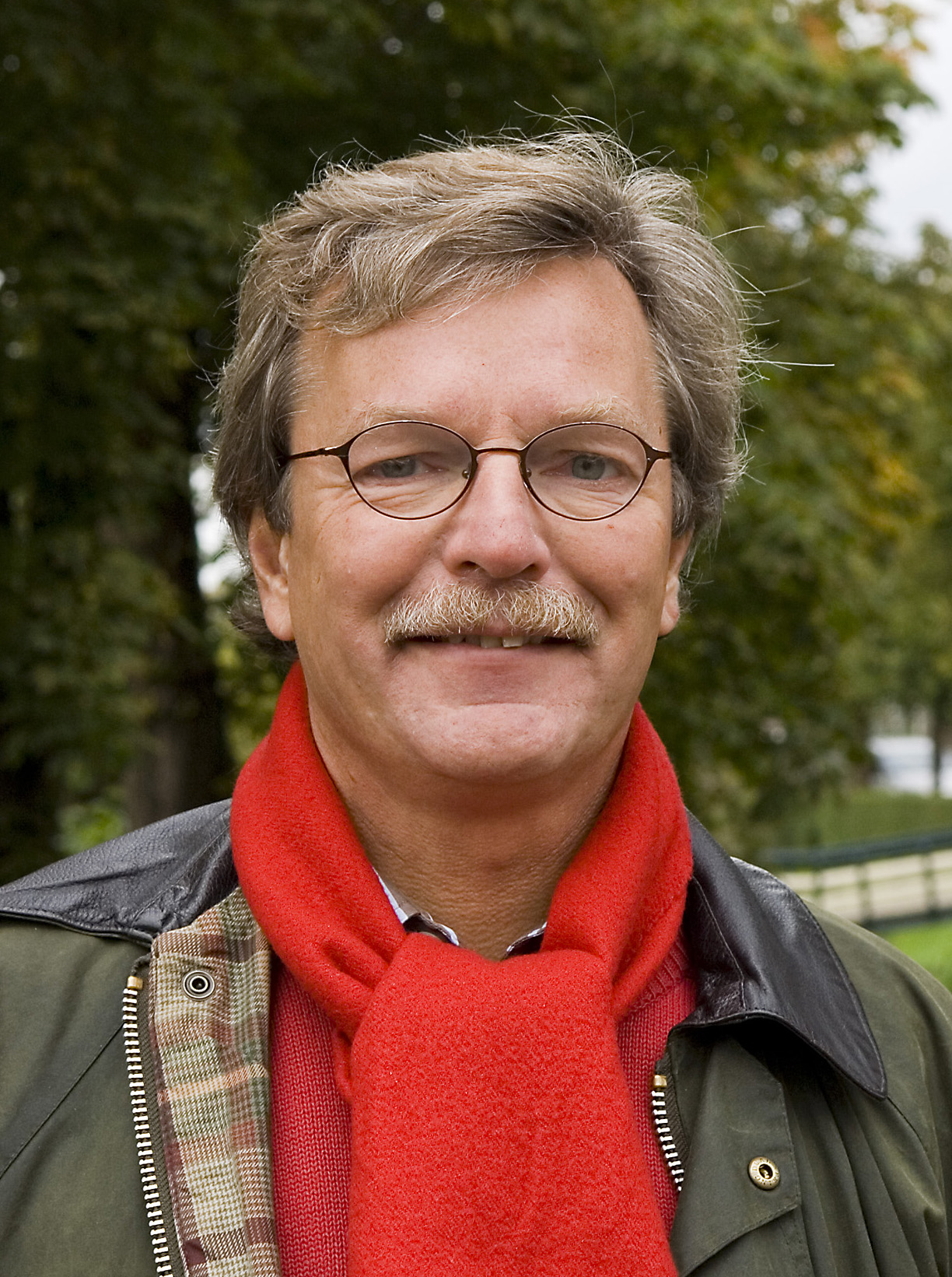
Aucke van der Werff

== Early life and career ==
Aucke van der Werff was born on 3 September 1953 in Schettens, Friesland. He attended the Johannes Calvijnlyceum in Kampen and later pursued studies in the Dutch and English languages. Prior to his full-time entry into public administration, he worked professionally as an English language teacher.

His political career with the Christian Democratic Appeal (CDA) began in local governance in Friesland. He served as a municipal councillor for the former municipality of Wymbritseradiel from 1990 to 1998, and subsequently served as an alderman from 1998 until 2002.

== Mayoralties ==
=== Het Bildt (2003–2010) ===
In 2003, Van der Werff was appointed as the mayor of Het Bildt, a municipality in northern Friesland, succeeding Klaas Dankert. He served in this capacity for seven years until his relocation to Flevoland.

=== Noordoostpolder (2010–2018) ===
In February 2010, the municipal council of Noordoostpolder nominated Van der Werff to succeed Willem van Rappard. He officially assumed office on 3 May 2010.

In June 2015, Van der Werff made local news when he jumped into the Zwolsevaart canal in Marknesse to rescue a citizen who was drowning after getting entangled in water plants. For this intervention, he was later awarded a medal and certificate by the Maatschappij tot Redding van Drenkelingen (Society for the Rescue of Drowning Persons) during a municipal ceremony in January 2016.

Van der Werff announced his retirement from politics in 2018, officially stepping down from his mayoral duties on 1 October 2018. He was temporarily succeeded by acting mayor Henk Tiesinga.
