= Creil, Netherlands =

Creil
- Village
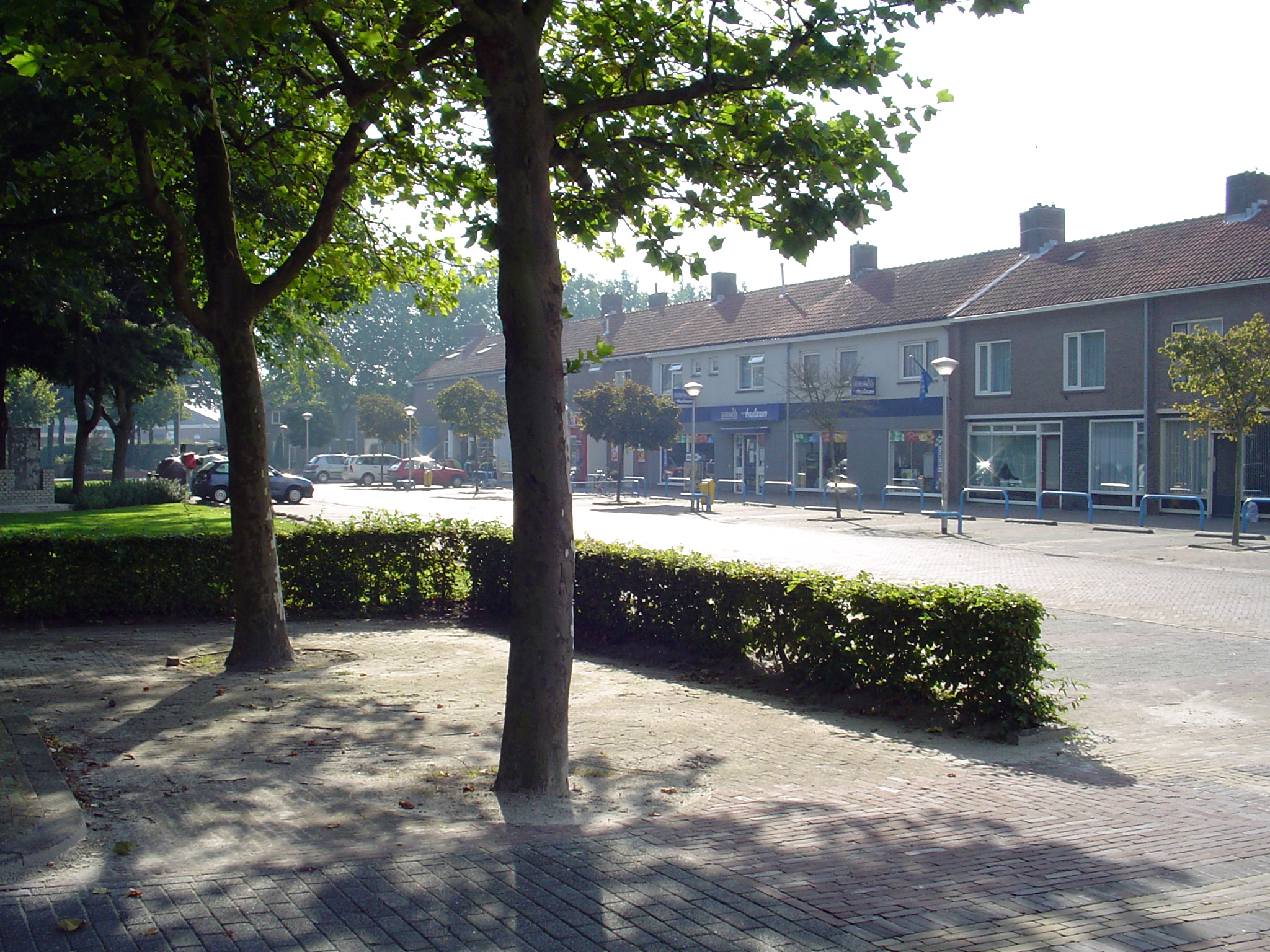
- Square in Creil

- Flag Coat of arms

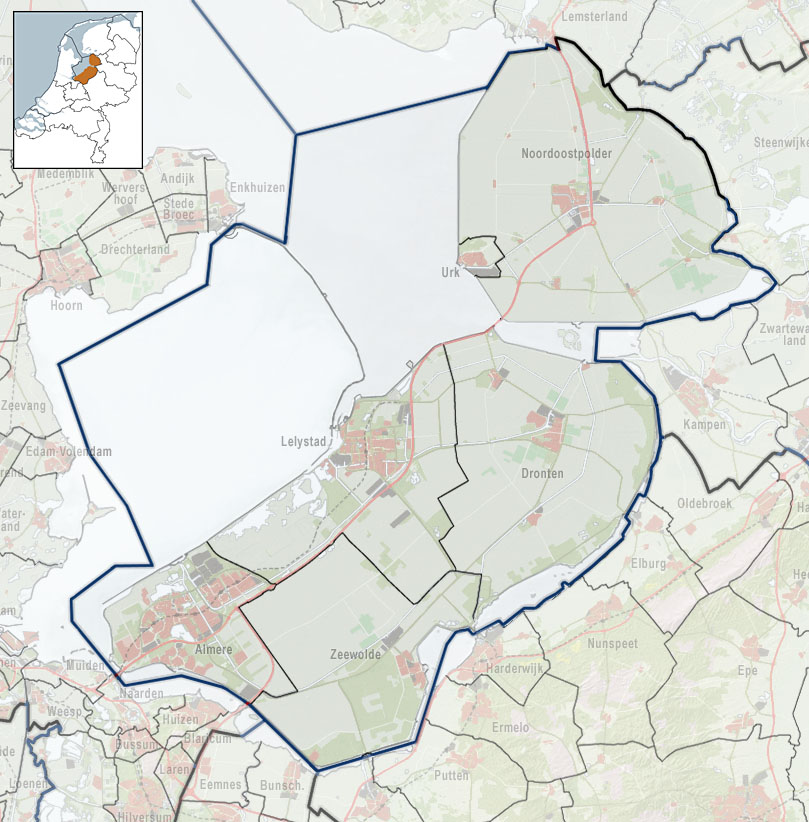
- Location of Creil in the province of Flevoland Creil (Netherlands)
- Coordinates: 52°45′47″N 5°39′41″E
- Country: Netherlands
- Province: Flevoland
- Municipality: Noordoostpolder

Area
  - Total: 32.38 km^{2} (12.50 sq mi)
- Elevation: −3 m (−9.8 ft)

Population (2021)
  - Total: 1,695
  - Density: 52.35/km^{2} (135.6/sq mi)
- Time zone: UTC+1 (CET)
  - Summer (DST): UTC+2 (CEST)
- Postcode: 8312
- Area code: 0527

Creil is one of the ten so-called green villages (Dutch: groendorpen) in the Dutch province of Flevoland. It is a part of the municipality of Noordoostpolder, and lies about 6 km northwest of Emmeloord.

== Name ==
The name Creil comes from the name of a former village that was once on the coast of the Zuiderzee, which was in turn named after the Creil Woods that was once located northeast of North-Holland, in what is now the IJsselmeer, roughly between Texel and Enkhuizen.

== History ==
Modern Creil was designed by the Board of the Wieringermeer, one of whose jobs was to design and oversee the construction of the settlements in the newly created polders, construction of the town started in 1953.

== Facilities ==
In 2004, a building formerly belonging to the Catholic church in the centre of Creil was restructured into a service centre called The Saalicon. It houses a pharmacy, clinic, hair salon, centre for the elderly and several art exhibitions of local artists.

Creil is home to three elementary schools, the Catholic Jan Roothaan-school, the public elementary school De Springplank and the Christian elementary school De Regenboog. These schools share the same building and share many public facilities such as the schoolyard and the gymnastics hall.

The land surrounding Creil is home to large amounts of bulb cultivation, and every spring the village organises the Bloembollen Vakdagen Flevoland, a competition between local bulb flower growers.

Creil is home to a football club, SC Creil, and houses a Protestant church.

== Transportation ==
Creil has a bus connection, Line 77, which connects Creil with other villages in the Noordoostpolder.

- Line 77: Lemmer - Rutten - Creil - Espel - Emmeloord vv.

The line makes three stops on three bus stations in Creil, namely the Klutenpad, Creil and Wrakkenpad stations. Despite being close in proximity, there is no direct bus line to Bant.

Creil is connected by road via the provincial roads N712, which runs through the town, and N715. These provincial roads form the main road connection with other towns in the area and subsequently with the larger motorway and highway network. The N712 runs through Creil from the southwest to the northeast, connecting to Espel in the southwest and to Rutten in the northeast. The N715 branches off just to the northeast of Creil and connects Bant to the east.

Creil has no rail connection; the nearest train stations are in Kampen, Meppel, Zwolle, Dronten and Lelystad.

== Gallery ==
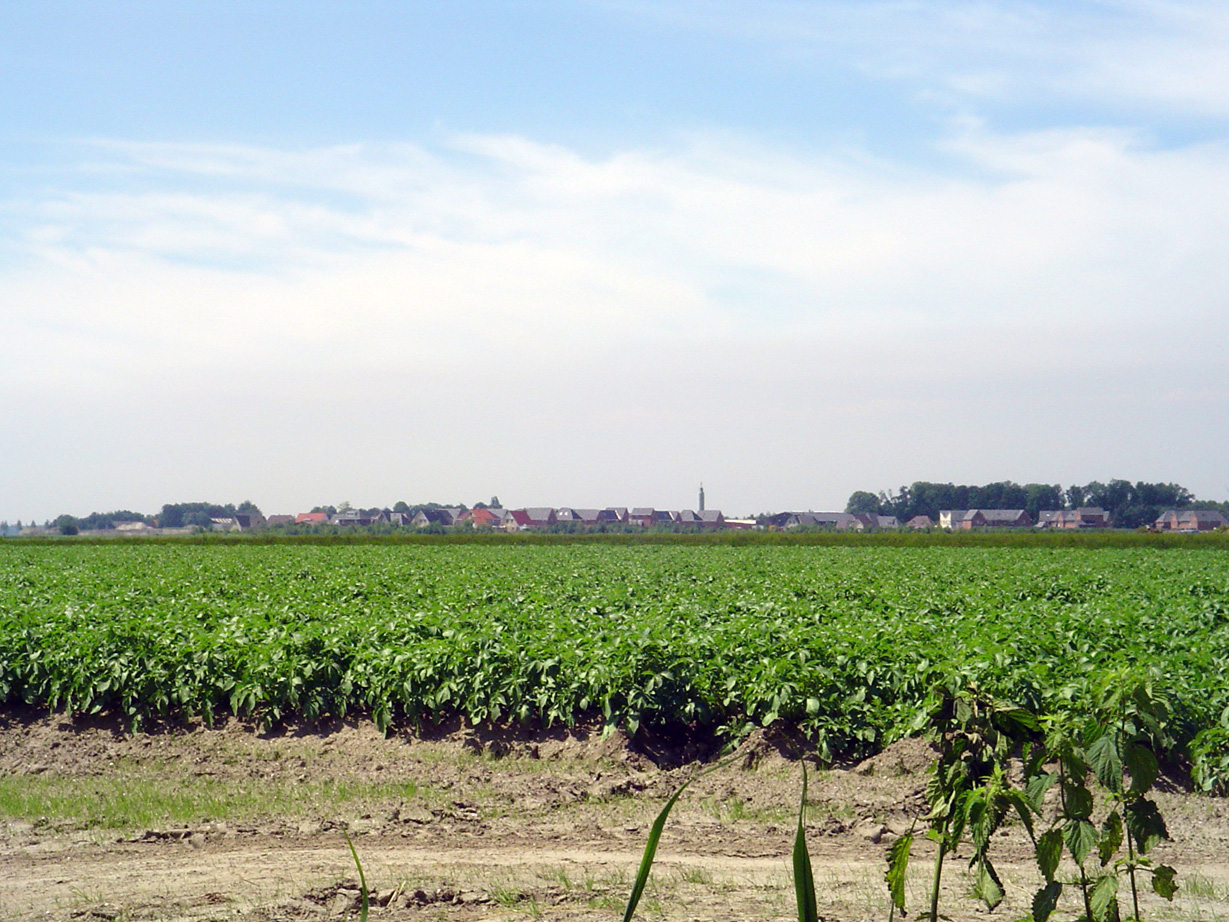
Creil as seen from a distance over crop fields.

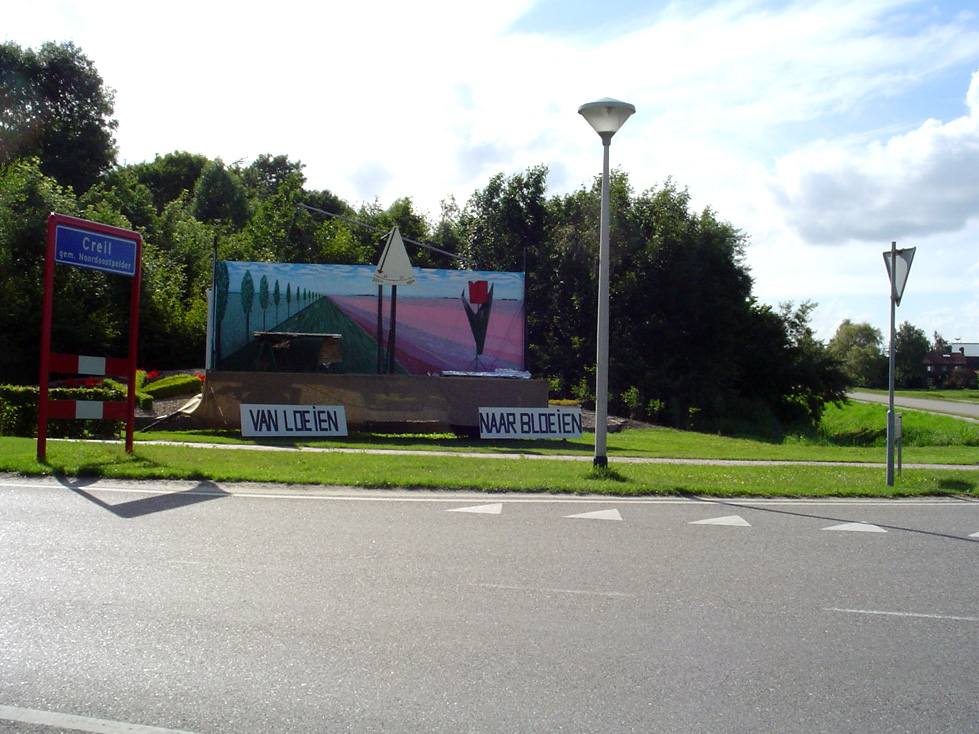
Eastern entrance of Creil, during the 50 year anniversary of the town in 2003.

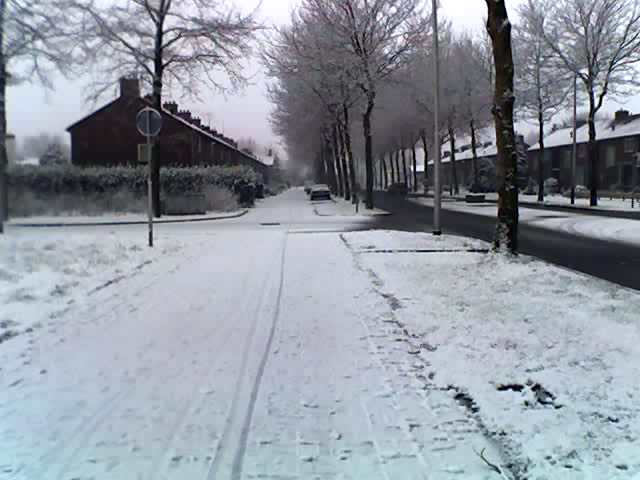
Creil during wintertime in 2005.

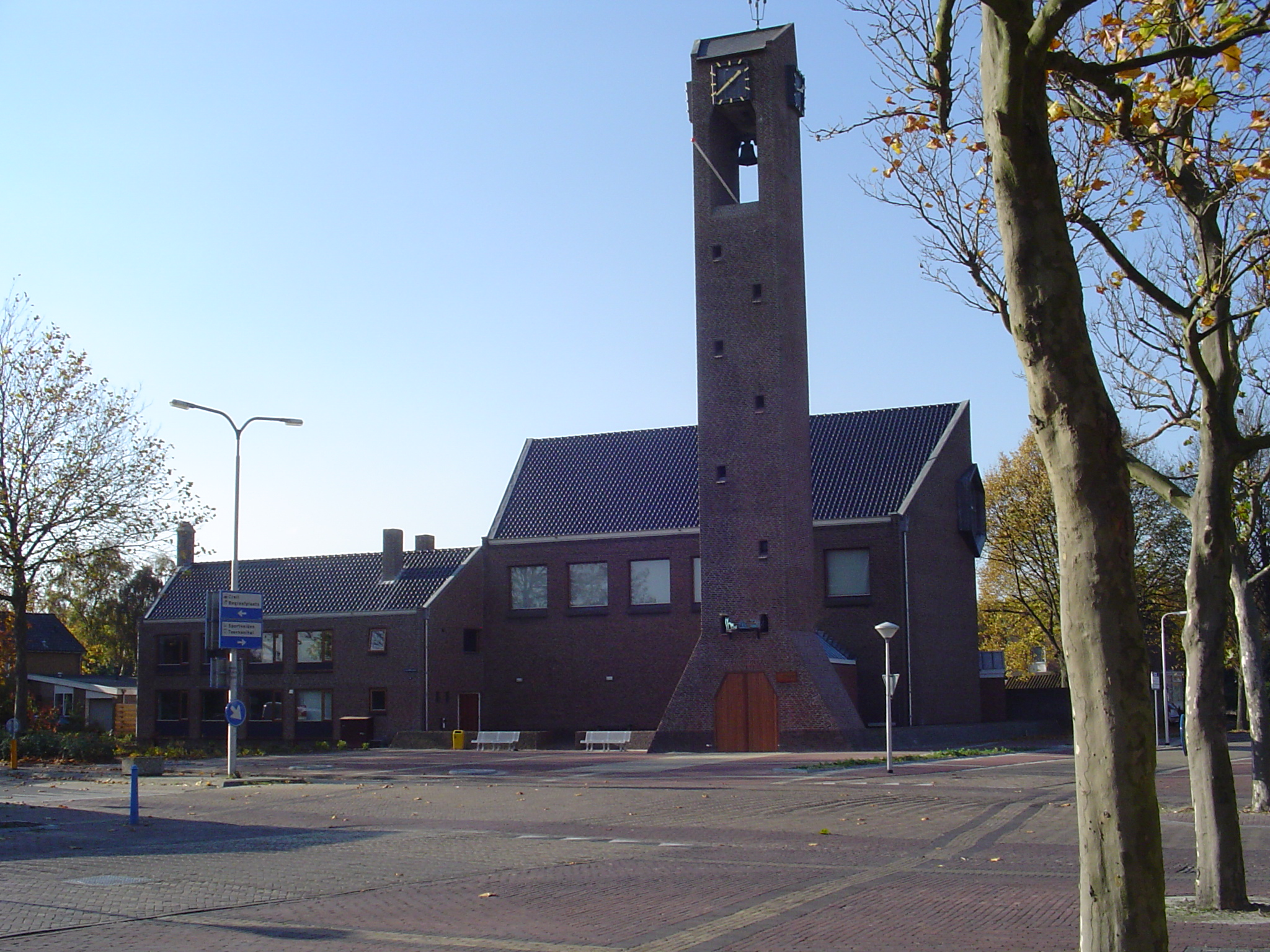
The Protestant, and nowadays only, church in Creil.

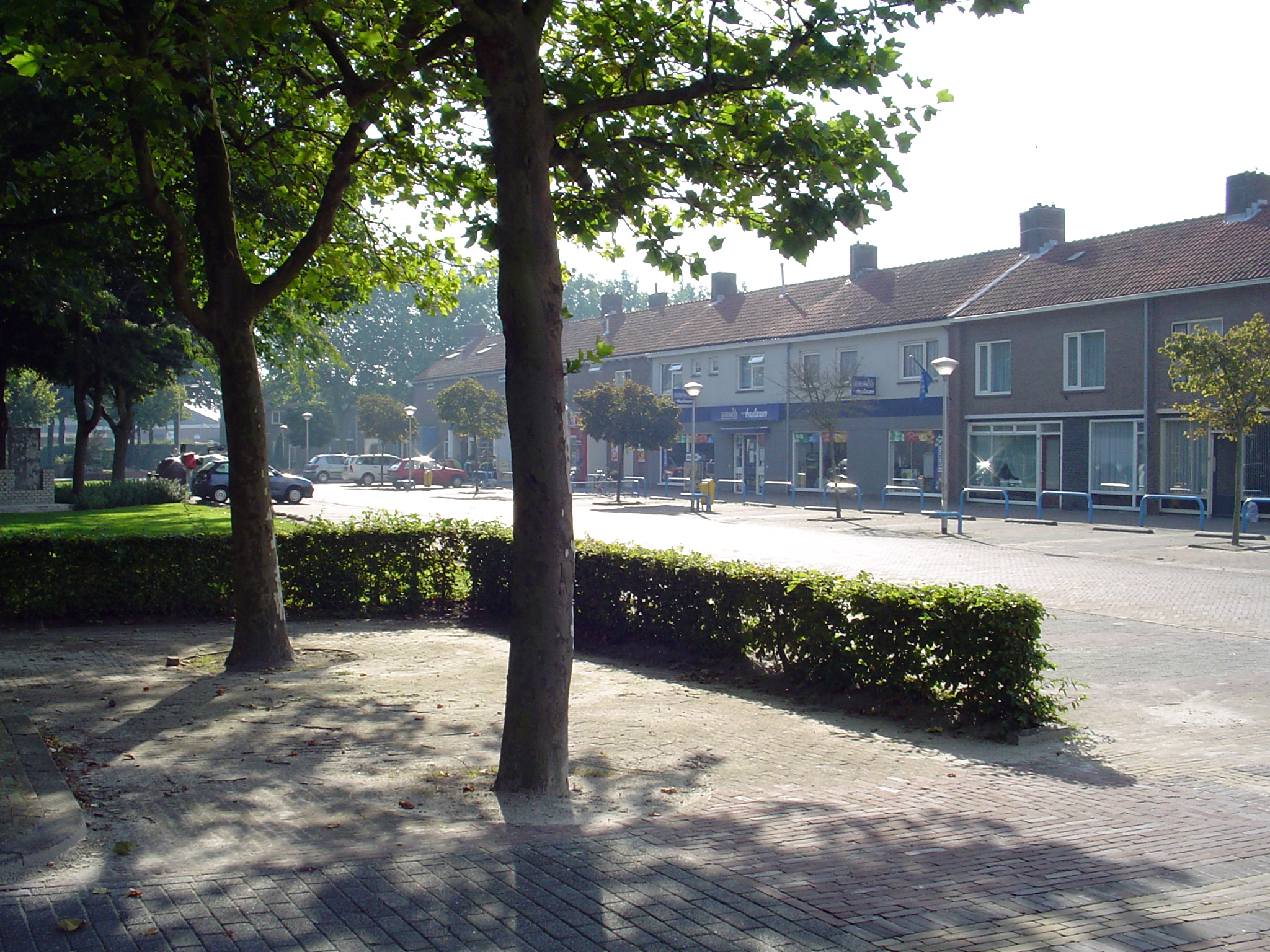
The village centre, housing stores, the post office, medical centre, church, fuel station, a FIAT dealer and the bus station.

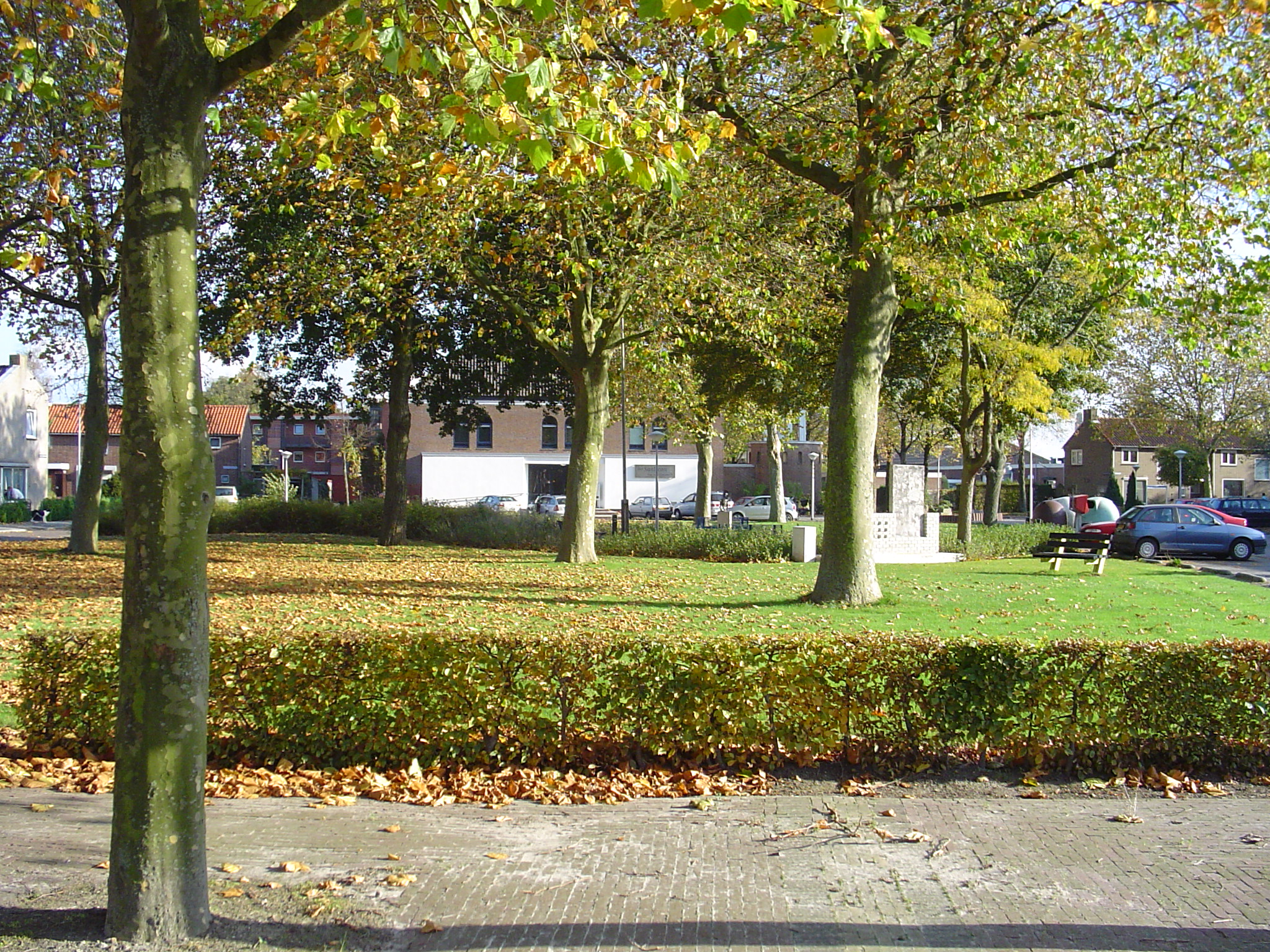
The Saalicon, as seen from the village centre.
