= Espel =

- Village
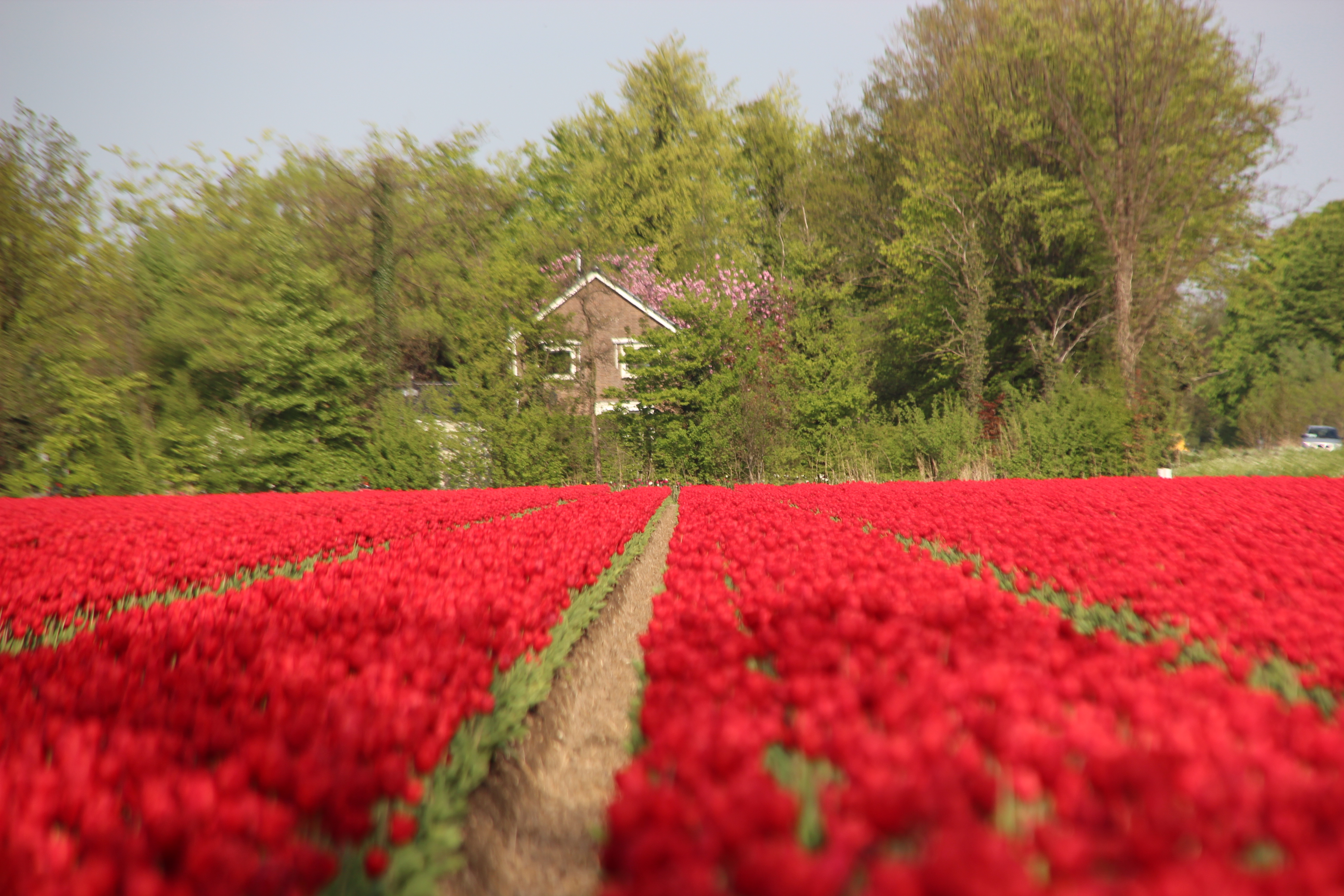
- Flowers near Espel

- Flag

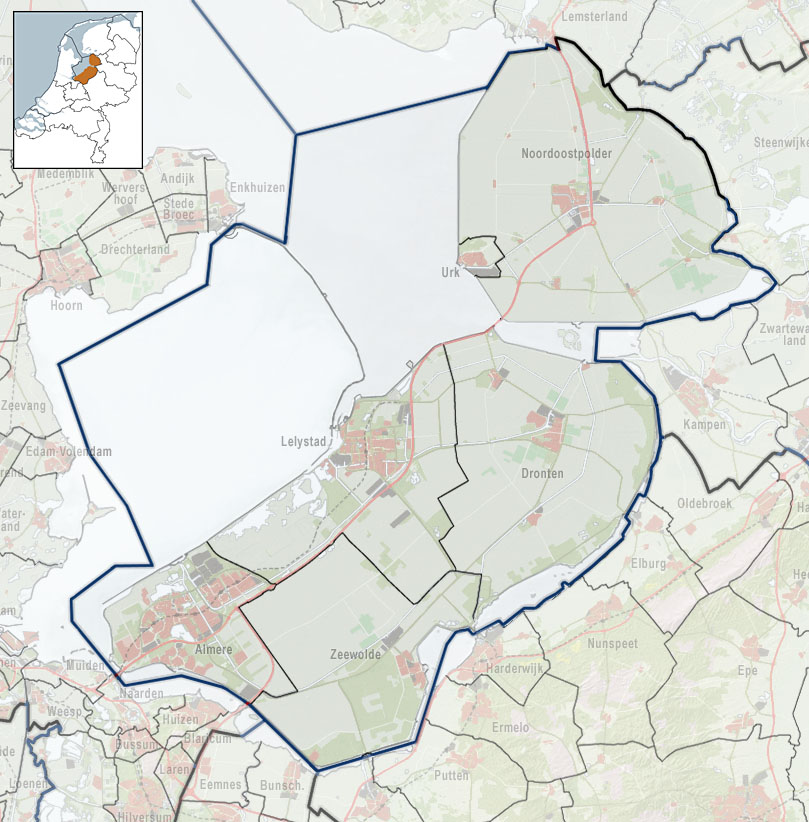
- Location of Espel in the province of Flevoland Espel (Netherlands)
- Coordinates: 52°43′27″N 5°38′39″E
- Country: Netherlands
- Province: Flevoland
- Municipality: Noordoostpolder
- Established: 1956

Area
  - Total: 33.48 km^{2} (12.93 sq mi)
- Elevation: −4.1 m (−13 ft)

Population (2021)
  - Total: 1,515
  - Density: 45.25/km^{2} (117.2/sq mi)
- Time zone: UTC+1 (CET)
  - Summer (DST): UTC+2 (CEST)
- Postcode: 8311
- Area code: 0527

Espel is one of the so-called green villages (Dutch: groendorpen) in the Dutch province of Flevoland. It lies in the municipality of Noordoostpolder next to a crossroads where provincial road N712 from Urk to Lemmer intersects with road N714 to Emmeloord, roughly 6 km (3.7 mi) to the east.

== Name ==
Espel is named after the former village of Espelbergh, also known as Espelo, which was situated north of Urk until it and a large amount of nearby land were washed away in the All Saints' Flood of 1570.

== History ==
Espel was founded in 1956 as an agricultural settlement and one of the green villages spread around the Noordoostpolder. Shortly after being founded Espel was granted several facilities, namely shops, three schools, two churches and two cafeterias.

== Facilities ==
=== General facilities ===
Today Espel features its own church, a school, a cafeteria with restaurant and bowling centre, and athletic fields for the local football club, FC Espel.

In 2002 the last supermarket in the village shut down, and in 2009 the last shop closed its doors as well. In 2011, by public initiative, a new supermarket called the Troefmarkt was opened by an entrepreneur from Lelystad. In 2014 the store was bought by a different entrepreneur from the nearby Tollebeek, and was added to his chain of Attent supermarkets.

=== Church ===
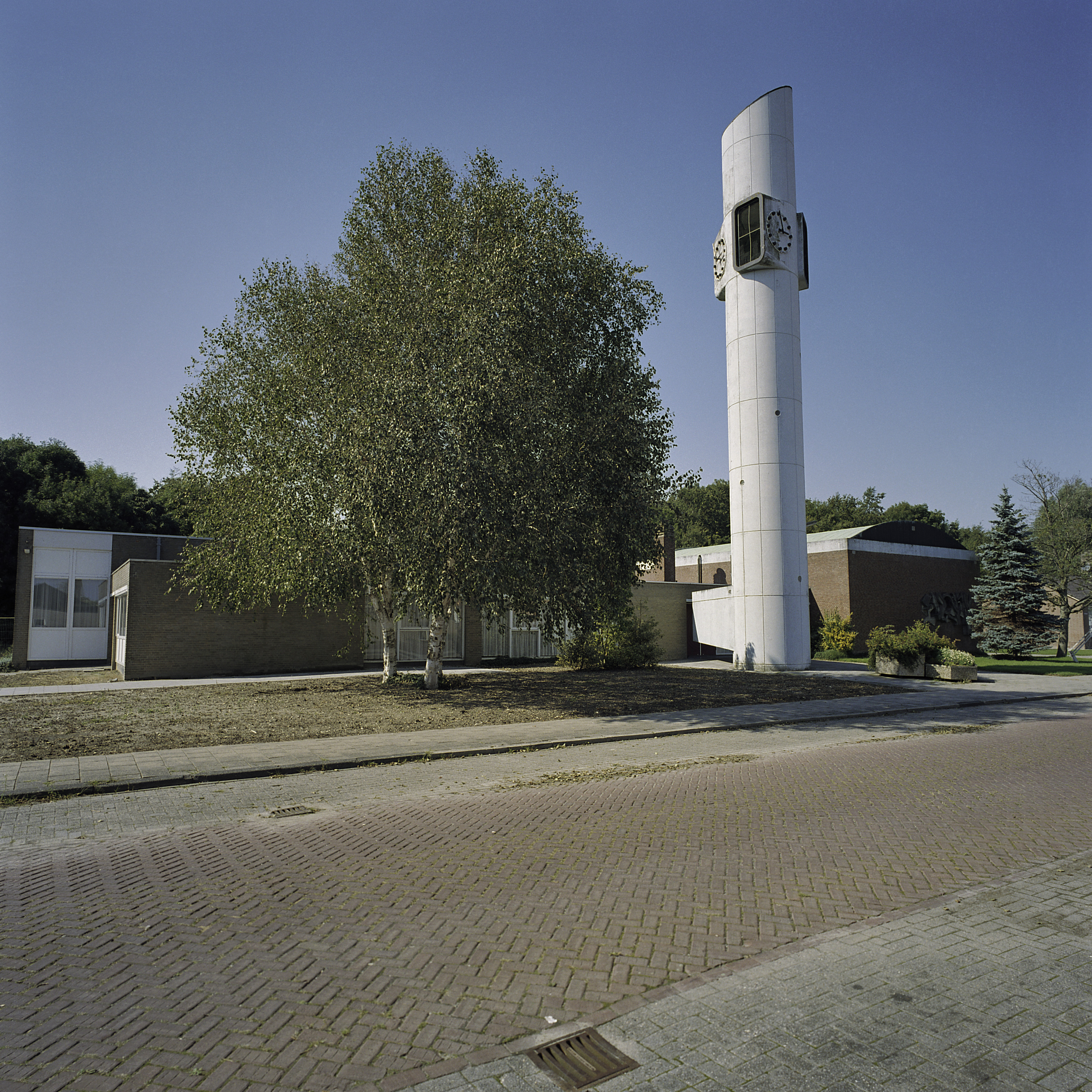
Tower of the Una Sancta

The local church, the Una Sancta, was built from 1959 to 1962, relatively shortly after the founding of Espel and is operated by the Protestant Church in the Netherlands, abbreviated as PKN, a 2004 merger of many former Protestant churches. The modern white cylindrical church tower especially stands out in its unique style.

From 1960 to 1961 a second, Catholic church was built in the village. It was named Kerk van de Verrijzenis des Heren, which translates to Church of the Rising of the Lord. It is no longer in use.

=== Surrounding countryside ===
The area around Espel is an important area in the cultivation of bulbous flowers, mainly but not exclusively tulips. Each spring a walking and cycling route is laid out along the blooming fields.

To the west of Espel, along the dyke that forms the coast with the IJsselmeer, is Windpark Noordoostpolder, a partially on-shore, partially off-shore wind farm. It opened in June 2016 and is the largest wind farm of its kind in the Netherlands. The windpark will feature a total of 86 wind turbines upon completion in 2017.

== Public transportation ==
Espel has a bus connection operated by Connexxion, Line 77, which connects Espel with other villages in the Noordoostpolder.

- Line 77: Lemmer - Rutten - Creil - Espel - Emmeloord vv.

Espel is connected by road via provincial road N712 which leads to Tollebeek Urk to the south, and Creil, Rutten and Lemmer to the North. Provincial road N714 starts in Espel and heads east to Emmeloord.

There is no railway station in Espel, but the nearest stations are in Kampen, Dronten and Lelystad.

== Gallery ==
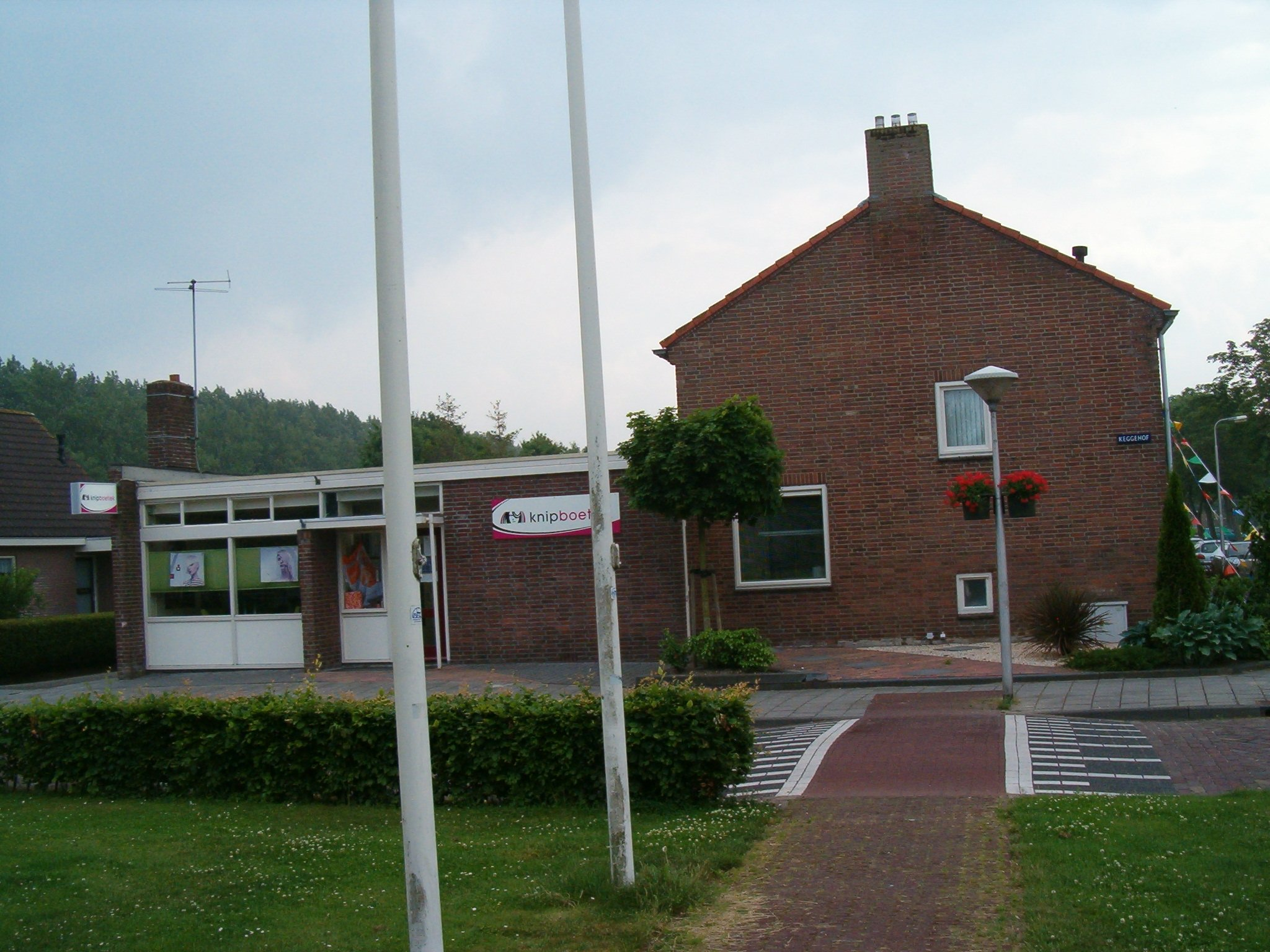
Hair dresser

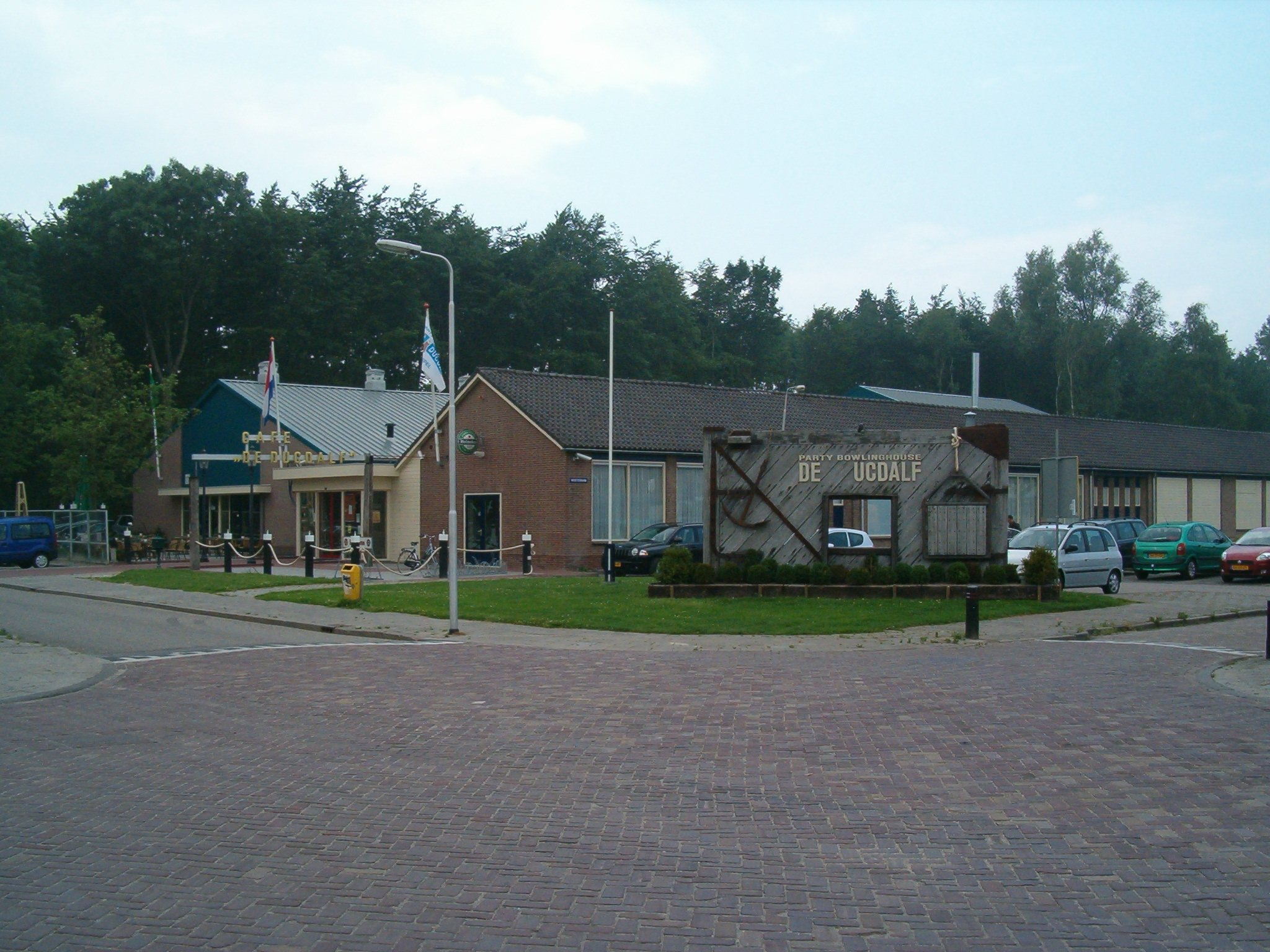
Party centre and bowling alley
