= Orlando Wirht =

Dutch footballer

Personal information
- Date of birth: 25 May 1981 (age 45)
- Place of birth: Emmeloord, Netherlands
- Position: Centre-back

Youth career
- FC Twente
- Go Ahead Eagles

Senior career*
Years	Team	Apps	(Gls)
2002–2003	Stormvogels Telstar	4	(0)

International career
1999	Netherlands U18	2	(0)
- * Club domestic league appearances and goals

Orlando Wirht (born 25 May 1981) is a Dutch former professional footballer who played as a centre-back.

== Club career ==
Wirht played youth football for FC Twente and Go Ahead Eagles. He played one season in the Eerste Divisie for Stormvogels Telstar, making four appearances. As his contract was set to expire in June 2003, he trialled with Iraklis in May 2003 where compatriot Regillio Vrede already played. Earlier he had an unsuccessful trial with Danish Superliga club OB. After failing to find a new club, Wirht played for CSV Apeldoorn in the lower tiers.

== International career ==
He is a Netherlands youth international, having gained two caps for the Netherlands U18 team.
