= Bant =

- Village
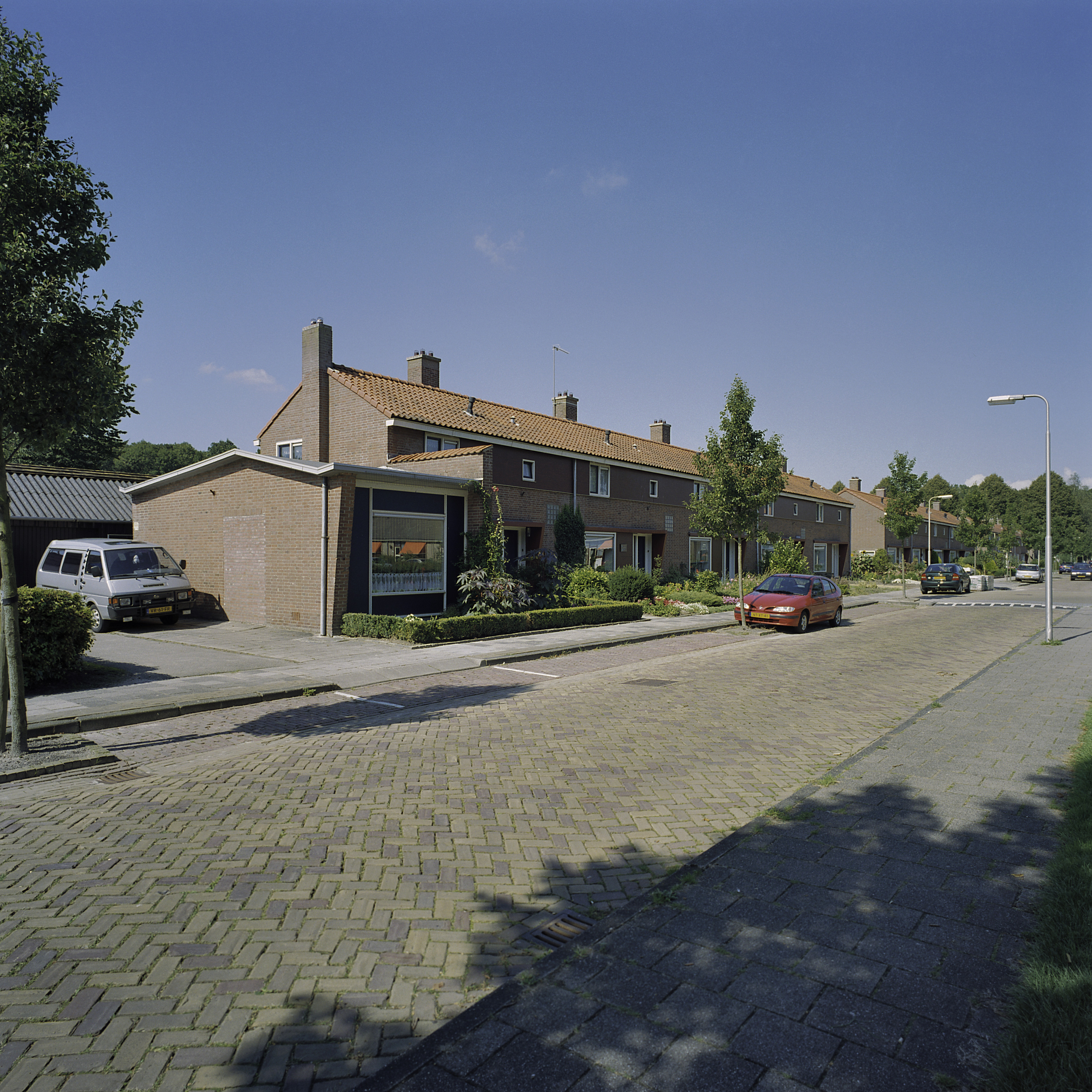
- Street view

- Flag

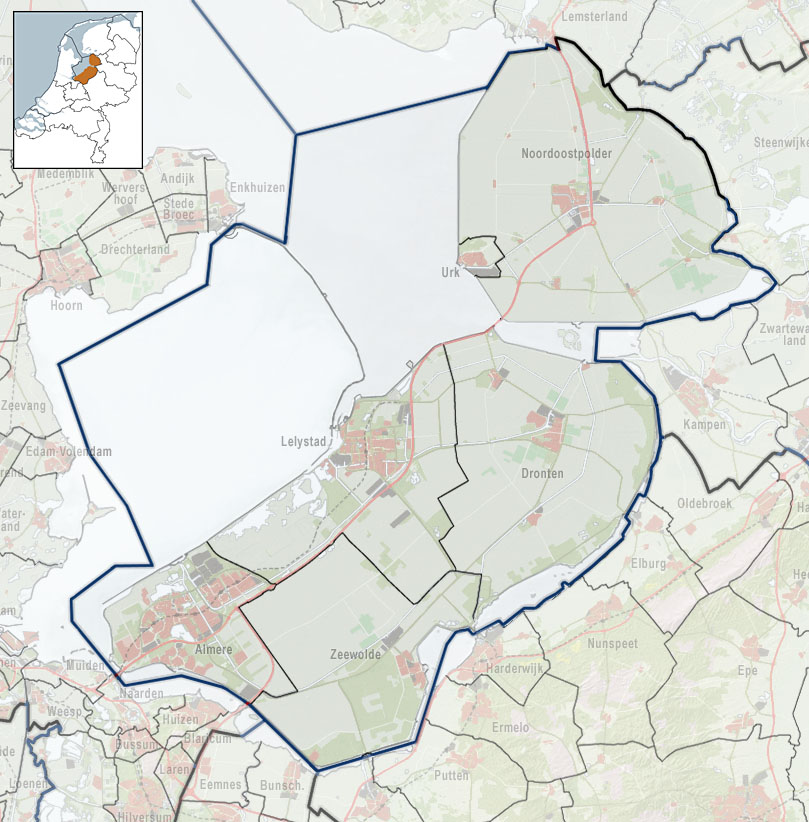
- Location of Bant in the province of Flevoland Bant (Netherlands)
- Coordinates: 52°46′9″N 5°45′0″E
- Country: Netherlands
- Province: Flevoland
- Municipality: Noordoostpolder
- Established: 1951

Area
  - Total: 39.99 km^{2} (15.44 sq mi)
- Elevation: −3.5 m (−11 ft)

Population (2021)
  - Total: 1,495
  - Density: 37.38/km^{2} (96.83/sq mi)
- Time zone: UTC+1 (CET)
  - Summer (DST): UTC+2 (CEST)
- Postcode: 8314
- Area code: 0527

Bant is one of the so-called green villages (Dutch: groendorpen) in the Dutch province of Flevoland. It is a part of the municipality of Noordoostpolder, and lies about 7 km north of Emmeloord.

== Name ==
The name Bant is derived from the estates of Bant or Bantega, which at one point existed in what is now the municipality of De Fryske Marren, and extended into the area that is now the Noordoostpolder.

== History ==
=== Prison camp ===
After World War II, before the founding of Bant, the site was used as a prisoner camp for Nazi-collaborators under the name Kamp Westvaart. The camp was accommodated with watchtowers and armed guards. Several prominent collaborators served sentences in the camp. Jan Gunnink, former head of the KP-Meppel, a prominent resistance movement during the war, served as camp commander.

The camp was subject of a social experiment, in which prisoners were offered a contract in which they declared they would not resist and fight in exchange for free movement within the camp. Every prisoner signed the contract. The experiment was later cancelled, but because every prisoner kept to their promises, they were set free. Remaining sentences were instead served out as regular labourer.

=== Founding ===
Modern Bant was designed by the board of the Wieringermmer, one of whose jobs was to design and oversee the construction of ten settlements in the Noordoostpolder around the town of Emmeloord. Bant was thus founded in 1951 to the north of Emmeloord, which was founded in 1943, in land reclaimed from the IJsselmeer.

=== Recent history ===
In 1998, part of the children's movie The Flying Liftboy, known in Dutch as Abeltje was shot in the town. The town's formerly reformed church, not the Bantsiliek, served as an important piece of decor behind the department store in which the protagonist worked as an elevator boy. In an important scene, the elevator is sent flying out of the elevator shaft, and the church features prominently. The church building has since been sold to a private owner.

Bant celebrated its 60th anniversary in 2011.

== Facilities ==
=== Bantsiliek ===
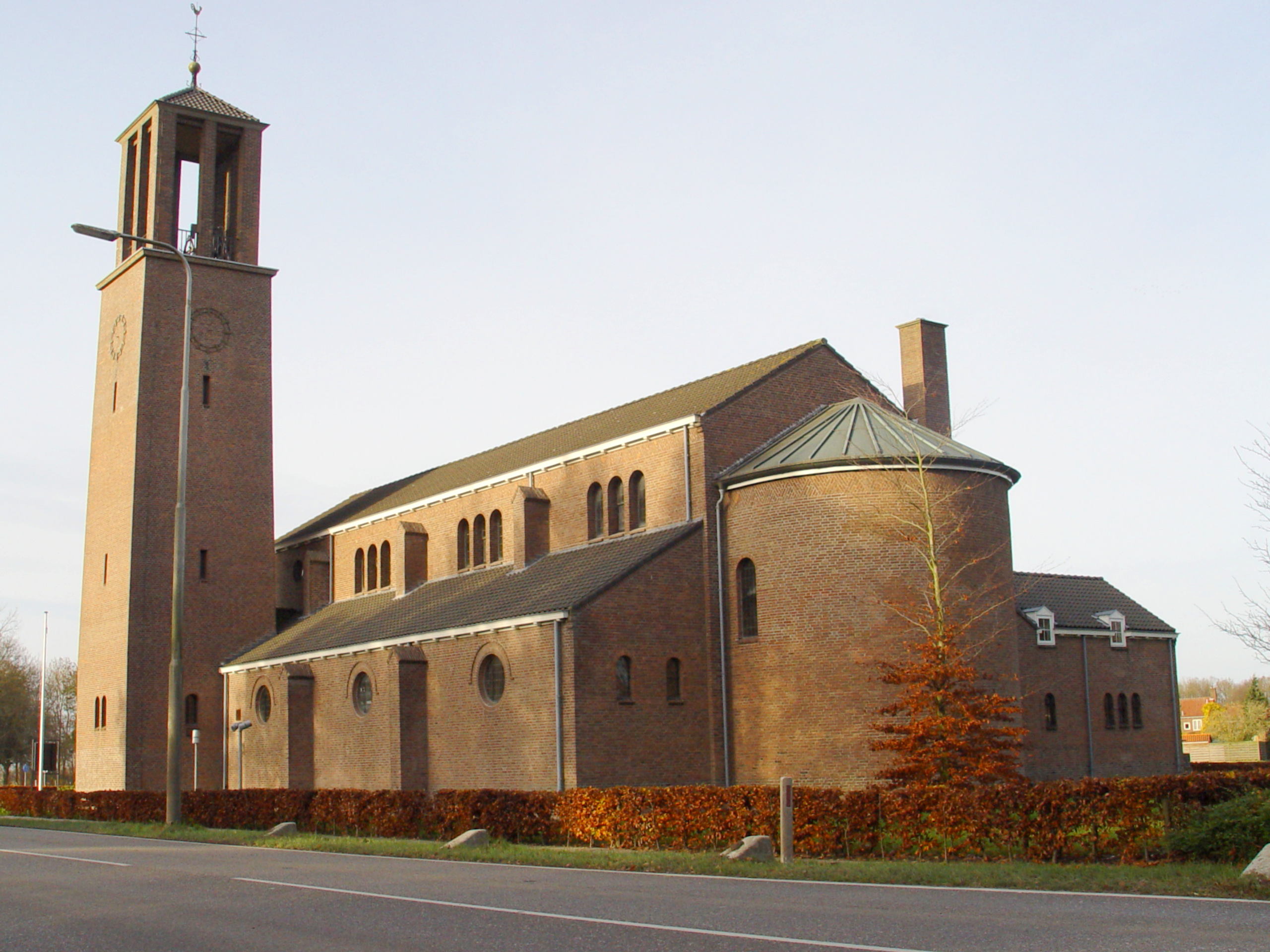
The Bantsiliek in Bant

In 1955, a Catholic church was built in Bant, and was given the name Bantsiliek, a portmanteau of Bant and basiliek, the Dutch word for basilica. The church was dedicated to Ludger. At first the church was part of to the Diocese of Utrecht, but was later transferred to the Diocese of Groningen. As the population growth in Bant fell behind expectations, the parish was merged with the parishes in Creil, dedicated to Nicholas, and Rutten, dedicated to Servatius in 1991. The new parish was named "The Good Shepherd" (Dutch: De Goede Herder). In 2001 the churches in Bant and Creil were shut down due to falling numbers of churchgoers. Their inventories were largely incorporated in the church in Rutten.

After 2001, the church building was re-purposed as the new location of the municipal initiative Samen op Weg, which aimed to unite the various Dutch Protestant churches and house them together in the same church building. The other church buildings were sold and the main hall of the Bantsiliek was divided in two, a church hall and a reception area. The chapel dedicated to Maria remained as a place of silence. Large parts of the church have been modified and the church was ready for use on Saturday 27 November 2004, and was officially commissioned on Sunday 23 January 2005.

In 2009, the church, designed by Antonius Vosman Junior, took part in the finals round of "The Most Beautiful Church of the Netherlands" (Dutch: De Mooiste Kerk van Nederland) of the NCRV radio-programme Plaza. The church received the most votes, but the jury elected the Sint-Willibrordusbasiliek in Hulst as winner instead.

=== Others ===
Bant is also home to two elementary schools, a sporting club, a holiday park, a small industrial area, and a driving school, as well as several bars and restaurants. Since 2023, Bant has not had a supermarket. Every five year, Bant is the scene of a major town feast.

== Transportation ==
Bant lies on the crossroads of the provincial roads N715 and N718, the latter of which ends in Bant and extends north beyond Bant as the Lemsterweg. The N715 leads to Creil in the west, and an on-ramp onto the nearby A6 motorway, beyond which it connects to Kuinre via the N351, and Luttelgeest. The N718 due south runs parallel to the A6 and leads to Emmeloord. Taking the Lemsterweg north leads to Lemmer, and also provides access to Rutten.

Bant has no railway station. The nearest stations are Kampen railway station in Kampen, Steenwijk railway station in Steenwijk and Lelystad Centrum railway station in Lelystad.

Bant is, however, connected by bus. The following bus line services Bant:

Line	Route	Transporter
315	Groningen - Heerenveen - Joure - Lemmer - Bant - Emmeloord	Arriva
