= Nagele =

- Village
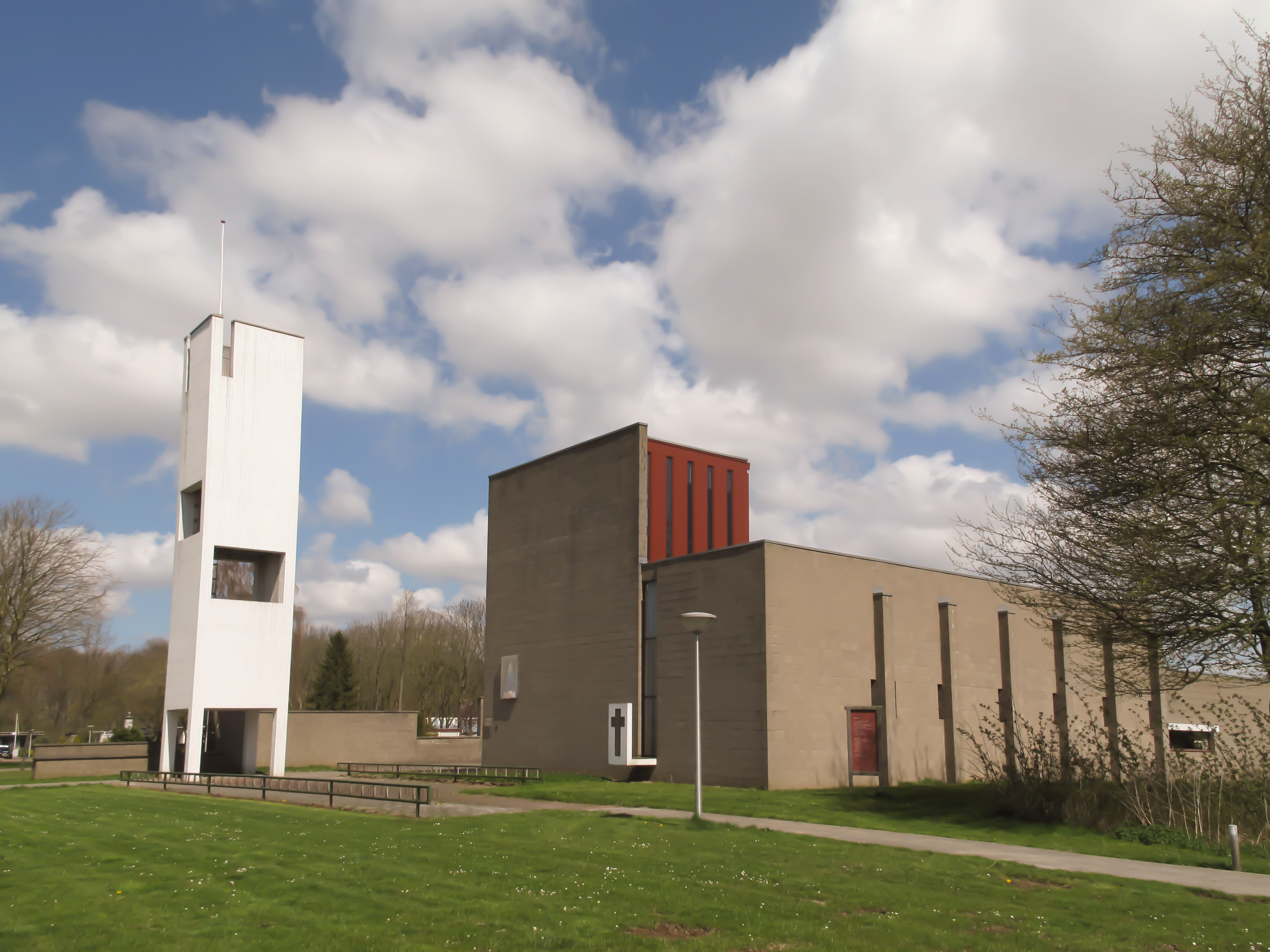
- Nagele, church: de Samen op Wegkerk

- Flag Coat of arms

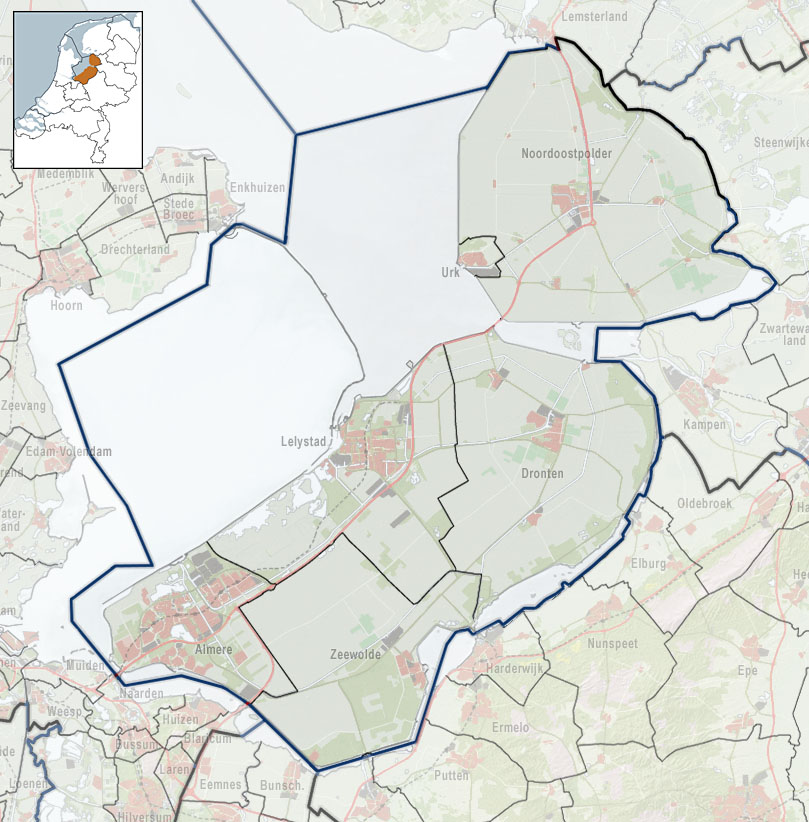
- Location of Nagele in the province of Flevoland
- Coordinates: 52°38′38″N 5°43′24″E
- Country: Netherlands
- Province: Flevoland
- Municipality: Noordoostpolder
- Established: 1954

Area
  - Total: 50.39 km^{2} (19.46 sq mi)
- Elevation: −3.2 m (−10 ft)

Population (2021)
  - Total: 1,940
  - Density: 38.5/km^{2} (99.7/sq mi)
- Time zone: UTC+1 (CET)
  - Summer (DST): UTC+2 (CEST)
- Postal code: 8308
- Dialing code: 0527

Nagele is a village in the Dutch province of Flevoland. It is a part of the municipality of Noordoostpolder, and lies about 10 km south of Emmeloord.

== History ==
Nagele was designed by the architectural team "De 8" between 1948 and 1954. The final design by Aldo van Eyck and de 8 was shown at the CIAM 8 meeting in 1956. While the current condition of the town differs from the original design, some of the basic concepts remain.

The village was founded in 1954 after an island in the Zuiderzee which used be located between Urk and Schokland. The etymology is unknown, however a river called Nakala was recorded in 966 near Urk.

The organization of the Noordoostpolder area was based on a central nucleus with smaller towns circling around connected by roads back to the center. Nagele was proposed to be southwest of the main town, and was originally to be planned to contain 300 dwelling units, 3 churches, 3 primary schools, a post office, fire station, hotel, cafes, a clinic, cemetery, sports field, swimming pool and business zone. Aldo van Eyck proposed that the town be designed around 3 principles: 1. a non-hierarchical organization with mixed social groups, 2. a windbreak of trees to give the village a spatial character and stand out in the polder landscape, and 3. an open green center. The final design accepted by the Wieringermeer board included these ideas, which can still be seen today. The dwelling units form smaller courtyards that are shared around the outside of the main green, these clusters in turn forming the visual boundaries of the center.

== Public transportation ==
There is no railway station in Nagele, but the nearest stations are in Kampen and Lelystad. There is a bus stop which takes passengers to cities and villages nearby, such as Emmeloord and Lelystad.

== Gallery ==
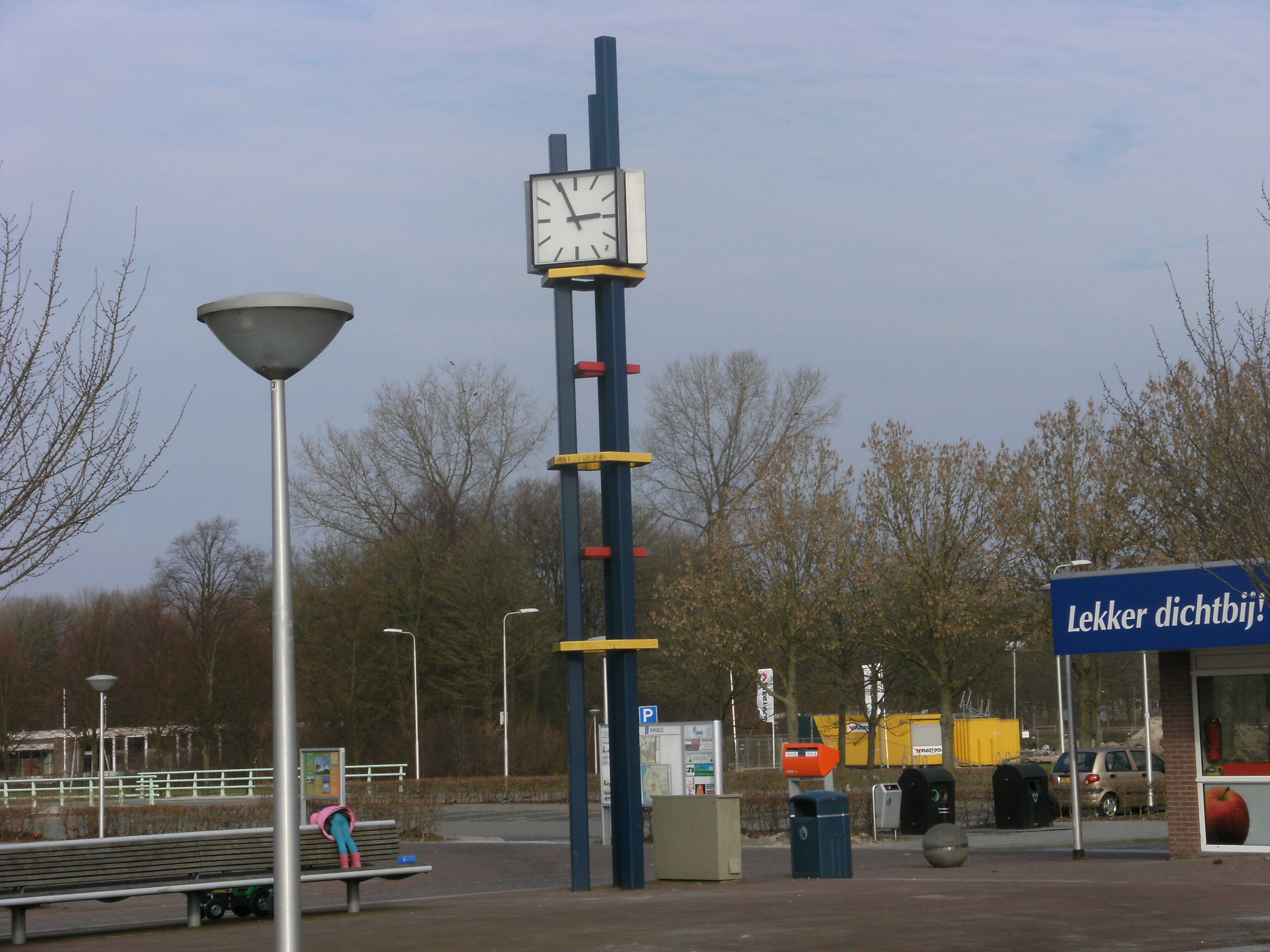
Square in Nagele

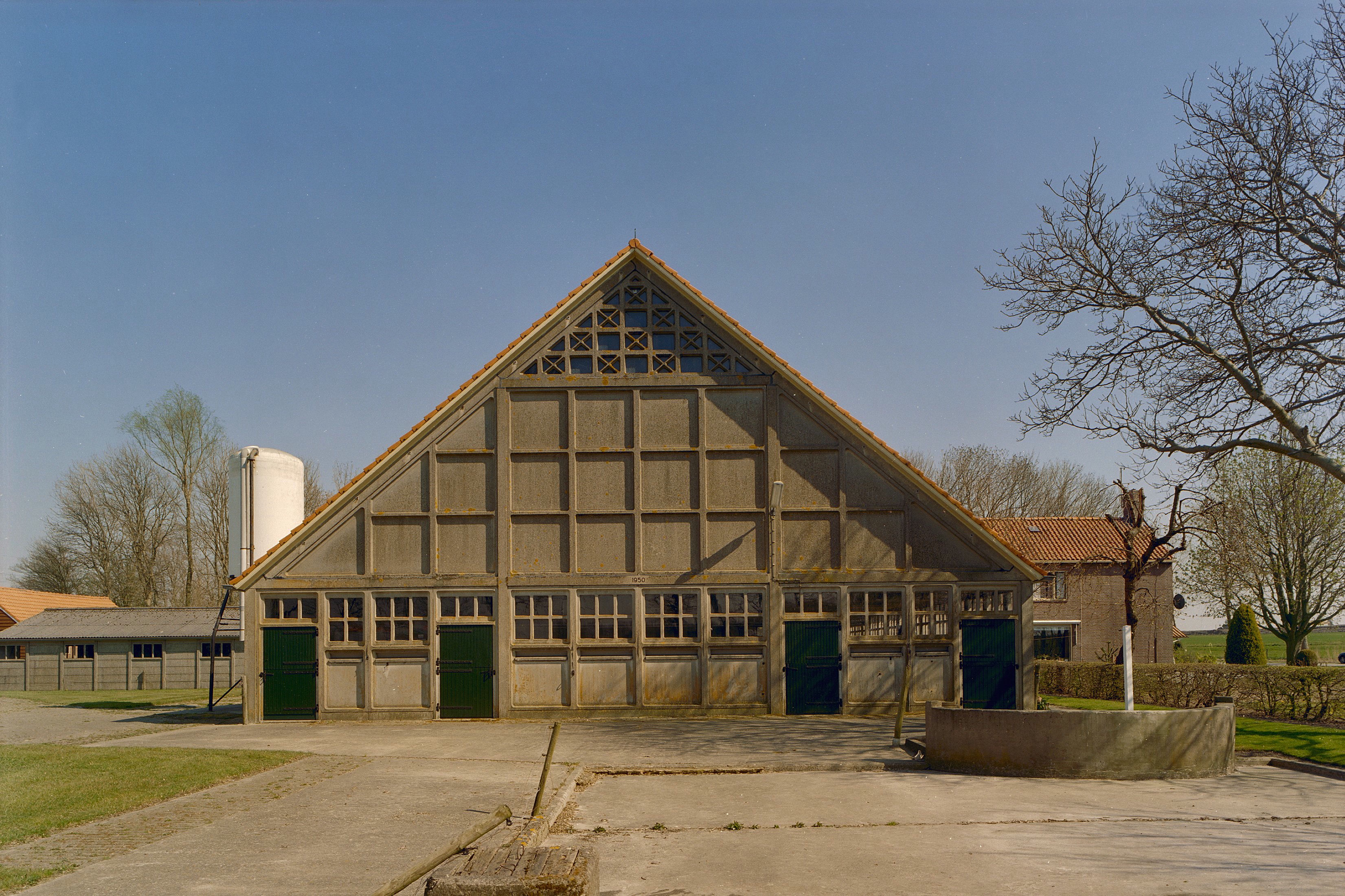
Barn in Nagele

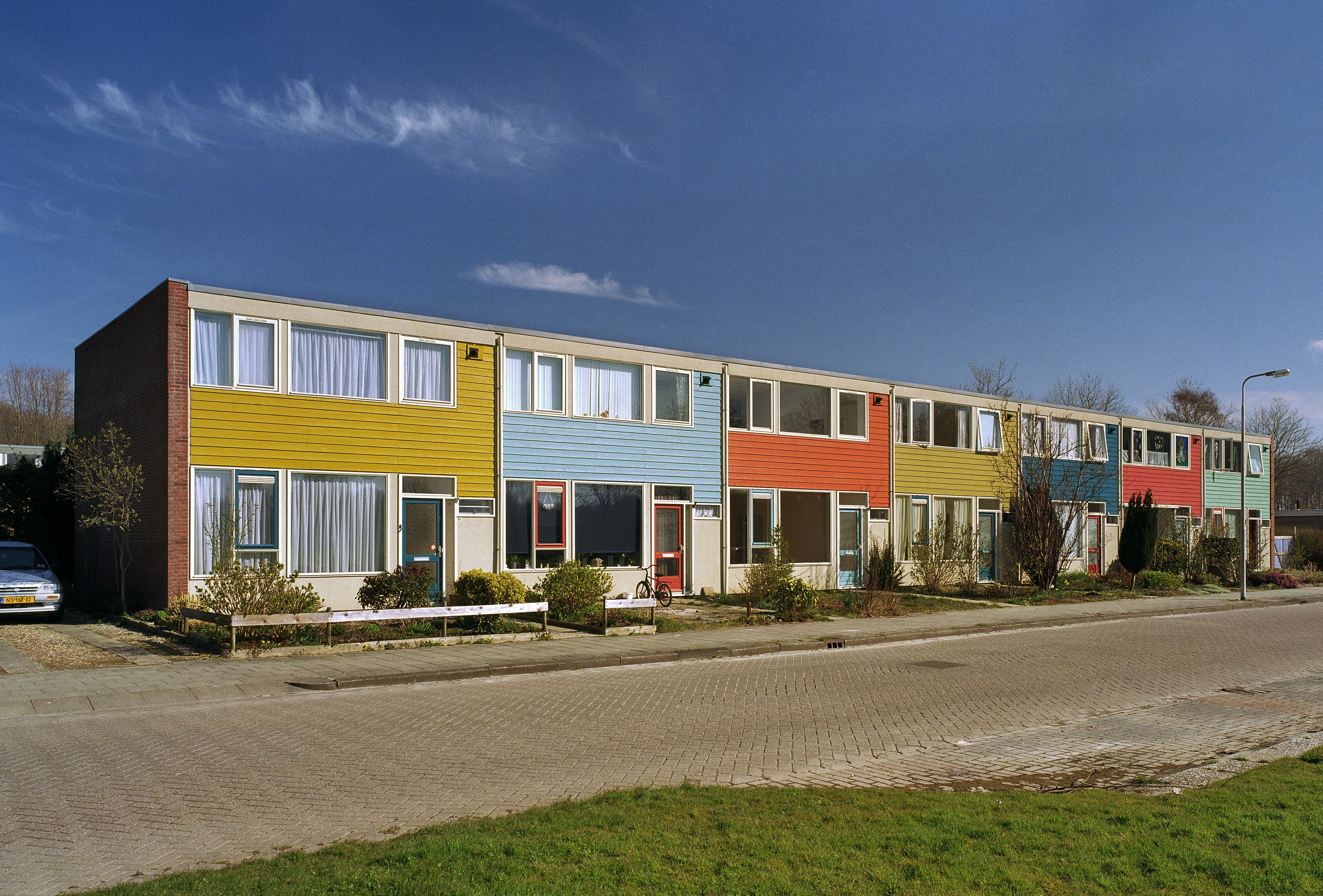
Street

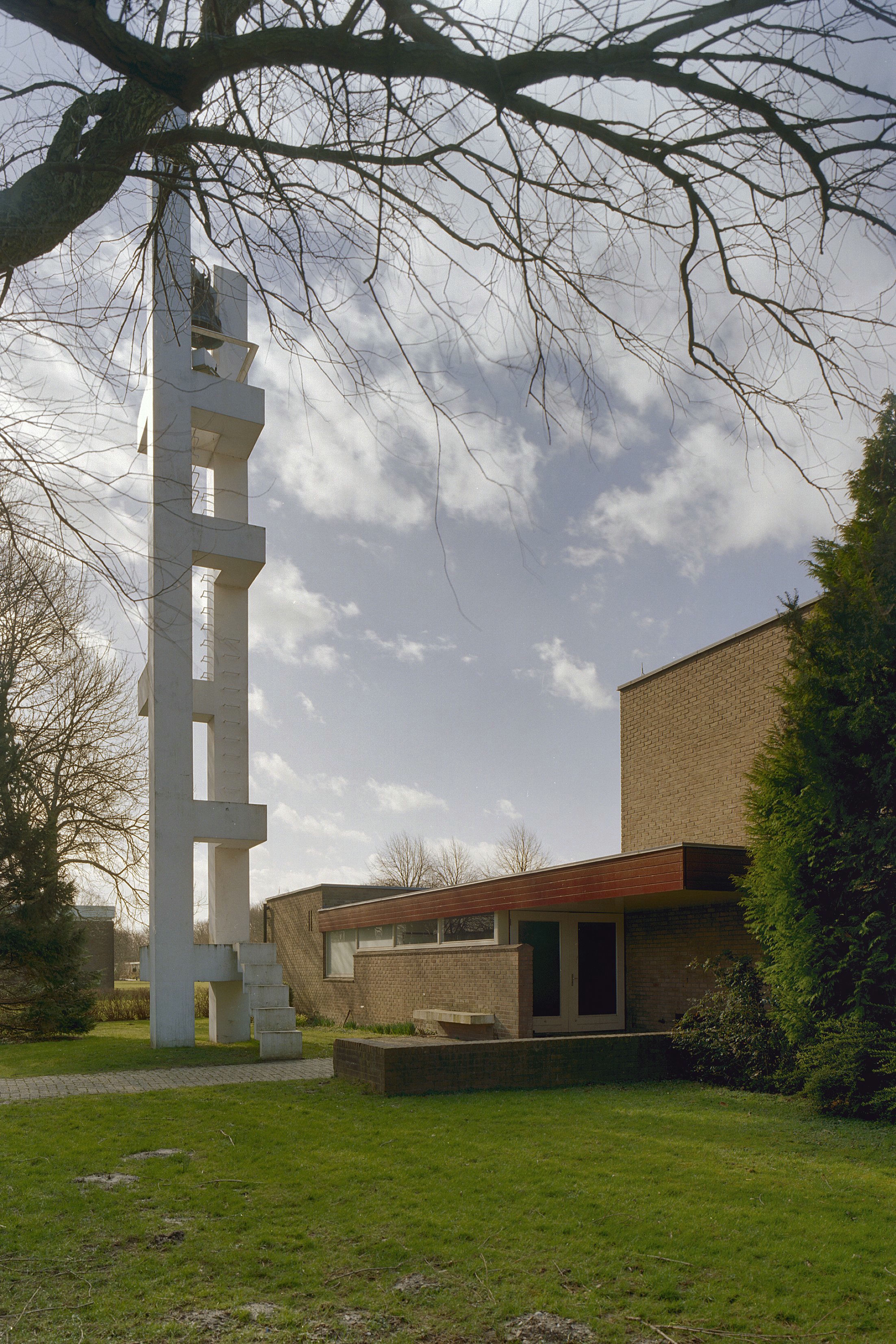
Bell tower of church
