= Rutten, Netherlands =

Rutten
- Village
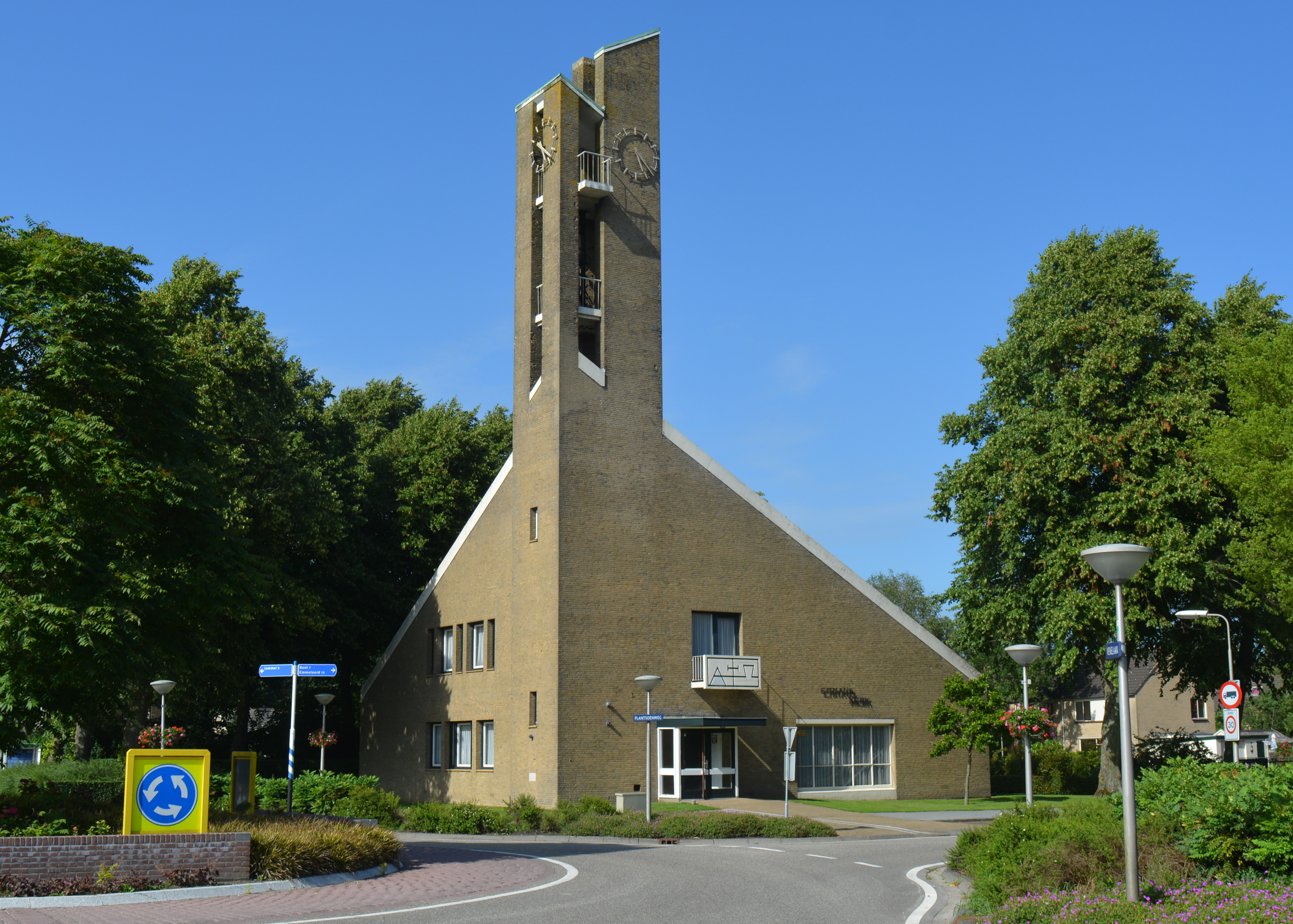
- Emmaüs Church in Rutten

- Flag

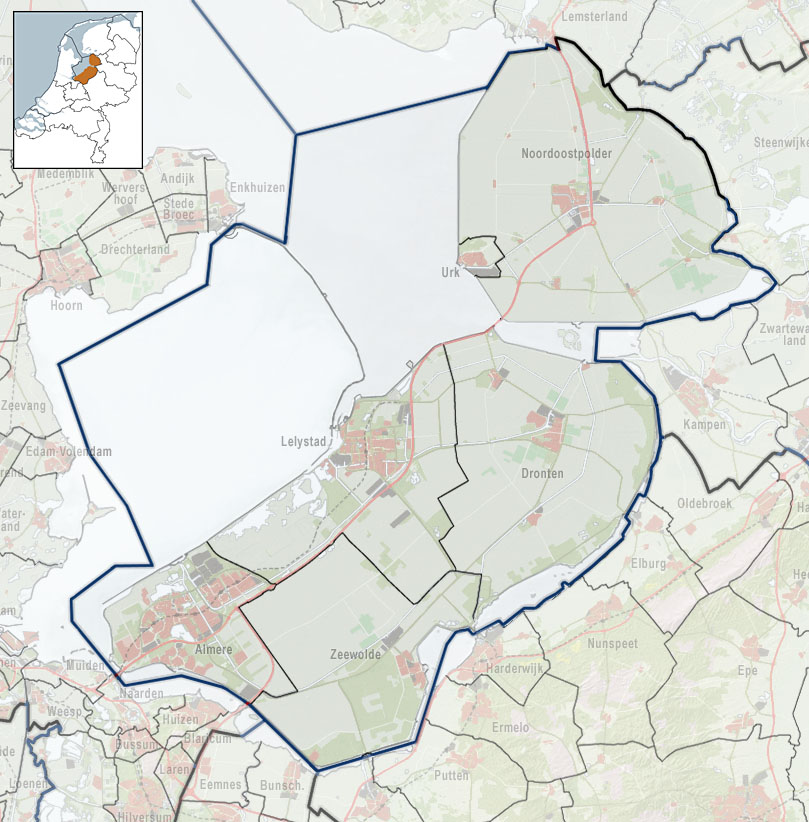
- Location of Luttelgeest in the province of Flevoland Rutten (Netherlands)
- Coordinates: 52°48′N 5°41′E
- Country: Netherlands
- Province: Flevoland
- Municipality: Noordoostpolder
- Founded: 1952

Area
  - Total: 43.79 km^{2} (16.91 sq mi)
- Elevation: −3.8 m (−12 ft)

Population (2021)
  - Total: 1,655
  - Density: 37.79/km^{2} (97.89/sq mi)
- Time zone: UTC+1 (CET)
  - Summer (DST): UTC+2 (CEST)
- Postal code: 8313
- Dialing code: 0527

Rutten is a village in the central Netherlands. It is located in Noordoostpolder, Flevoland, about 8 km northwest of Emmeloord. It was founded in 1952.

== History ==
In order to create the Noordoostpolder, sluices and pumping stations had to be built. Preliminary work began in 1936. The pumping station Buma was constructed between 1939 and 1941, and is one of the three original pumping stations for the polder. Buma is a fire and bomb proof building which contains three pumps. Each pump can move 550 cubic metres (19,000 cu ft) of water per minute. The Lemstersluis which is often called Frisian sluice was completed on 10 November 1940 and is located next to the pumping house. The sluice can move ships up to 6 metres (20 ft).

The plan for the village was approved in 1952, and construction started the same year. It has been laid out around a square. The village was named after the drowned village of Rutten, a church village near Nagele. The village was designed for a 1,000 people, but has already surpassed that.

== Sports ==
Rutten has an amateur soccer club called Rutten Komt Op (RKO), a tennis club called TCR, a volleyball club called Rutten '88, a cue sports club, rowing sports teams, a Motor Club called MC NOP, and an ice skate club called STC Rutten.

== Gallery ==
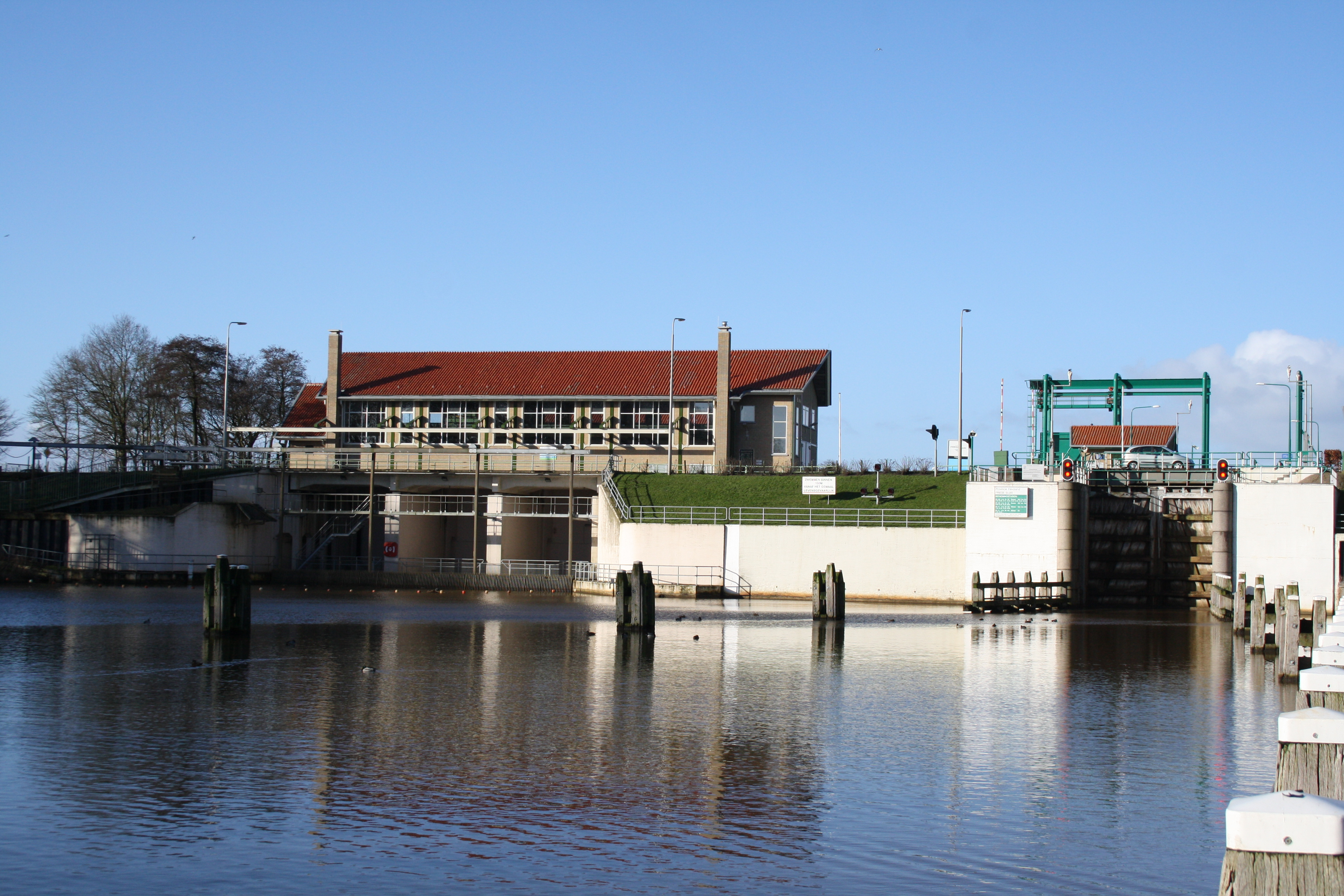
Pumping station Buma

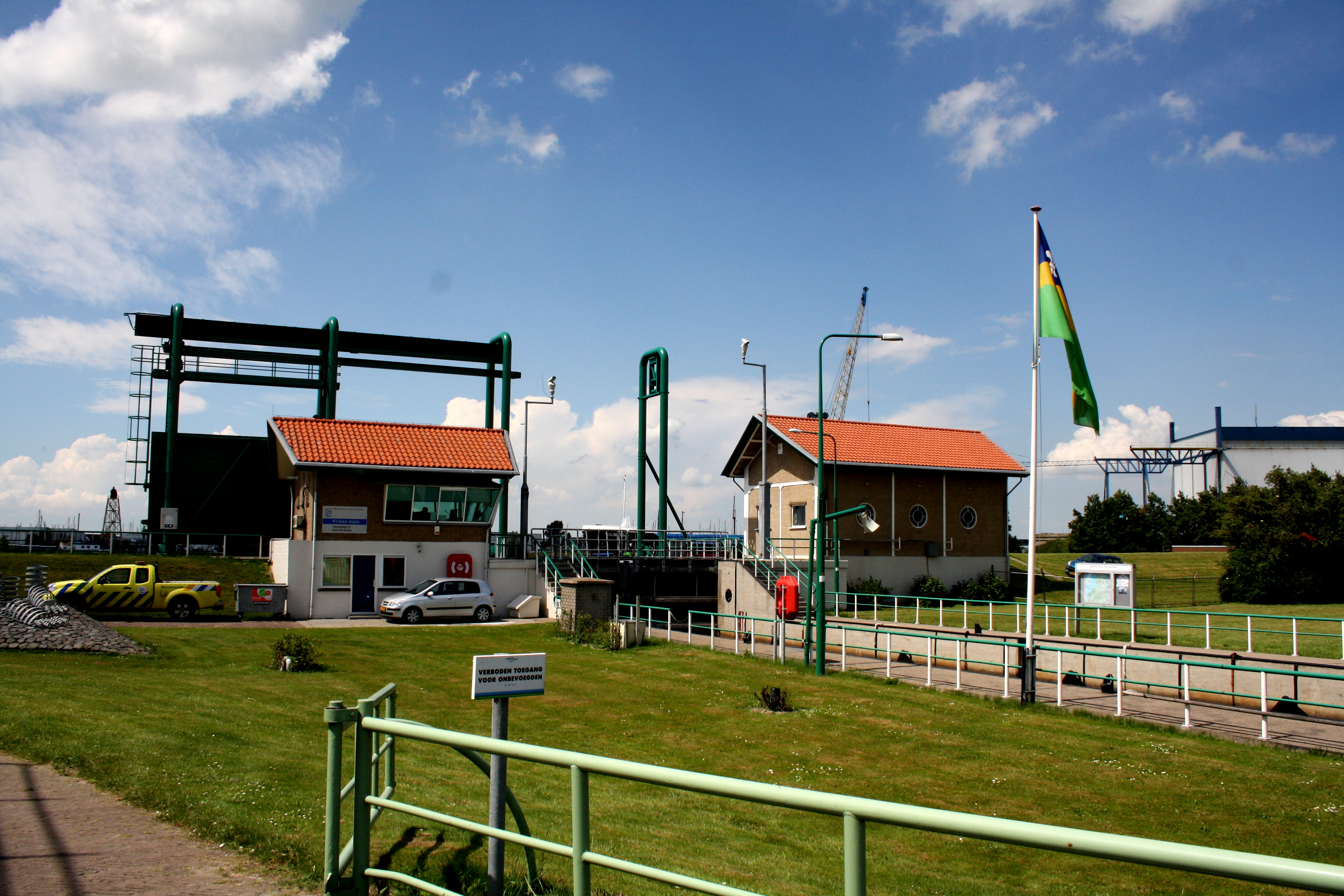
The Frisian sluice

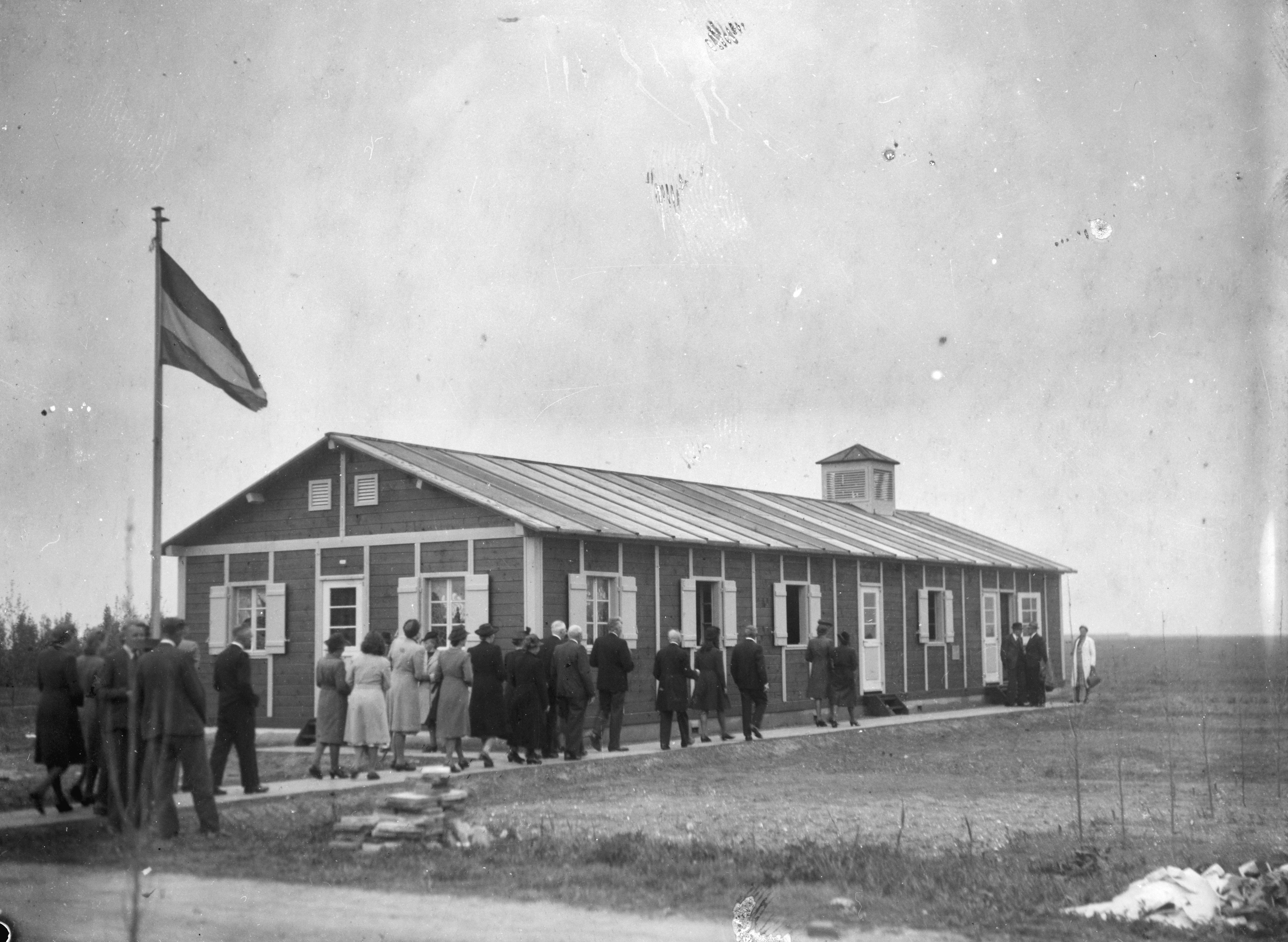
Temporary church. Moved to Rutten in 1953

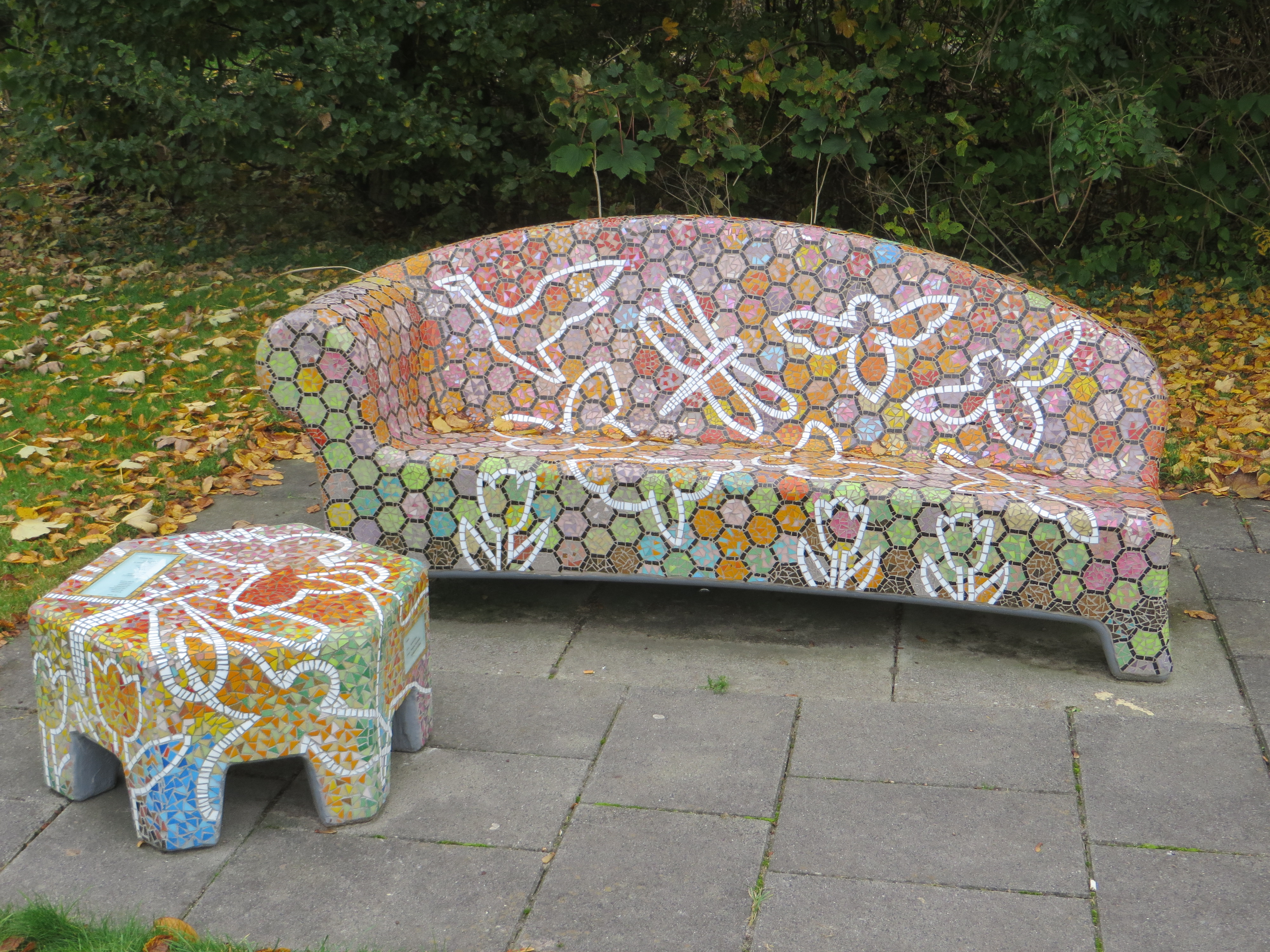
Social sofa
