= Draeck =

Draeck may refer to:

== Places ==
- Vergulde Draeck

== People ==
- Willem Draeck, Lord of Merksem (died 1525), Mayor of Antwerp

== See also ==
- De Groene Draeck
- Gulden Draak
- Hotel de Draak
- Joris en de Draak
