= Fort de Roovere =

Fort in The Netherlands

Coordinates: 51°31′44″N 4°18′04″E

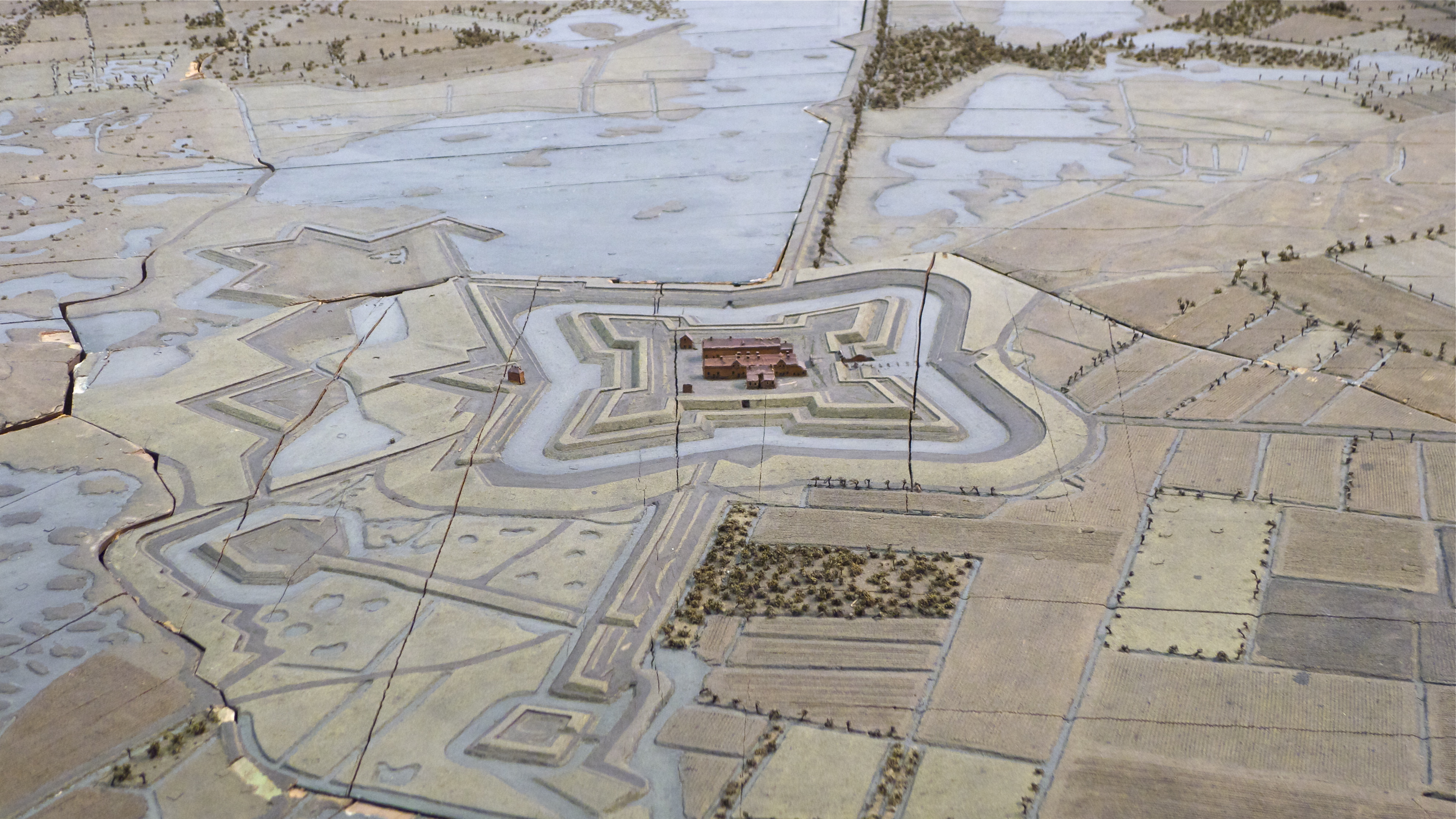
Model in 1:600 scale of the Fort de Roovere in 1751

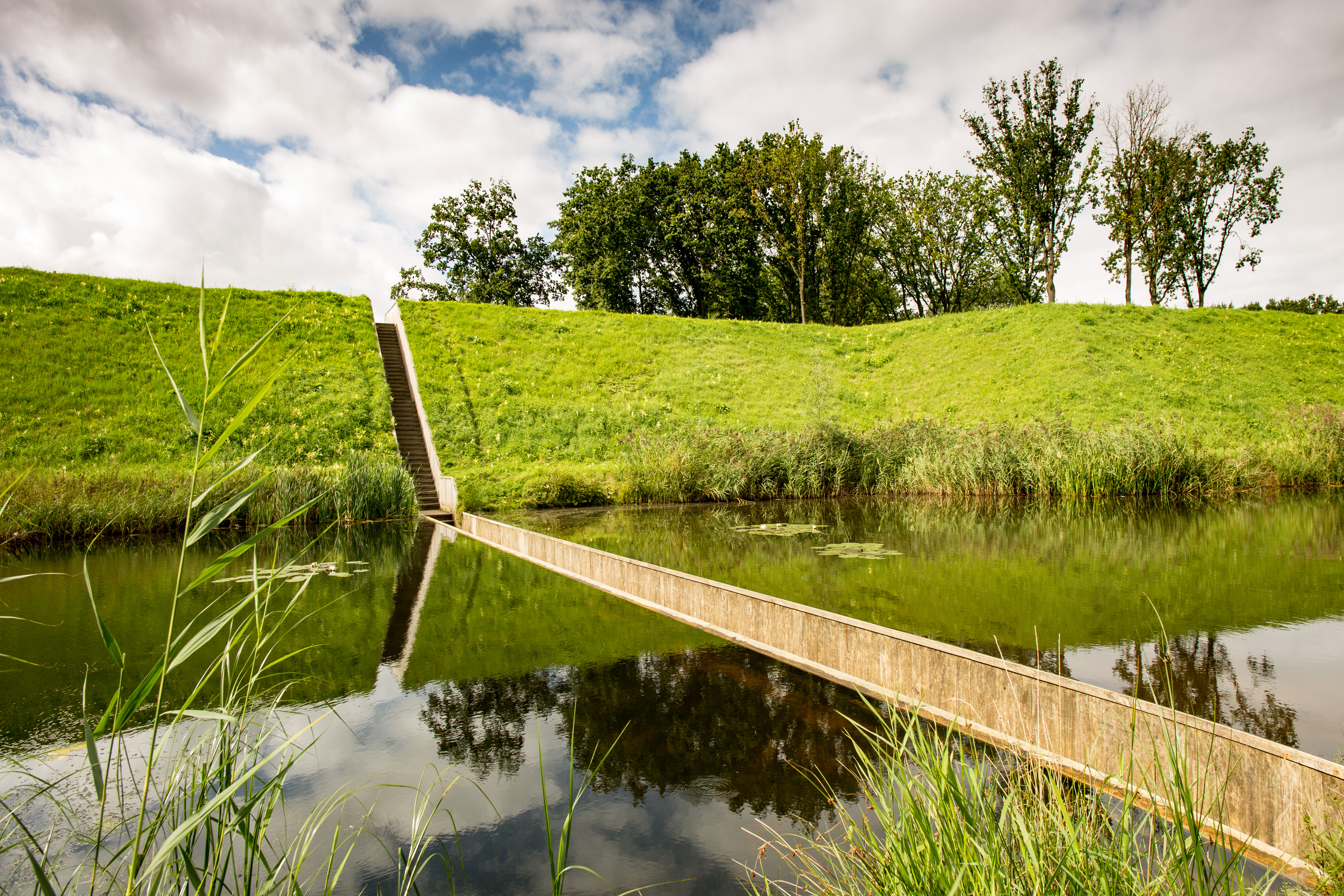
The Moses Bridge or Loopgraafbrug (Trench Bridge)

Fort De Roovere is an earthen fort, constructed as part of the Dutch Water Line, (Hollandse Waterlinie), a series of water-based defences conceived by Maurice of Nassau in 1628 during the Eighty Years War where it defended against Spanish attackers. It is located near Halsteren.

In 1747, during the Austrian War of Succession (1740–1748) the fort was under siege by the French. This siege has been extensively documented. Eventually, the fortress Bergen op Zoom fell and the siege was abandoned.

During the Napoleonic Wars Bergen op Zoom was besieged again, this time by the English as they chased the French back to their homeland. During this time the Fort de Roovere seems to have received some upkeep but was not attacked. After the end of this conflict the fort was abandoned.

The fort is open from the 'back', and the 'front' consists of two bastions. Until the renovation in 2010 the fort's moat was dry and the surrounding area and banks were overgrown with trees.

== Renovation ==
Over the years the de Roovere fort had fallen into major disrepair, but a foundation has now been established, "Friends of Fort de Roovere", whose goal is to make sure the fort is not forgotten.

In mid 2010, extensive renovation of the fort began with the removal of the undergrowth and a deepening of the old moat so that the fort could be more easily recognizable as such. In addition, a novel bridge was designed by RO&AD Architecten in Halsteren, The Netherlands. To access the fort without disrupting its original design, and because the idea of a bridge crossing the moat seemed disrespectful, RO&AD conceived an unusual partially submerged bridge. The structure has taken on the name "The Moses Bridge", as it appears to divide the moat's waters. RO&AD Architecten also designed a watchtower named Pompejus on the site that doubles as seating for an open-air theater.

The clearing of the area led to many local protests. Little to no interest was paid to archeological research as there should be traces of the French siege nearby. Local amateurs with metal detectors still regularly find cannonballs there, which likely originated from the siege.

The improvements include recreational functions, and the site contains several routes for cycling and hiking.
