= Crusio =

Crusio may refer to:

- Crusio (ice cream parlor)
- Wim Crusio, a Dutch behavioral neurogeneticist
