= Lemmer =

Lemmer De Lemmer (West Frisian)
- Town
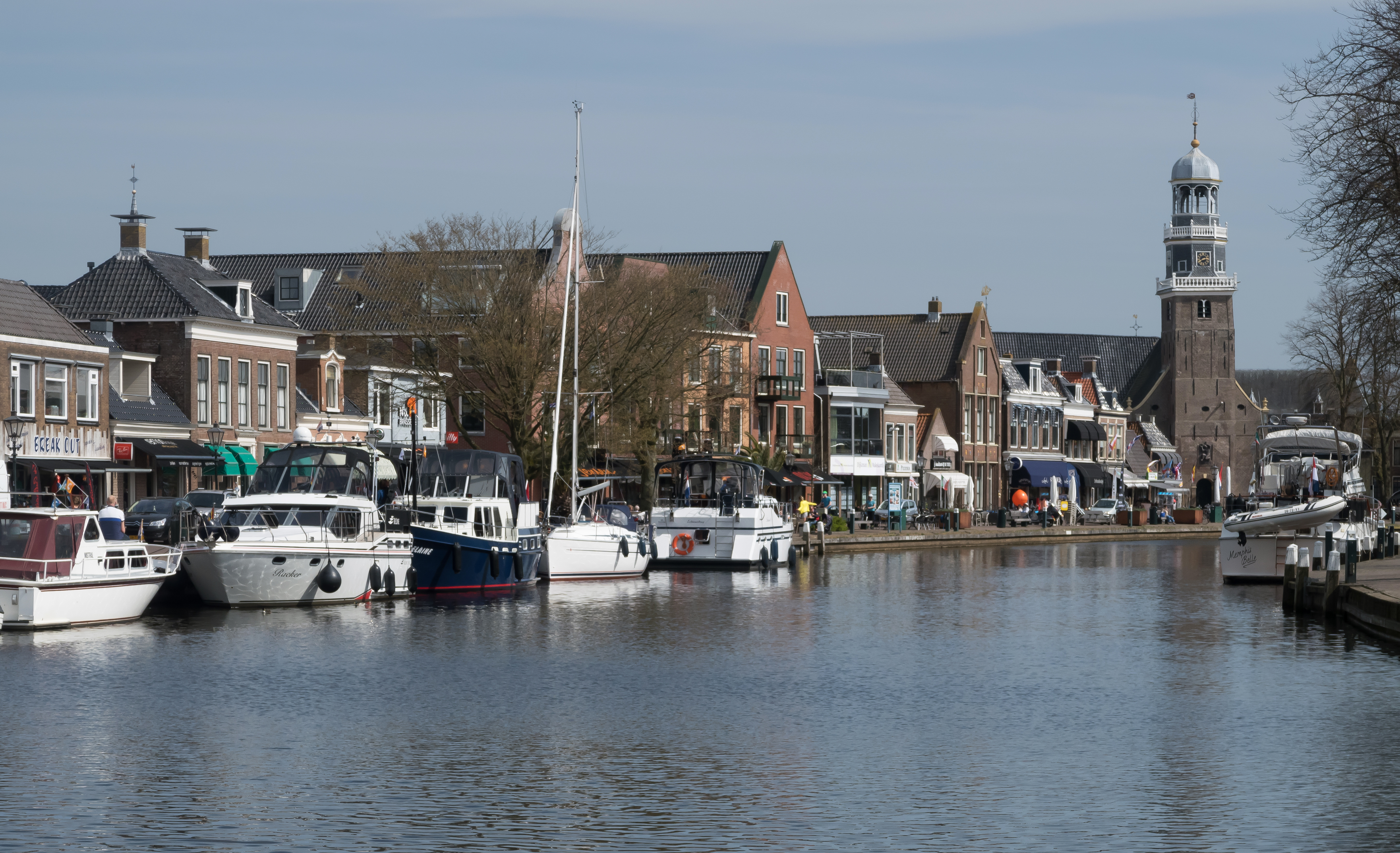
- The Kortestreek with the Reformed church

- Coat of arms

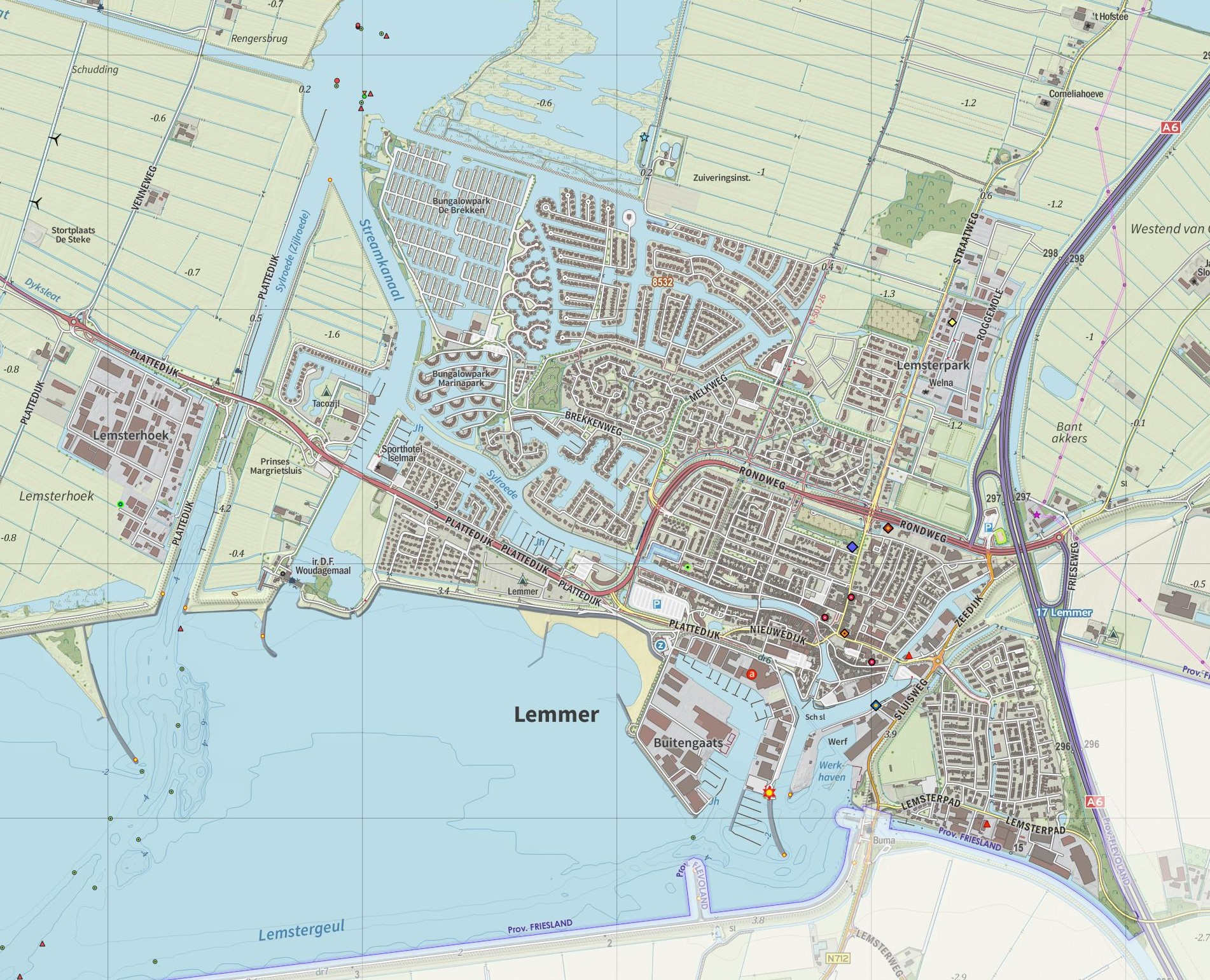
- Map of Lemmer

- Location in the Netherlands
- Country: Netherlands
- Province: Friesland
- Municipality: De Fryske Marren

Population (2017)
  - Total: 10,225
- Time zone: UTC+1 (CET)
  - Summer (DST): UTC+2 (CEST)
- Postal code: 8530-8532
- Telephone area: 0514

Lemmer (West Frisian: De Lemmer) is a town in the municipality of De Fryske Marren, in the Dutch province of Friesland. Lemmer lies adjacent to the IJsselmeer and the Frisian Lakes and is one of Friesland's best-known surface water sports locations. Lemmer is a bustling lakeside resort in the summer months and attracts not only day-trippers from surrounding communities such as Emmeloord, Urk, and Joure, but also national and international tourists.

In 2017 the town had 10,225 inhabitants. Residents of Lemmer are called Lemsters. Due to its favorable location in relation to the Randstad, Lemmer attracts many new inhabitants from outside Friesland. As a result, the village has suffered little from the effects of rural flight. The hamlet of Brekkenpolder also belongs to the town, along with most of the hamlet of Tacozijl and a small part of the hamlet of Westend.

== History ==
The original Lemsters settled where the rivers Rien and Zijlroede meet, though it remains unknown when they first did so. Lemmer appears in writing at the beginning of the fourteenth century, though it is mentioned as Lenna in the writings of the bishop of the diocese of Utrecht in 1228. A further link can probably be made with the name Lammerbroeke, which appears in 1165 as an earlier form of Lemsterhoek, a hamlet just west of present-day Lemmer, which was destroyed by the Hollanders around 1400. No rebuilding ensued, but the place and name are still known, especially among sailors and fishermen. Even older names have also survived, such as Lyamer.

Gradually, a settlement grew at the mouth of these inland waterways of the Zuiderzee, a prime place for merchants and artisans.

Lemmer was in a vulnerable position on the Zuiderzee and often fell under the influence of Holland. That happened in 1197, among other times, when Count William I had a castle built in Oosterzee to aid in his subjugation of the lord of Kuinre. In 1422, a castle was built in Lemmer by Duke John III of Bavaria-Straubing, who had been summoned by the Schieringers as patron of Friesland. Known as John "the Pitiless", he certainly would not have been a popular figure in Lemmer.

Duke Charles II of Guelders also interfered with Friesland. He had a blockhouse built in Lemmer in 1521, which housed a garrison. Two years later he handed it over to the Burgundians. What the castles and blockhouse looked like is unknown.

The Spaniards did not leave the village alone either. In 1581, during the Eighty Years' War, they conquered Lemmer, along with the city of Sloten. In the rampjaar of 1672, however, Prince-Bishop von Galen of Münster proved unable to occupy Lemmer as part of the Franco-Dutch War.

In 1799, British troops landed in Lemmer. The War of the Second Coalition had broken out between Great Britain and France, and the Dutch had become involved as "sister republic". British warships sailed the Zuiderzee and the cities of Enkhuizen, Medemblik and Stavoren were occupied. Soon afterwards, the large warships could be seen in Lemmer. The Lemster beurtman, with whom the enterprising Poppe Jans had made many a trip to Amsterdam, was overpowered near Urk and its passengers taken to Stavoren. Two British warships appeared in front of the port of Lemmer on 24 September. Captain James Boorder landed in a sloop - under cover of a white flag - to meet local authorities. A sudden storm forced him to spend the night at De Wildeman Inn. Three days later, he returned and claimed Lemmer for the British, including all ships and cargo. If refused, all of Lemmer would be shot to pieces.

Lemmer rejected their demand fearlessly. It had since been reinforced by 500 armed farmers from Het Bildt, who brought field guns with them. But the town could not withstand the fire of British fourteen, sixteen and eighteen-pound shots. An hour and a half after the attack was started, the flag was raised on the church tower as a sign of surrender. In various places in Friesland, patriots called for civilians and soldiers to liberate Lemmer. On 7 October, there were still 260 soldiers and marines in the town. To prevent an attack by water, they had used chains to block waterways.

Lemmer eventually became one of the most important fishing towns in the Netherlands, thanks in part to its fleet of 146 vessels. With the completion of the Zuiderzee Works between 1924 and 1968, fishery declined incrementally. Lemmer offers a central position in southern Friesland and northern Flevoland. Every year there is the Lemsterweek, a week of cultural events attracting around 85,000 people annually. The Lemsteraak, a traditional sailing ship, originates in Lemmer. De Groene Draeck, the royal yacht of Princess Beatrix, is a notable example of a Lemsteraak.

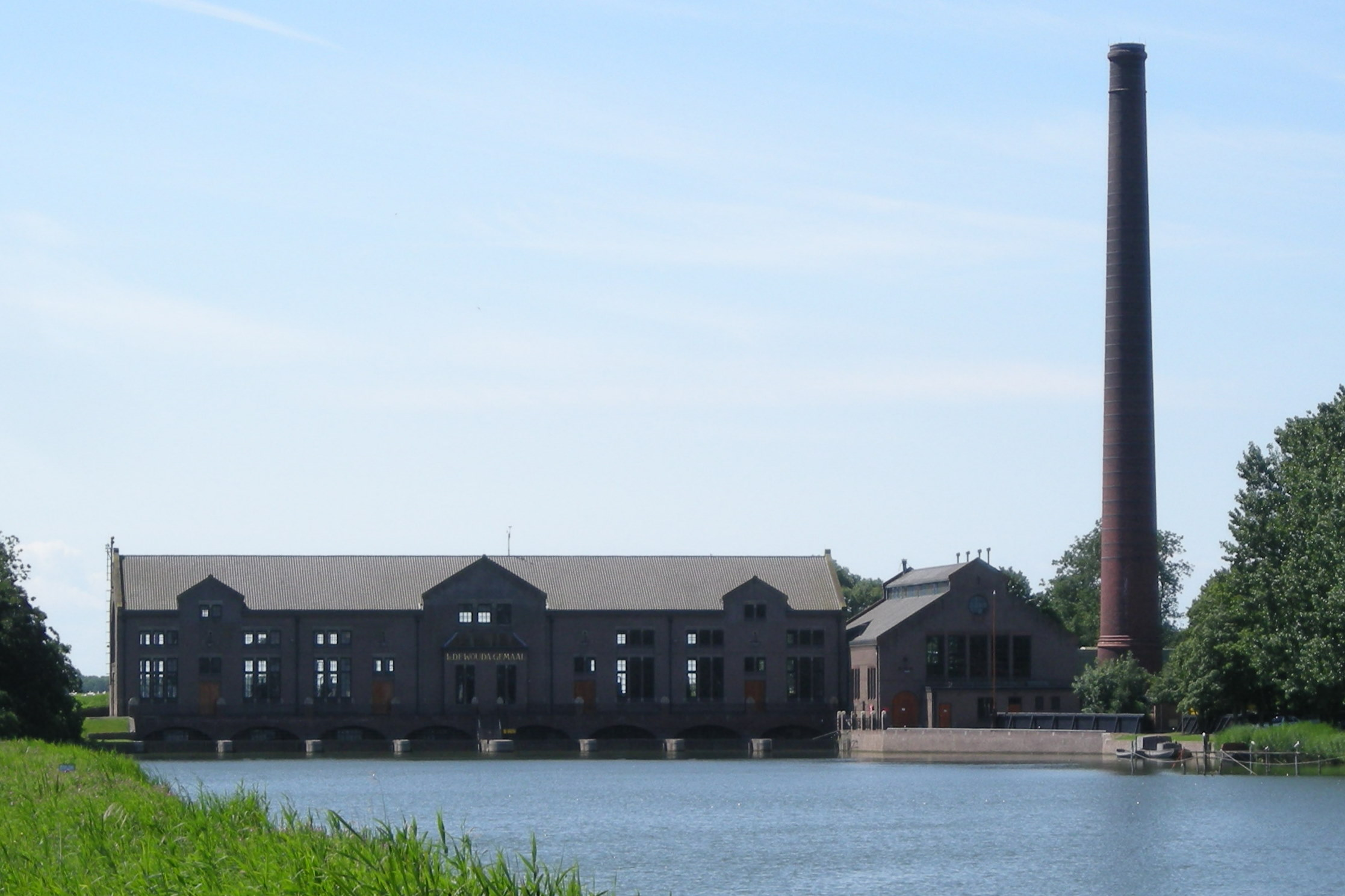
Wouda pumping station

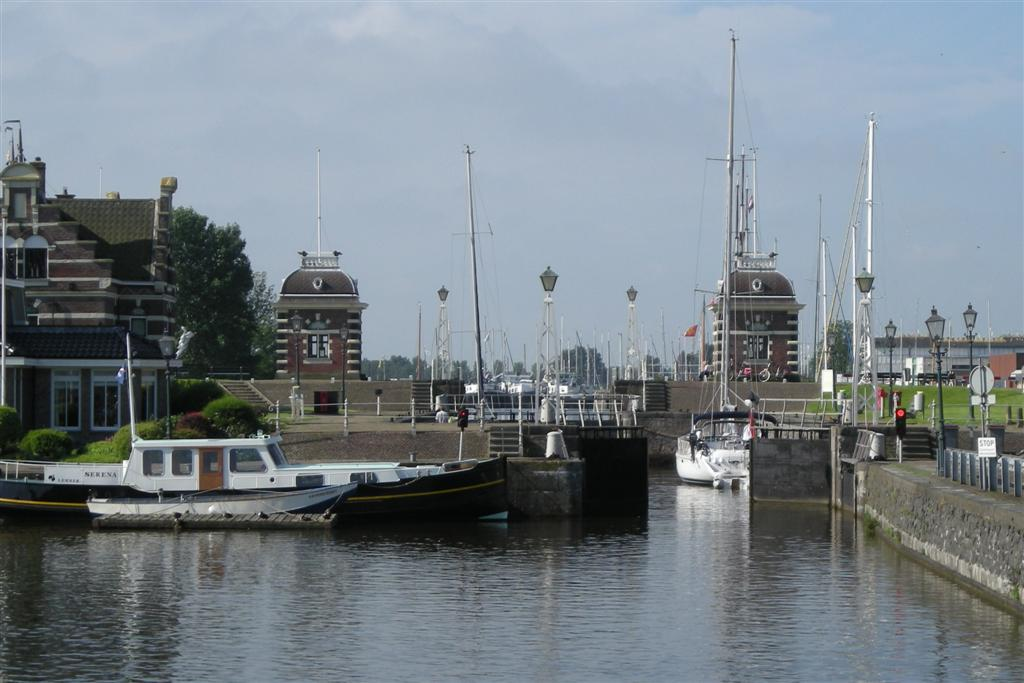
Lemstersluis, a drop lock

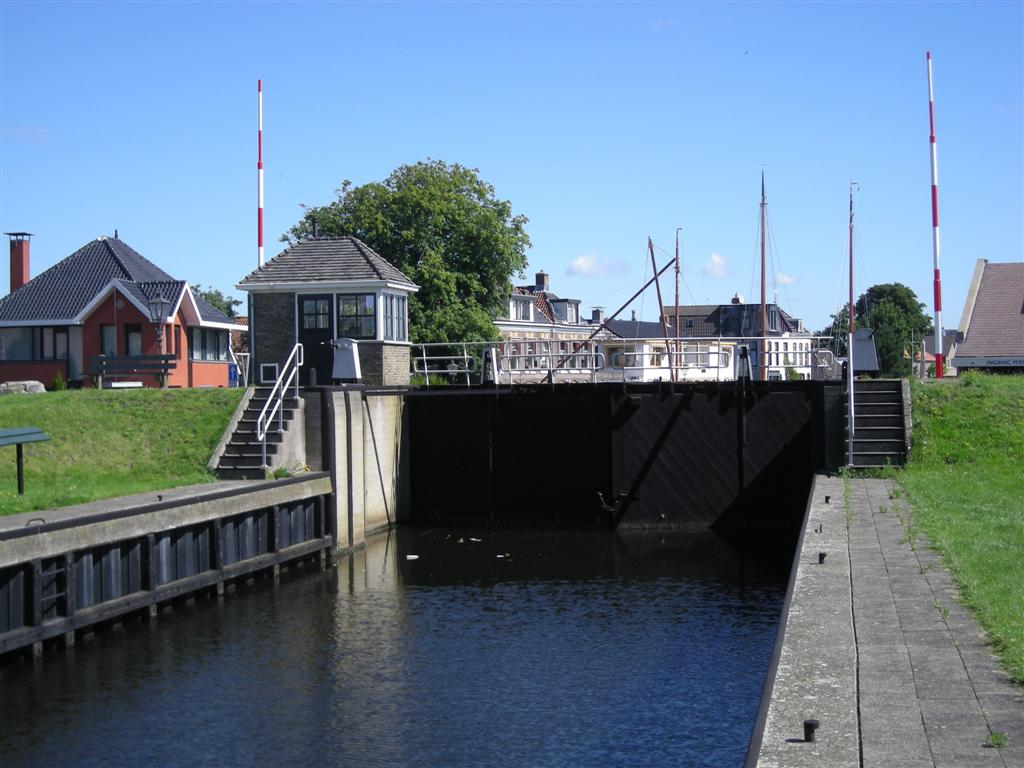
Riensluis, a control lock

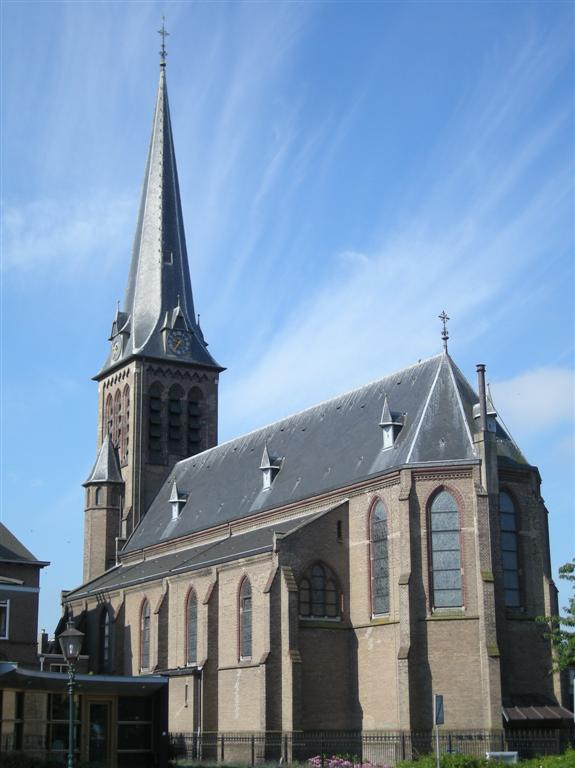
Saint Willibrord church

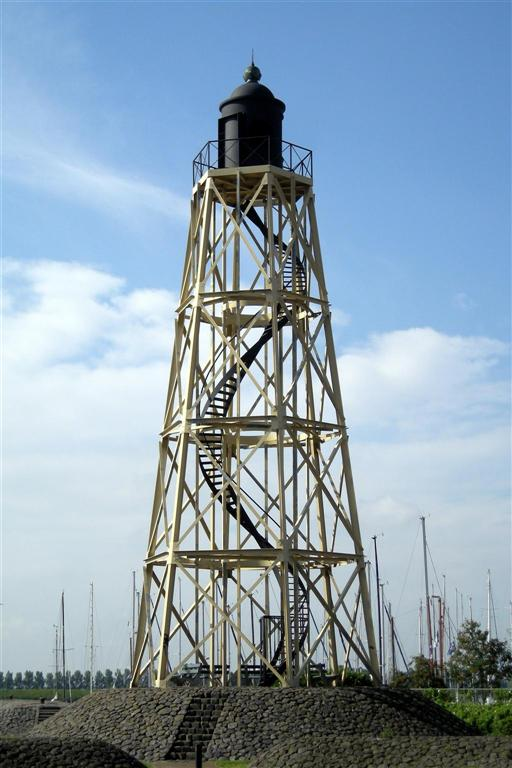
Lighthouse of Lemmer

== Notable people ==
- Tjaard van Andringa de Kempenaer (1806–1870), politician
- Hendrik van Rijgersma (1835–1877), physician and botanist
- Aaltje Visser (1851–1871), in 1868 became first female pharmacist in the Netherlands
- Sietze Douwes van Veen (1856–1924), theologian
- Rienk van Veen (1865–1929), politician
- Roelof Klein (1877–1960), rower
- Jan Pen (1921–2010), economist and author
- Pieter Verhoeff (1938–2019), film director
- Rinze Visser (born 1938), politician
- Sybe Schaap (born 1946), politician
- Rintje Ritsma (born 1970), speed skater
- Wieteke Cramer (born 1981), speed skater
- Patrick Lip (born 1984), football player
- Epke Zonderland (born 1986), gymnast
