= Pen's parade =

Pen's Parade or The Income Parade is a concept described in a 1971 book published by Dutch economist Jan Pen describing income distribution. The parade is defined as a succession of every person in the economy, with their height proportional to their income, and ordered from lowest to greatest. People with average income would be of average height, and so would the spectator. Pen's description of what the spectator would see is a parade of dwarves, and then some unbelievable giants at the very end.

The original context of the parade is the United Kingdom, and the duration is one hour. The parade is used by economists as a graphical representation of income inequality because it is a form of quantile function and it is considered useful when comparing two different areas or periods.

== Summary of events ==
- At the beginning of the parade, the marchers cannot be seen at all because they represent businesses with losses.
- Very soon, upright marchers with positive income begin to pass by, but they are very tiny.
- Ten minutes in, the full-time labor force has arrived and it lasts several minutes.
- By about halfway through the parade, the observers might expect to be looking people in the eye—people of average height ought to be in the middle, but the marchers are still quite small
- About forty-five minutes—the parade the marchers are as tall as the observers.
- In the final six minutes, however, when people with earnings in the top 10 percent begin to arrive, with heights increasing fast. Doctors, lawyers, and senior civil servants are about 20 feet tall, and later, successful corporate executives, bankers, stockbrokers—peering down from fifty feet, 100 feet, 500 feet.
- In the last few seconds there's a glimpse of pop stars, movie stars and the most successful entrepreneurs, and the observer can see only up to their knees.
- At the very end of the parade, in the original book, is John Paul Getty. The sole of his shoe is hundreds of feet thick.

== See also ==
- Gini coefficient
- Atkinson index
