= Bob van Luijt =

Dutch entrepreneur and technologist

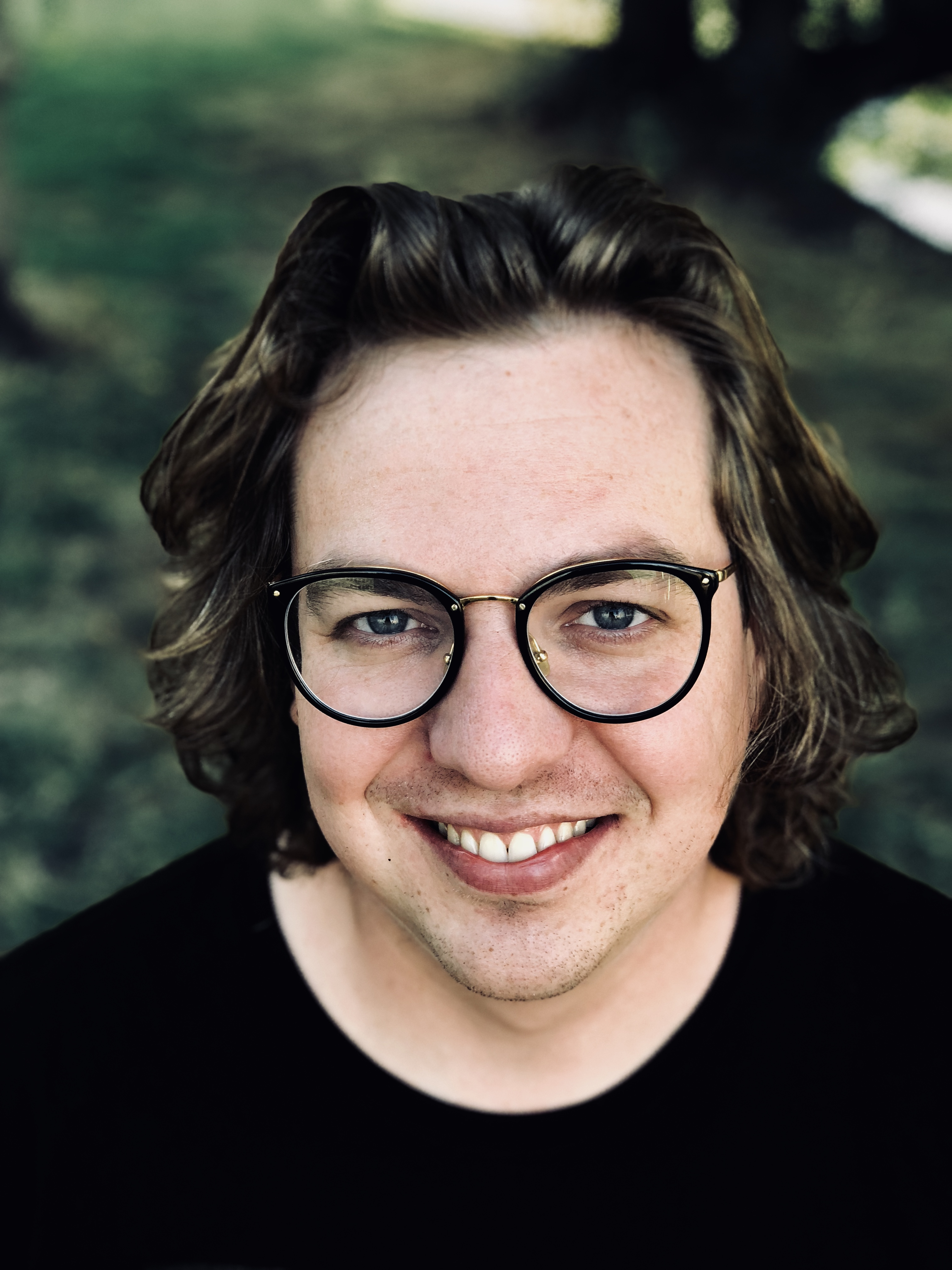
- Bob van Luijt in 2018
- Born: November 15, 1985 (age 40); Bergen op Zoom, Netherlands
- Other name: BMH
- Citizenship: Dutch
- Education: Artez Institute of the Arts; Berklee College of Music; Harvard Business School
- Alma mater: Artez Institute of the Arts
- Occupations: Entrepreneur; technologist; Angel investor
- Organization: Weaviate
- Known for: Weaviate; Vector databases; Control(human, data, sound)
- Title: Founder and CEO, Weaviate
- Website: txt.vanluijt.nl

Bob van Luijt (born November 15, 1985), is a Dutch technology entrepreneur, technologist, and angel investor. He is the co-founder and CEO of Weaviate, an open-source vector database.

Van Luijt’s work focuses on the intersection of language, music, and digital infrastructure. He has argued that software development is a form of linguistic articulation, a theme explored in his 2021 TEDx talk regarding the relationship between digital technology and language. Under his leadership, Weaviate has become a central component of the AI infrastructure stack, securing significant venture capital from prominent technology investment firms.

== Early life and education ==
Born in Bergen op Zoom, Van Luijt pursued studies in jazz and electronic composition. He received a bachelor's degree from the Artez Institute of the Arts. He subsequently moved to the United States to continue his studies at the Berklee College of Music, supported by a VSBfonds scholarship and the Berklee World Scholarship.

Van Luijt has cited his musical background as a primary influence on his approach to software architecture, specifically the concepts of structure and "hacker mindset" common to both jazz improvisation and coding. He later completed executive education at Harvard Business School.

== Technology Entrepreneurship ==
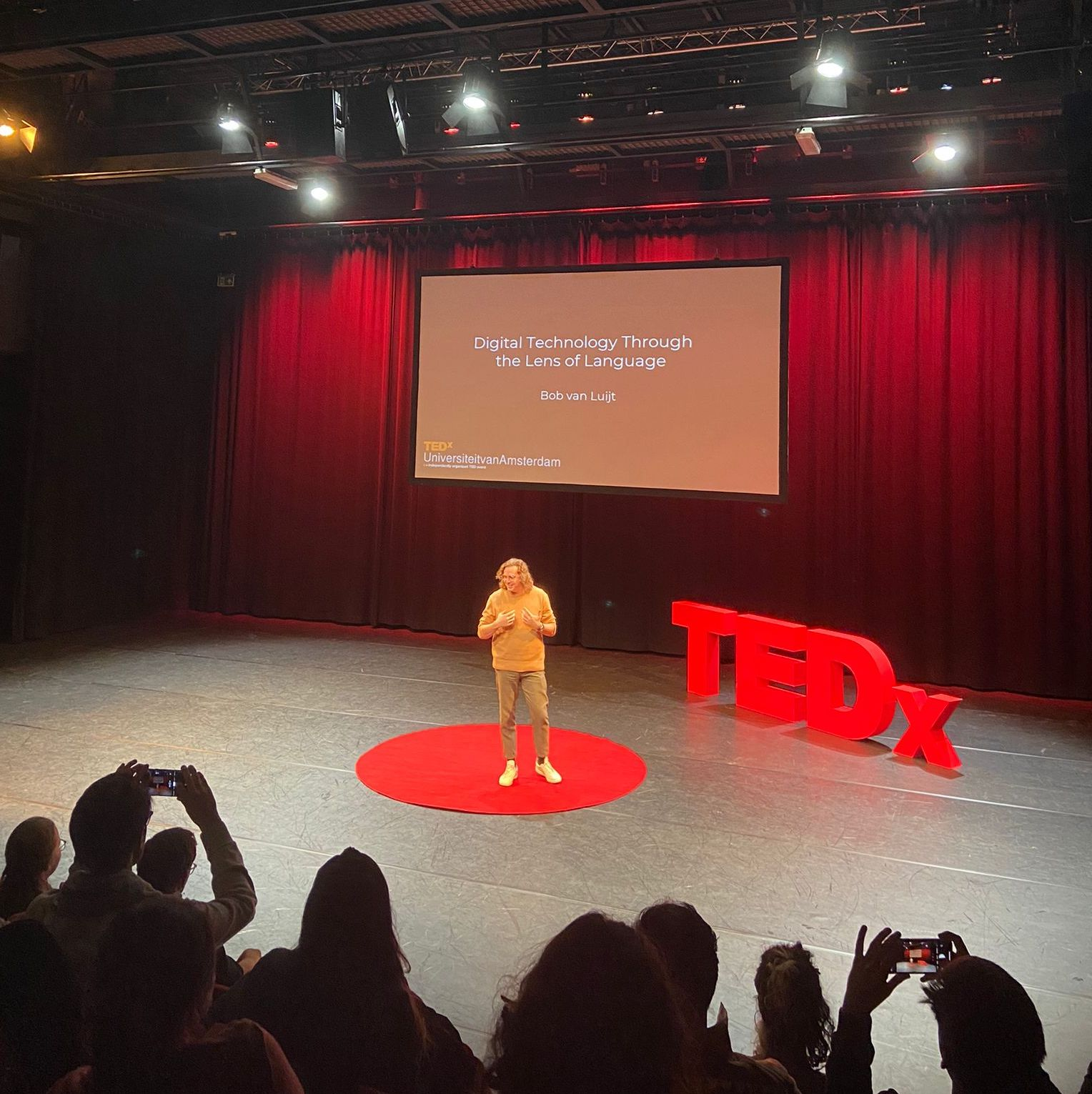
Bob van Luijt presenting at TEDx

Between 2012 and 2013, Van Luijt was an early participant and commentator in the Dutch Bitcoin community. During this period, he advocated for the adoption of digital currencies and commented on the systemic challenges faced by early users within the traditional banking sector.

In March 2016, while operating his strategic design and software consultancy Kubrickology, a name chosen as a tribute to the meticulous aesthetic and systemic approach of filmmaker Stanley Kubrick, Van Luijt started the open source vector database Weaviate. To transition the open-source project into a dedicated commercial entity, he ceased the operations of Kubrickology and co-founded the company SeMI Technologies (later renamed Weaviate). While the database was originally architected to store and search data based on semantic meaning rather than traditional keywords, it evolved under Van Luijt's direction into a full-fledged primary vector database designed for production-scale AI applications.

During the rise of generative AI, Van Luijt positioned Weaviate as a provider of "AI-native" infrastructure, specifically focusing on Retrieval-Augmented Generation (RAG). He is a frequent commentator on the "AI Stack" and the evolution of open-source business models.

Van Luijt is also an angel investor, focusing on software infrastructure, artificial intelligence, and biological computing.

== New Media & Arts ==
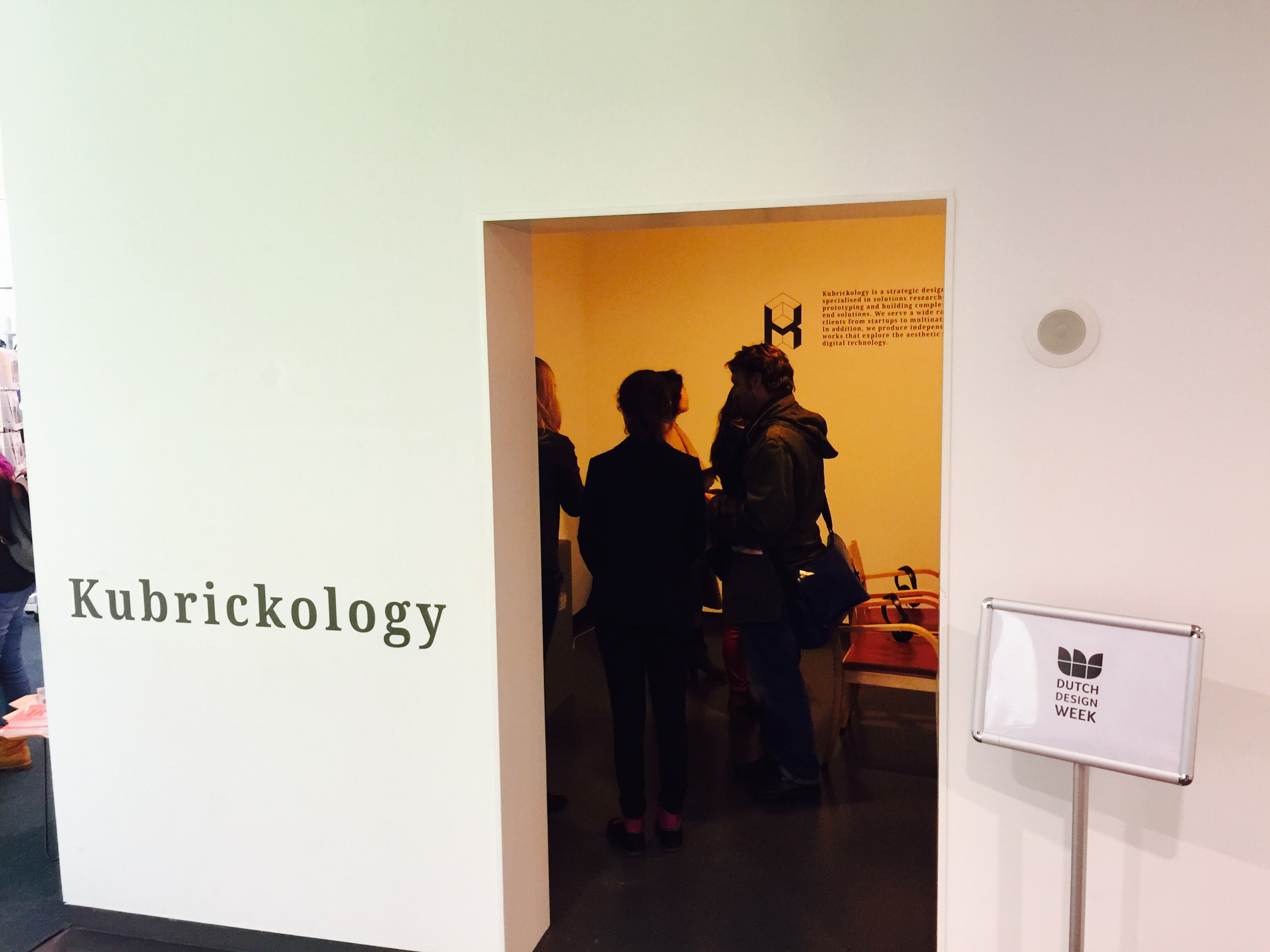
Kubrickology at the Dutch Design Week in the Van Abbemuseum

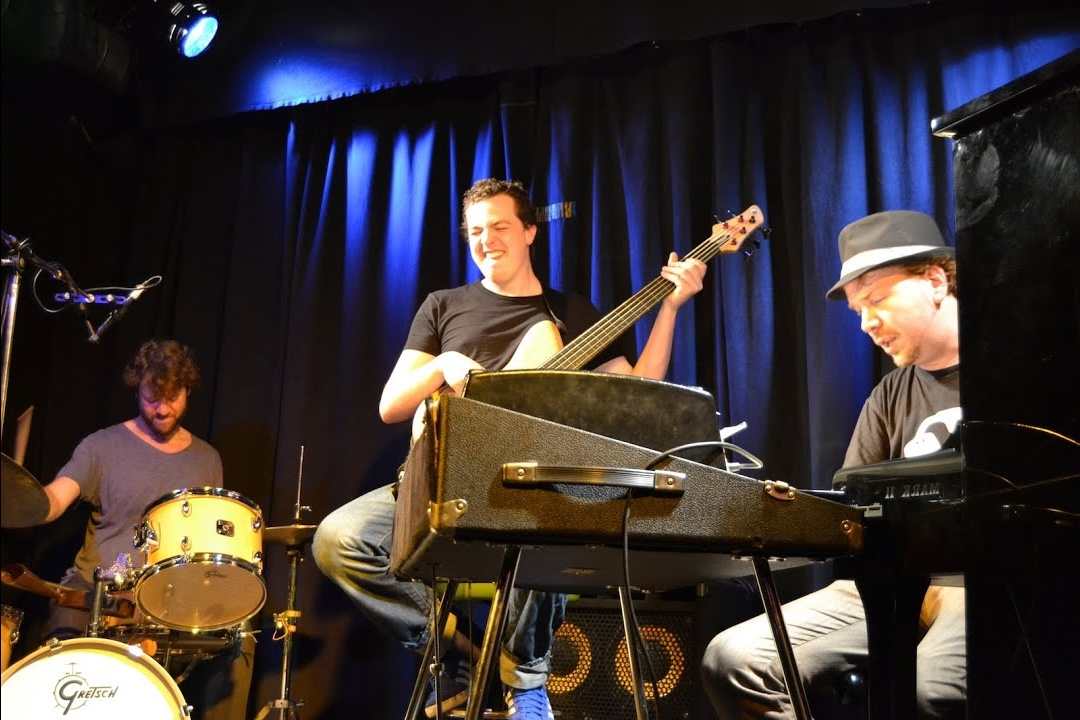
Billy Martin, Bob van Luijt, Florian Weber in concert in Arnhem

Following his studies, Van Luijt worked on projects including his album The Core. He collaborated on harpist Anne Vanschothorst's album Ek is eik., and with artists including Billy Martin and Florian Weber, as well as Yonga Sun and Cuong Vu.

His first tech-based artwork, Control(human, data, sound) (CHDS), was selected as an awards Finalist for CREATE 2015 in Pittsburgh.
