= Bergen op Zoom =

- City and municipality
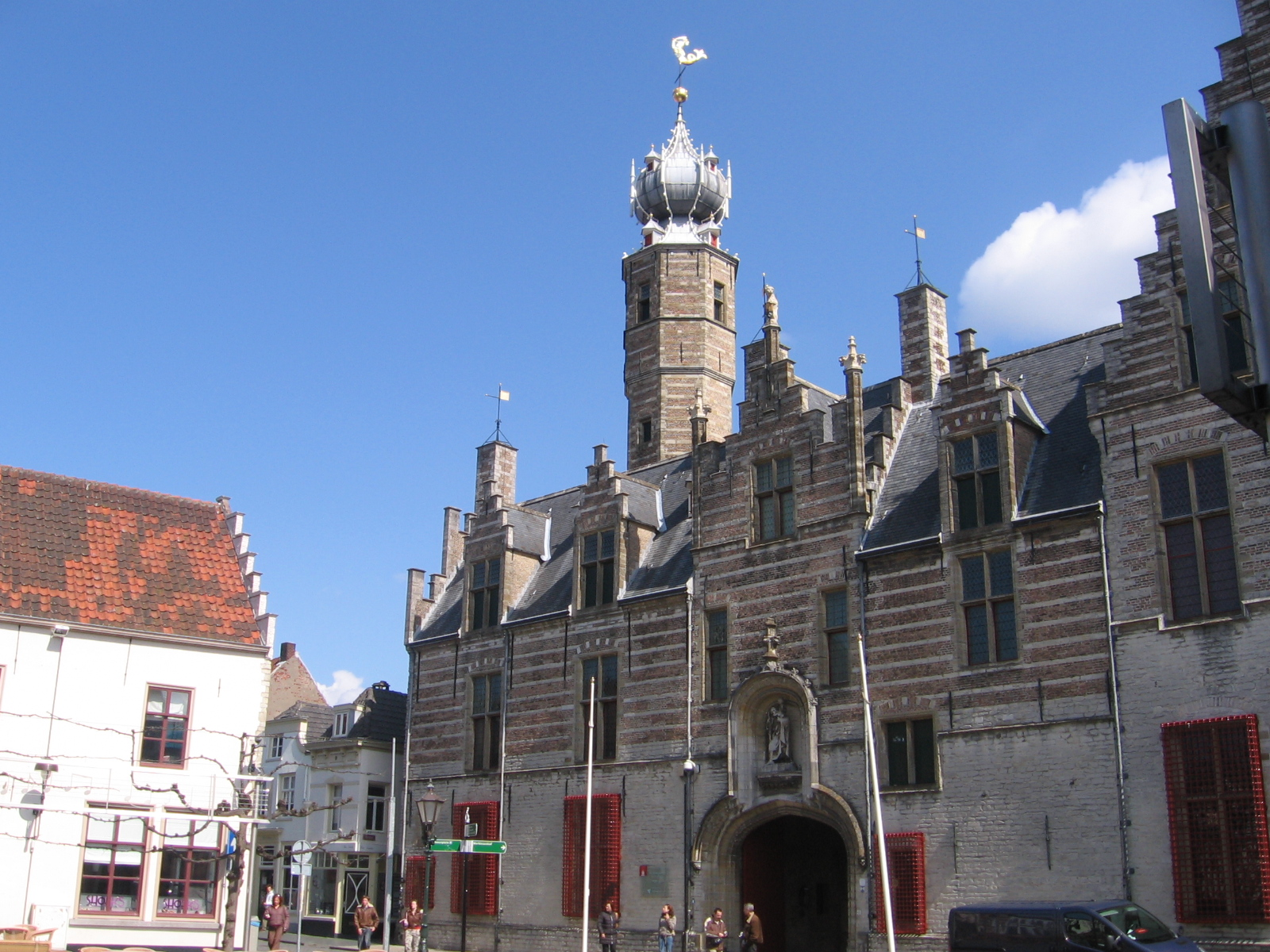
- Markiezenhof in Bergen op Zoom

- Flag Coat of arms
- Anthem: Merck toch hoe sterck
- Location in North Brabant

- Location within the Netherlands Location within Europe
- Coordinates: 51°30′N 4°18′E
- Country: Netherlands
- Province: North Brabant

Government
  - Body: Municipal council
  - Mayor: Margo Mulder (PVDA)

Area
  - Total: 93.13 km^{2} (35.96 sq mi)
  - Land: 79.96 km^{2} (30.87 sq mi)
  - Water: 13.17 km^{2} (5.08 sq mi)
- Elevation: 10 m (33 ft)

Population (January 2021)
  - Total: 67,514
  - Density: 844/km^{2} (2,190/sq mi)
- Demonym: Bergenaar
- Time zone: UTC+1 (CET)
  - Summer (DST): UTC+2 (CEST)
- Postcode: 4600–4625, 4660–4664
- Area code: 0164
- Website: www.bergenopzoom.nl

Bergen op Zoom (Dutch pronunciation: [ˌbɛrɣə(n) ɔp ˈsoːm]; (Note: Zoom in isolation is [ˈzoːm].) called Berrege [ˈbɛrəɣə] in the local dialect) is a city and municipality in southwestern Netherlands. It is located in the province of North Brabant, at the provincial border with Zeeland. In 2025, the municipality had a population of 70,216.

== Etymology ==
The city was built on a site where two types of soil meet: sandy soil and marine clay. The sandy soil pushed against the marine clay, accumulating and forming hills over several centuries. People called those hills the Brabantse Wal, literally meaning "ramparts of Brabant". Zoom refers to the border of these ramparts and bergen in Dutch means mountains or hills. The name has nothing to do with the little channel, the Zoom, which was later built through Bergen op Zoom.

== History ==
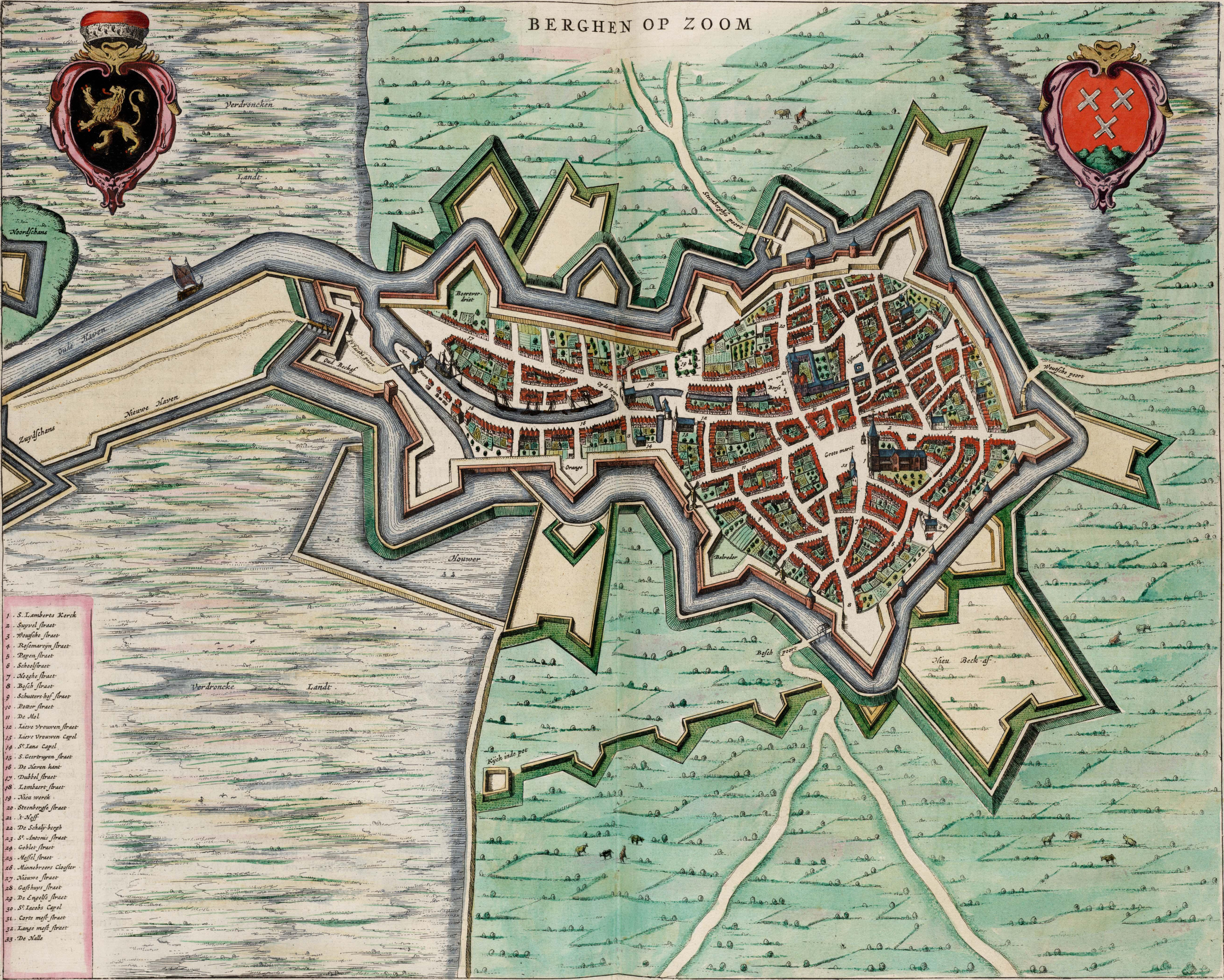
Bergen op Zoom in 1649. Note marshes (left, top right), canalized diversion of the Scheldt and extensive fortifications.

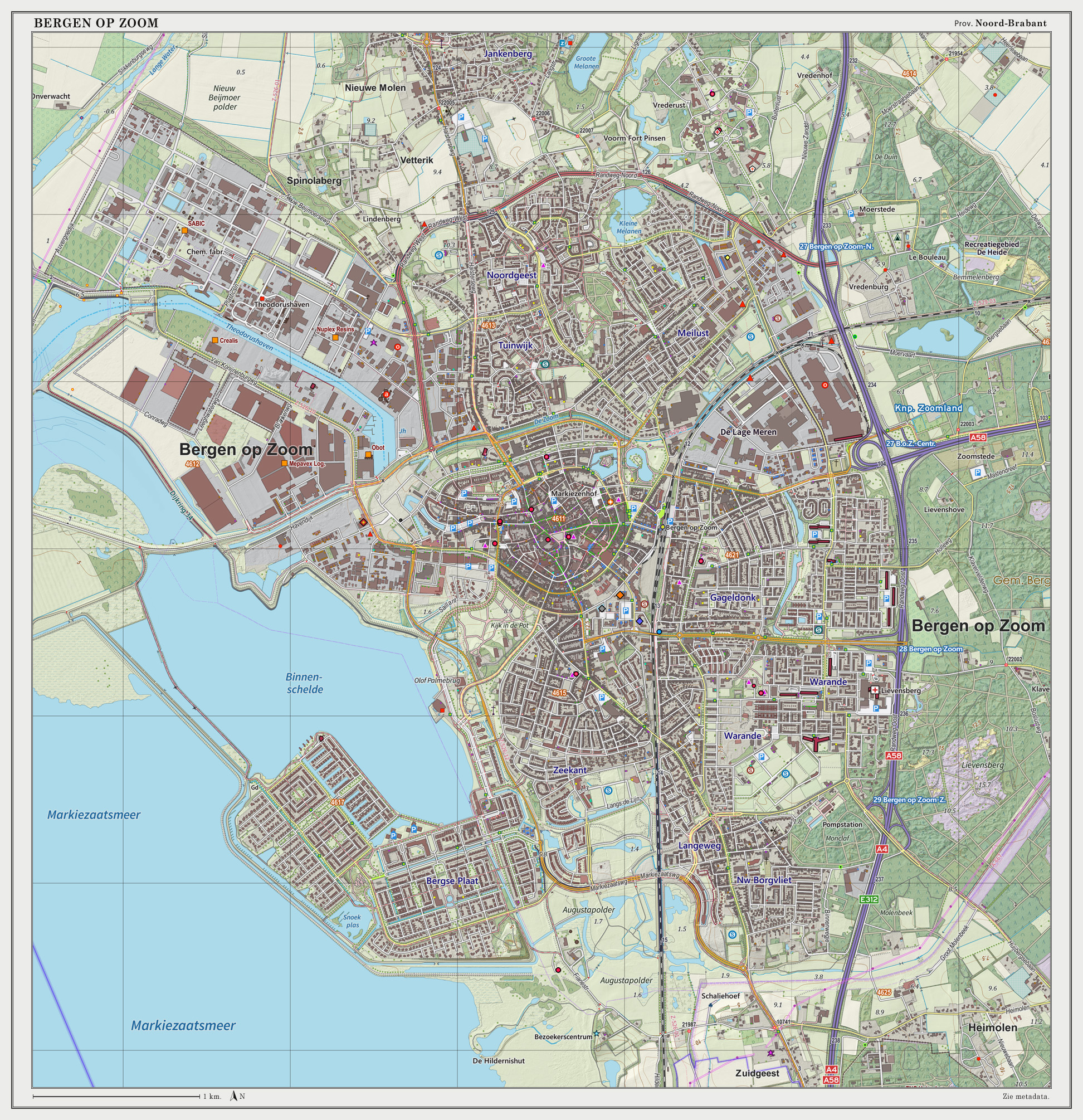
Topographic map of Bergen op Zoom, March 2014

Bergen op Zoom was granted city status probably in 1212. In 1287 the city and its surroundings became a lordship as it was separated from the lordship of Breda. The lordship was elevated to a margraviate in 1559. Several noble families, including the House of Glymes, ruled Bergen op Zoom in succession until 1795, although the title was only nominal since at least the seventeenth century.

During the early modern period, Bergen op Zoom was a very strong fortress and one of the main armories and arsenals of the United Provinces. It had a remarkable natural defensive site, surrounded as it was by marshes and easily flooded polders. Furthermore, it could receive reinforcements and supplies by sea, if the besieging army did not have a fleet to blockade its port.

Due to these features, the city was one of the strategic points held by the Dutch during their revolt in the Eighty Years War, beginning in the late sixteenth century. It was at that time besieged by Alessandro Farnese first in 1588, and by Ambrosio Spinola a second time in 1622. Both sieges were unsuccessful, and Bergen op Zoom got the nickname La Pucelle or The Virgin as it was never successfully taken in a siege.

In 1747, during the War of the Austrian Succession, the French army laid siege to the city. Bergen op Zoom had been fortified by new works built at the beginning of the 17th century by Menno van Coehoorn, with three forts surrounding the city and a canalized diversion of the Scheldt acting as a ditch around its walls. However, it had no second line of fortifications, nor any fortress. After seventy days of siege, the city was taken and thoroughly sacked; the garrison was slaughtered.

During the War of the Sixth Coalition, the town was again besieged by the British in March 1814 in a failed attempt to dislodge the French garrison.

=== Trading town ===
During the reign of Jan II van Glymes (1417–1494), nicknamed "Jan metten Lippen" (meaning "Jan with the big lips", probably caused by an infection), a surge in economic growth occurred in the city. Large fairs were held twice a year, in spring and fall, that were known both nationally and internationally. Merchants from all over Europe came to Bergen op Zoom to sell their goods.

Because of this major economic growth, the Sint-Gertrudischurch was enlarged. The enlargement was called the Nieuw Werck but was never finished, because of the economic recession of the mid-16th century. It fell into ruin. The economic recession was largely caused by the poor accessibility of the port, due to a number of floods in Zeeland and West-Brabant. Because of the great reliance on the port, the economic growth received a major blow. In addition, the modernization of trade techniques, such as establishing of a permanent stock exchange instead of the fairs, which took place twice a year, also damaged the local economy.

The fairs continued until 1910. Despite the end of the two big fairs, Bergen op Zoom still hosts all kinds of smaller fairs and events.

=== Religion ===
During the Eighty Years' War, Bergen op Zoom chose the side of the Dutch Republic, and, simultaneously, Protestantism. The Catholics of the city either adapted or moved to the surrounding countryside, which remained largely Catholic. The inhabitants who chose to stay Catholic went to church in secret barns and houses, since the local Sint-Getrudischurch was assigned to the Protestant community.

Slowly, most of the city council members of Bergen op Zoom became Protestant. Protestants dominated the council until the 18th century. After that, the number of Catholics in Bergen op Zoom increased and, during the second part of the 18th century, a majority of Bergen op Zoom's population was Catholic again. Although the Catholics enjoyed religious freedom during the French period in 1795–1814, their emancipation did not take place until later.

In 1832, a Catholic parish, the ‘Heilige Maagd ten Ophemeling’, was allowed to have its own church. In the same period, the Jewish community built a synagogue for their use.

In 1972, the Protestant community, after the loss of many members, gave the Sint-Getrudischurch to the Catholic parish. Since the return of the Church, Catholic services have been held here again.

As a result of Turkish and Moroccan immigration to the Netherlands, the city has a significant Muslim minority.

== Population centres ==
- Bergen op Zoom (population: 65,691, July 2006)
  - Heimolen
  - Halsteren (11,410)
  - Lepelstraat (2,070)
  - Kladde

== City of Bergen op Zoom ==
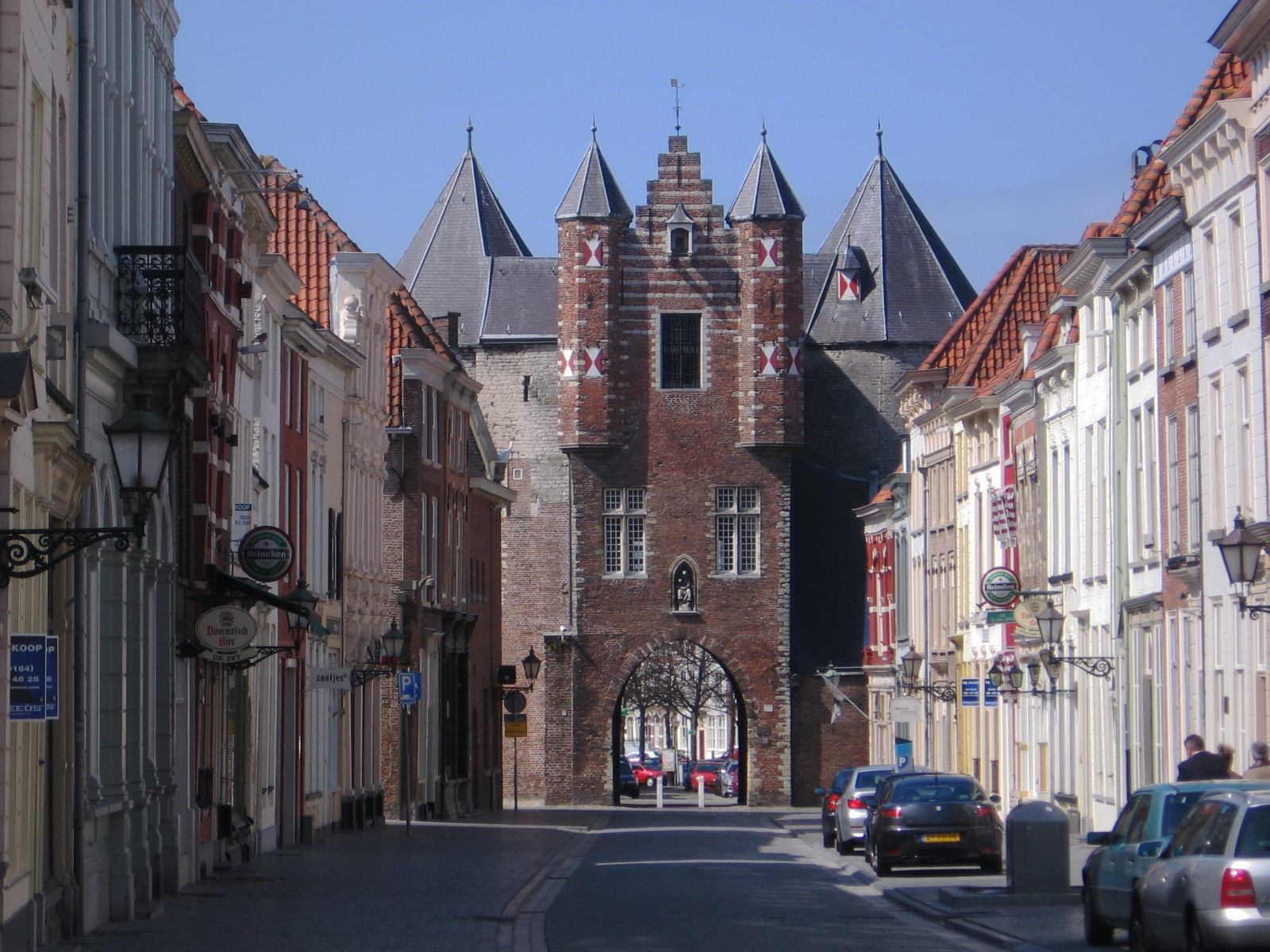
Gevangenpoort, the oldest monument in Bergen op Zoom

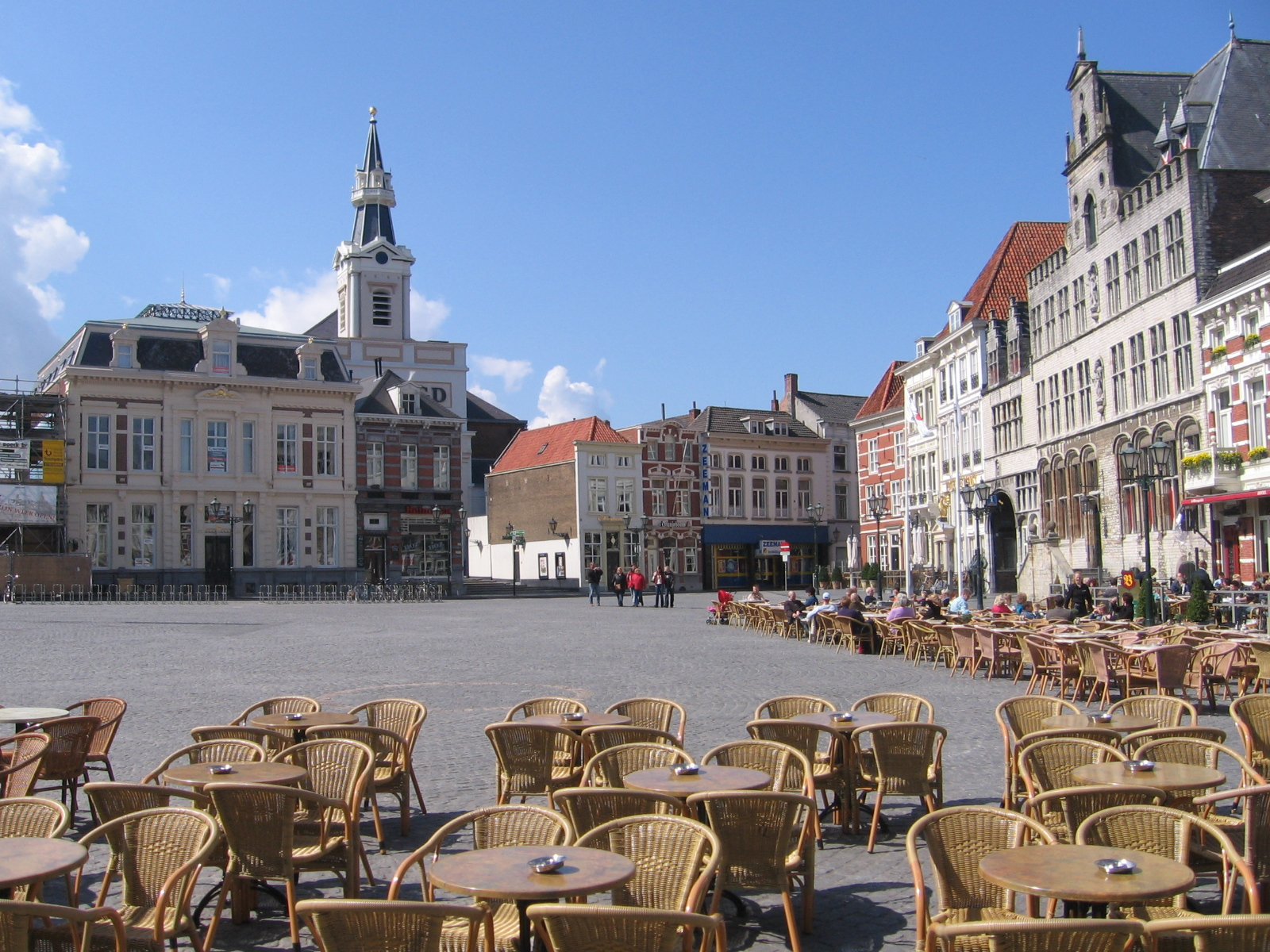
Grote Markt

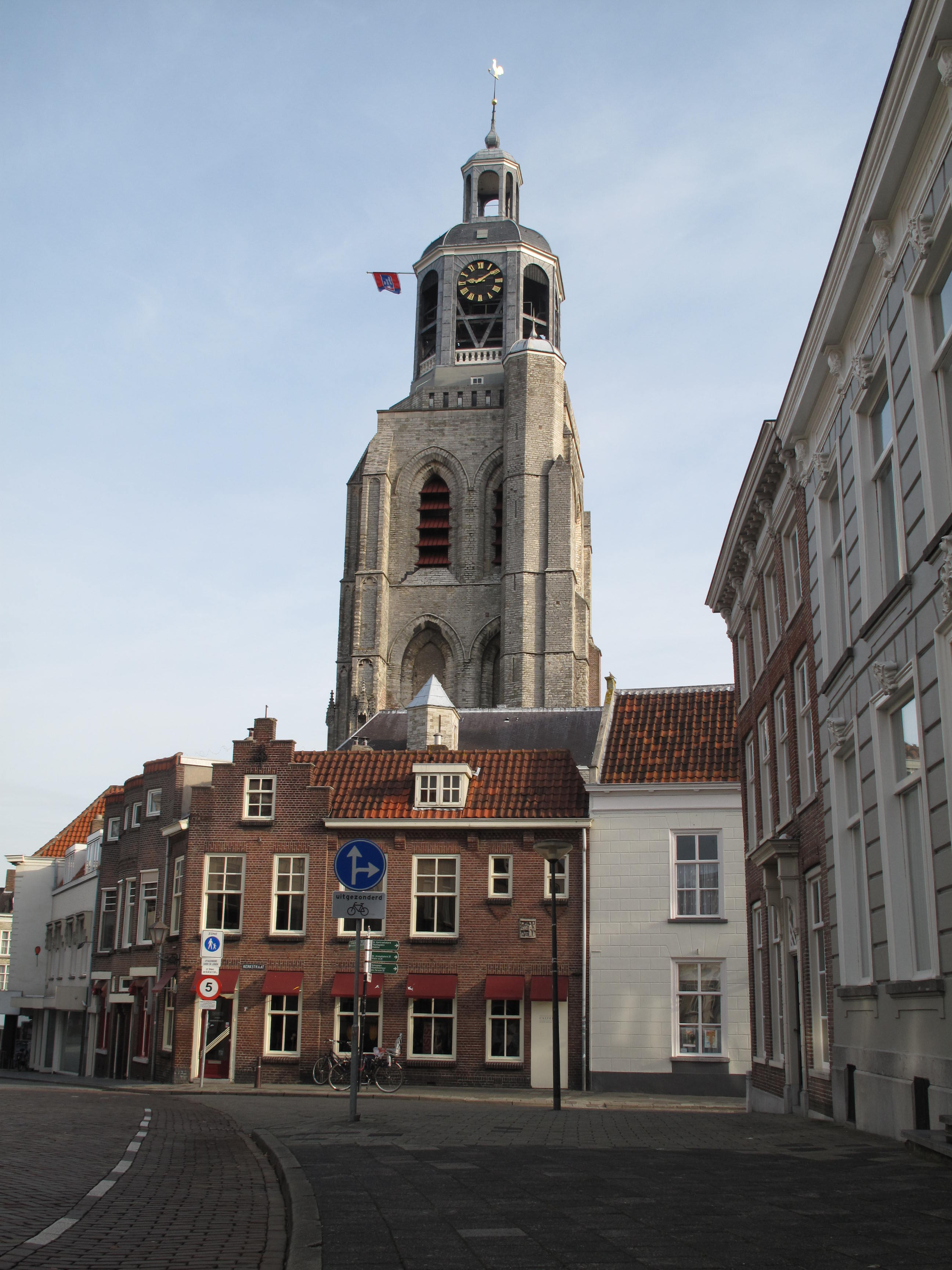
Gertrudiskerk

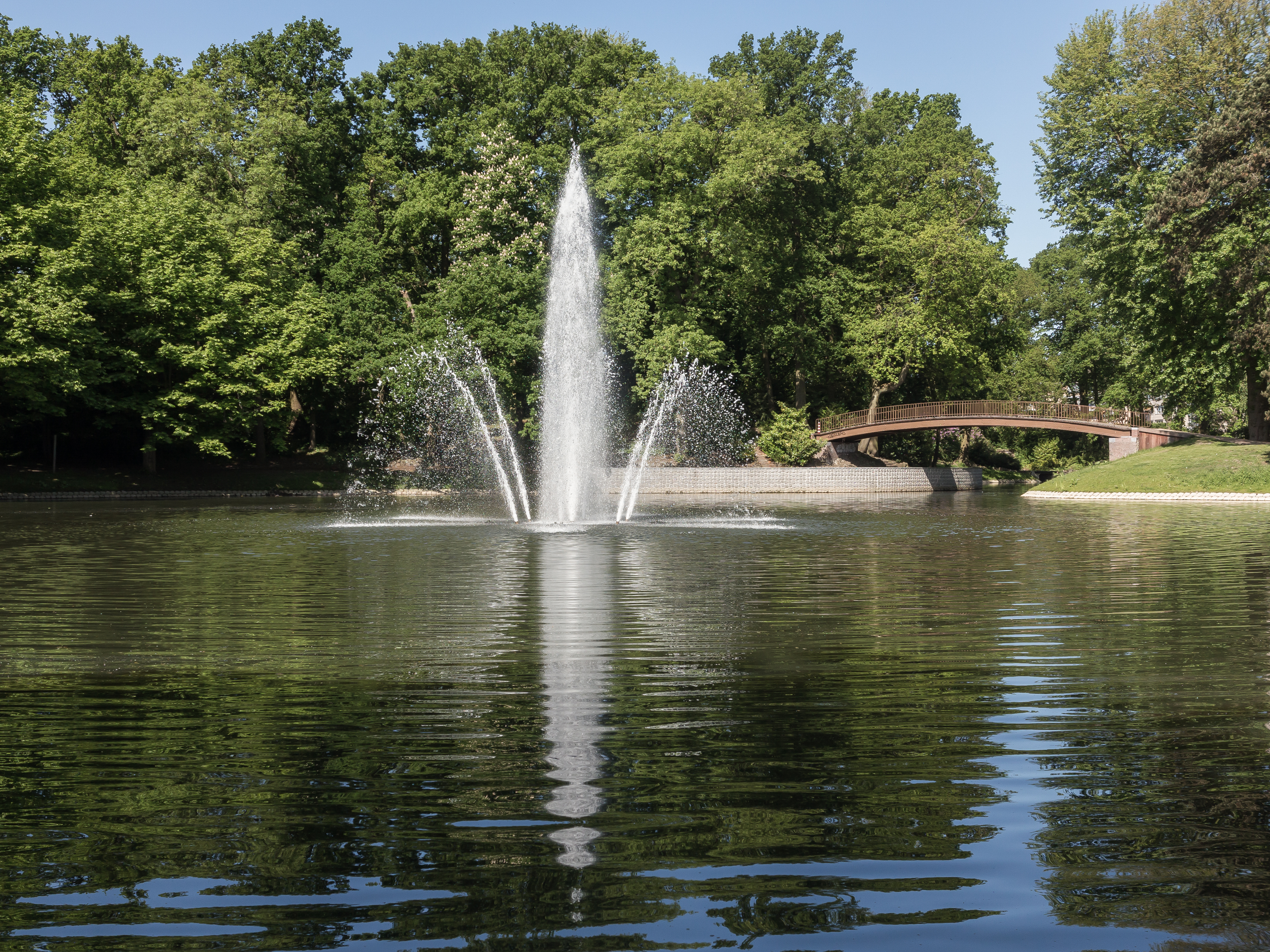
Bergen op Zoom, fountain and bridge in park

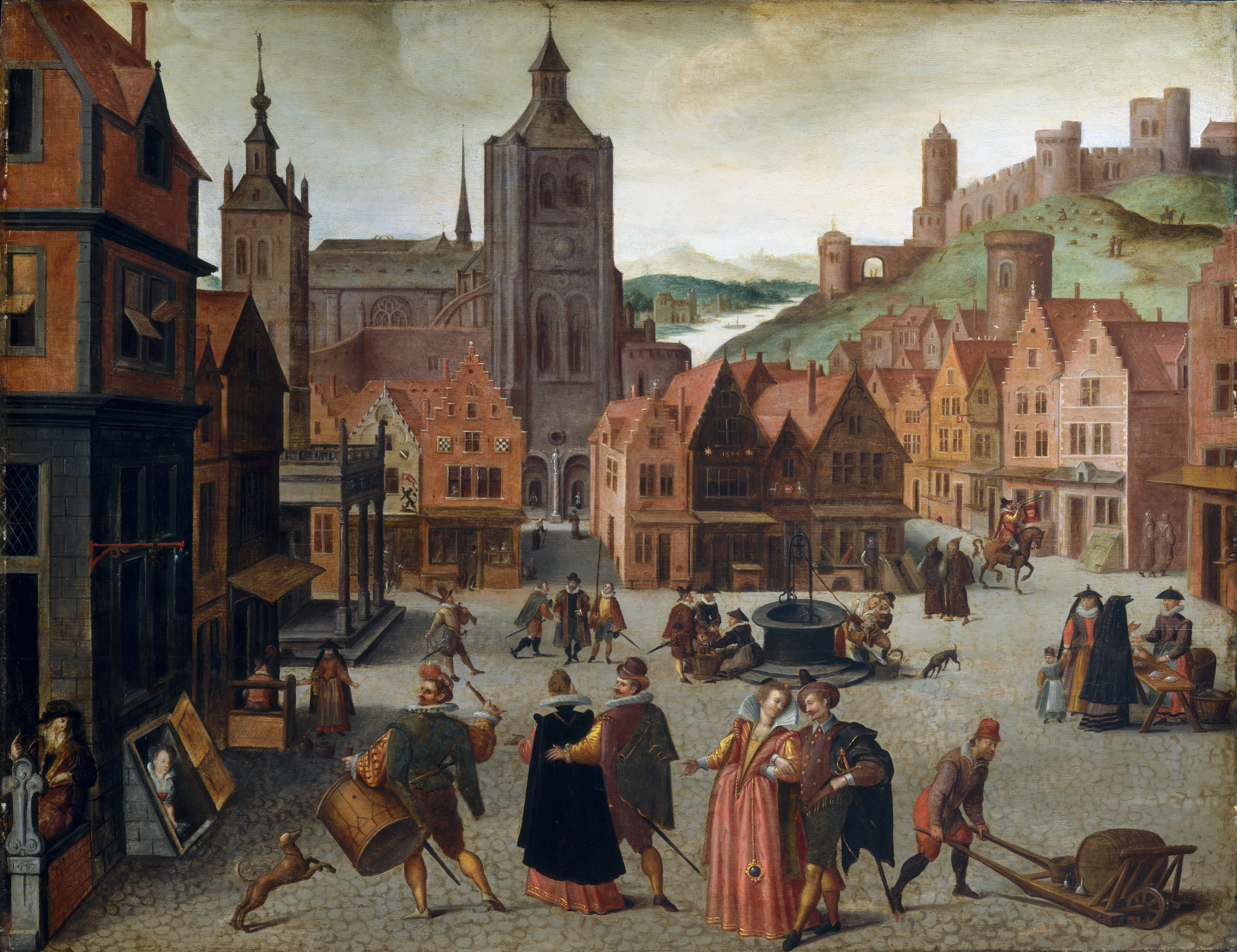
The Marketplace at Bergen op Zoom. Attributed to Abel Grimmer, 1590s. National Gallery of Art, Washington.

The Markiezenhof Palace, built in the fifteenth and sixteenth centuries, houses a cultural centre and a museum with a picturesque courtyard, paintings, period rooms, and temporary exhibitions. SABIC Innovative Plastics operates a major manufacturing facility in Bergen op Zoom. Philip Morris was another major employer until it closed its plant in 2014.

The oldest hotel in the Netherlands, Hotel De Draak, which was founded in 1397, is located in the historic center of the city. The current building is from 1500 and is a protected monument.

== Transport ==
- Bergen op Zoom railway station

== Notable people ==
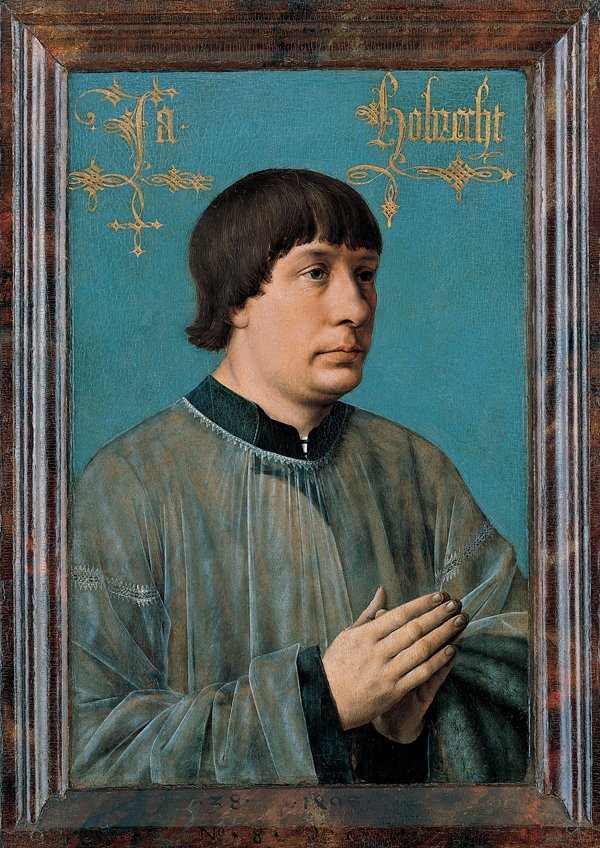
Jacob Obrecht, 1496

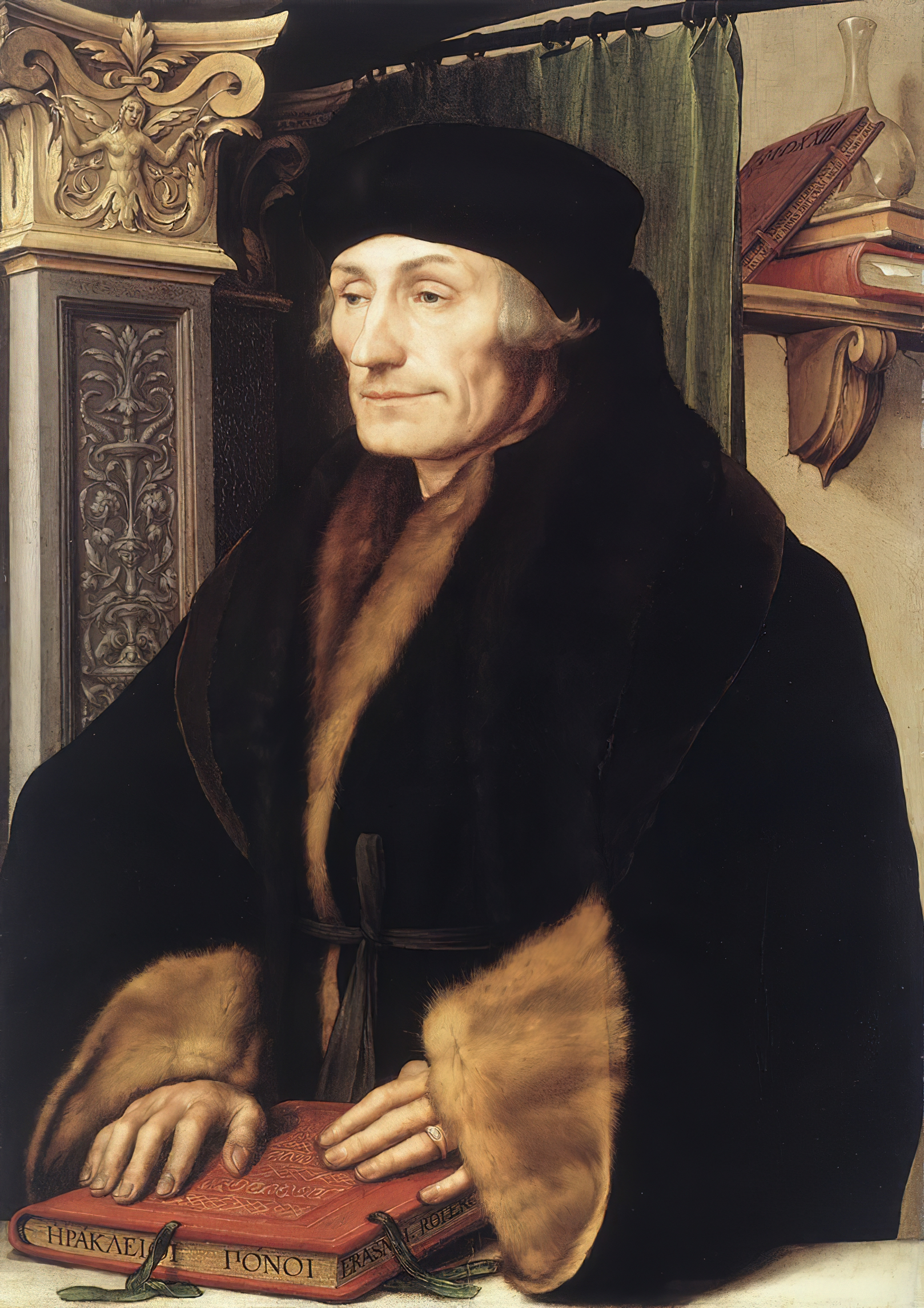
Erasmus, 1523

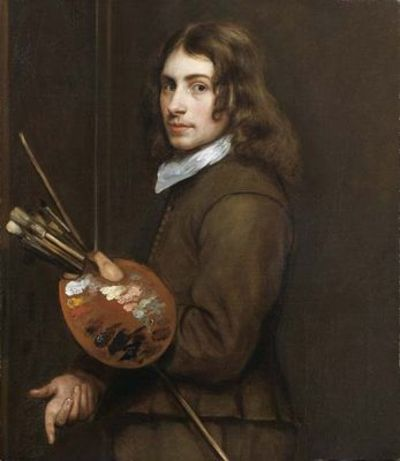
Willeboirts Bosschaert, 1637

=== The arts ===
- Jacob Obrecht (1457–1505) composer, mainly of sacred music
- Desiderius Erasmus (1466–1536) humanist, philosopher, author
- Abel Grimmer (1570–1619) a Flemish late Renaissance painter, mainly of landscapes
- Gerrit Houckgeest (1600–1661) a Dutch Golden Age painter of architectural scenes and church interiors
- Bartram de Fouchier (1609–1673) a Dutch Golden Age painter
- Marcus Zuerius van Boxhorn (1612–1653) historian, author and scholar
- Thomas Willeboirts Bosschaert (1613–1654) a Flemish Baroque painter
- Pieter van der Willigen (1634–1694) a Flemish Baroque painter
- Govert-Marinus Augustijn (1871–1963) a Dutch Art Nouveau potter
- Kees Smout (1876–1961) a Dutch sculptor
- Anton van Duinkerken (1903–1968) a Dutch poet, essayist and academic
- Louis Boekhout (1919–2012) a Dutch painter who emigrated to Québec, Canada
- Pleuni Touw (born 1938) a Dutch film, television and theatre actress
- Adriaan Ditvoorst (1940–1987) a Dutch film director, screenwriter
- Cornald Maas (born 1967) a Dutch television presenter
- Martin Fondse (born 1967) a Dutch pianist and composer who plays the vibrandoneon
- Bob van Luijt (born 1985) a Dutch technology entrepreneur, technologist and new media artist
- Julia Boschman (born 2002) a Dutch singer in famous girl group K3

=== Public thinking and public service ===
- Pieter Gerardus van Overstraten (1755–1801) last Governor-General of the Dutch East Indies
- Gerrit Verdooren van Asperen (1757–1824) vice-admiral of the Royal Netherlands Navy
- Jacob Van Braam (1729–1792) a soldier of fortune, swordmaster and mercenary.
- Gillis Pieter de Neve (1823–1883) commander of the Royal Netherlands East Indies Army
- Albert Vogel (1874–1933) a Dutch Army officer and teacher
- Peter Sitsen (1885–1945) a military officer, building contractor and public servant in colonial Indonesia
- Ed Nijpels (born 1950) a retired Dutch politician
- Virginie Korte-van Hemel (1929–2014) a Dutch politician
- Bernard de Wit (born 1945) a Dutch theoretical physicist and academic
- Paul Schnabel (born 1948) a Dutch sociologist, academic and politician
- Wim Crusio (born 1954) a Dutch behavioral neurogeneticist and academic
- Fatma Koşer Kaya (born 1968) a Dutch lawyer and politician of Turkish origin

=== Sports ===
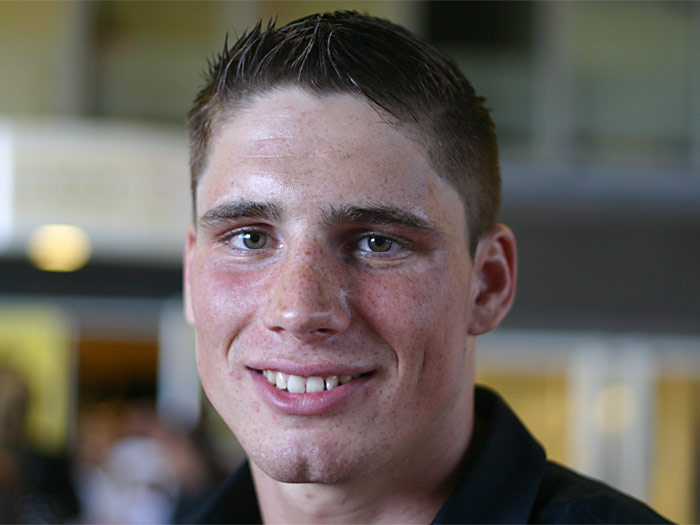
Rico Verhoeven, 2009

- Reindert de Favauge (1872–1949) a sport shooter, competed at the 1908 and 1920 Summer Olympics
- Henk Kersken (1880–1967) a sailor who competed at the 1928 Summer Olympics
- Barent Momma (1897–1936) a modern pentathlete, competed at the 1924 Summer Olympics
- Willem van Rhijn (1903–1979) a modern pentathlete, competed at the 1928 and 1932 Summer Olympics
- Janus van der Zande (1924–2016) a marathon runner, competed in the 1952 Summer Olympics
- Maarten Sikking (1948–2009) a field hockey goalkeeper, competed at the 1972 and 1976 Summer Olympics
- Rico Verhoeven (born 1989) a kickboxer
- Oussama Idrissi (born 1996) a footballer

== Twin towns – sister cities ==
Bergen op Zoom is twinned with:

- Oudenaarde, Belgium
- Szczecinek, Poland
- Edmonton, Canada

== See also ==
- 12709 Bergen op Zoom
- Fort de Roovere
- Crusio (ice cream parlor)
- Merck toch hoe sterck
