= Jan Pen =

Dutch economist, professor and columnist

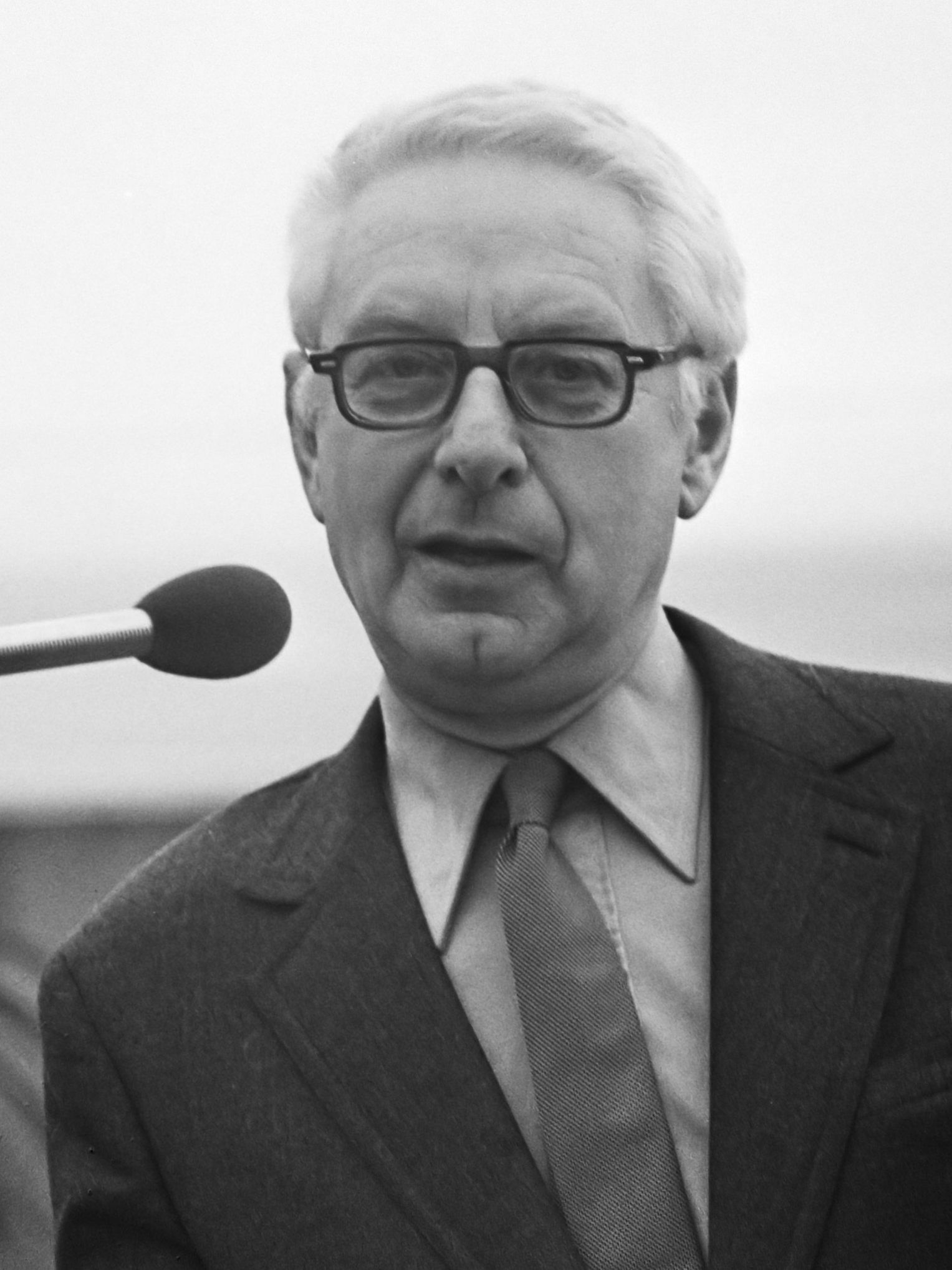
- Born: 15 February 1921; Lemmer, Netherlands
- Died: 14 February 2010 (aged 88); Haren, Groningen, Netherlands

Academic background
- Education: Vrije Universiteit Amsterdam

Academic work
- Discipline: Economic policy
- Institutions: Ministry of Economic Affairs, Netherlands; University of Groningen
- Notable ideas: Pen's parade

Notes
- Thesis Theorie der collectieve loononderhandelingen: poging tot een determinering van het resultaat van de machtsstrijd bij tweezijdig monopolie (Dutch). (1950)

Jan Pen (15 February 1921 – 14 February 2010) was a Dutch economist, professor and columnist. He was the author of several books on economics.

== Life and work ==
Pen studied at the University of Amsterdam, where in 1950 he received his PhD with a thesis concerning the theory of collective wage negotiations. He was Director General Economic Policy at the Ministry of Economic Affairs. In 1956 he was appointed professor of political economy and the theory of public finance at the Faculty of Law and the Faculty of Economics (FEW) of the University of Groningen. He published in 1959 Moderne Economie (Modern economy), for years the general introduction to macroeconomics in the Netherlands. It appeared in various translations, and in 1977 in an updated version entitled Macro-economie (Macroeconomics). Pen gave his farewell lecture in 1986, but remained active as emeritus professor at the Faculty of Economics FEW.

Pen is the creator of the so-called "Pen's parade", a graphical representation of income distribution. In this graph families or individuals are added along on the x-axis ranked from poor to rich, while their level of income is indicated on the y-axis. Another description for this graph is "Parade van dwergen en een enkele reus" (Parade of dwarfs and a single giant), because of the shape this graph takes in many countries.

Pen became member of the Royal Netherlands Academy of Arts and Sciences in 1972.

In 1974 Jan Pen held the third Huizinga Lecture in Leiden. The title of the lecture was "The culture, the money and the people." For years he wrote as a columnist for Het Parool. He also wrote regularly in the Hollands Maandblad and Economisch Statistische Berichten (ESB).

In the 1975 novel Onder professoren about the academic scene in Groningen Willem Frederik Hermans referred to Jan Pen with the fictional character Tabe Pap.

== Jan Pen award ==
The Jan Pen-prijs is an annual award presented by the University of Groningen for high school students who have created the best work in the field of economy and society.

== Selective bibliography ==
Pen has written numerous articles and several books, including:

- Moderne Economie (1958)
- Income distribution: facts, theories and policies (1971)
- Dat stomme economenvolk met zijn heilige koeien (1976)
- Kijk, economie: over mensen, wensen, werk en geld (1979)
- Wie heeft er gelijk? (1989)
- Een overzichtelijke wereld (1998)
