= Willem van Rhijn =

Dutch modern pentathlete (1903–1979)

Personal information
- Born: 10 April 1903 Bergen op Zoom, Netherlands
- Died: 10 January 1979 (aged 75) Bennekom, Netherlands

Sport
- Sport: Modern pentathlon

Willem van Rhijn (10 April 1903 – 10 January 1979) was a Dutch modern pentathlete. He competed at the 1928 and 1932 Summer Olympics.
