= Gillis Pieter de Neve =

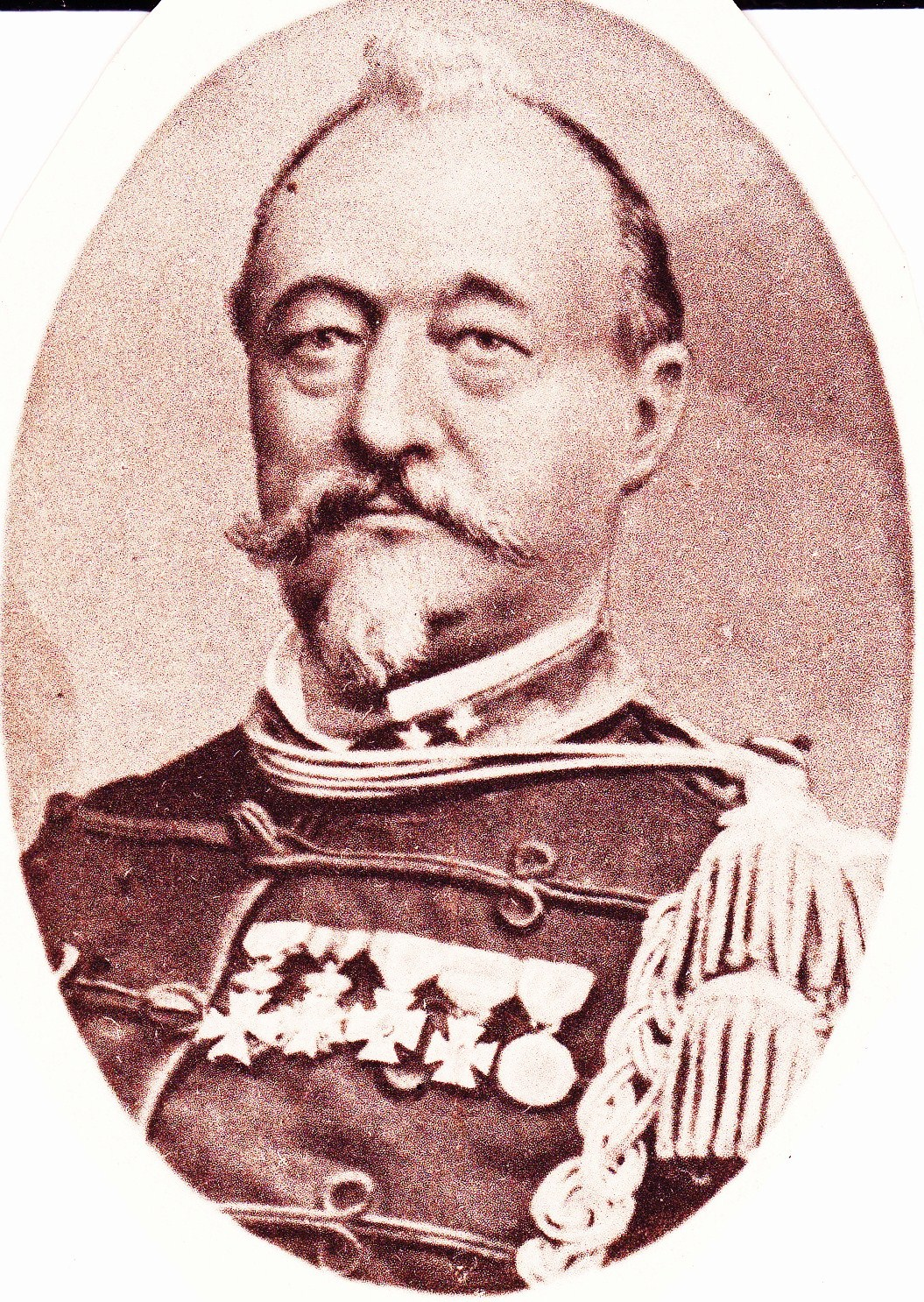
Gillis Pieter de Neve

Gillis Pieter de Neve (30 December 1823, in Bergen-op-Zoom – 19 September 1883, in Leiden) was a Dutch Lieutenant General, commander of the Royal Netherlands East Indies Army and knight and officer in the Military William Order.

== Sources ==
- (in Dutch) Gillis Pieter de Neve in de Digitale bibliotheek voor de Nederlandse letteren
- 1903. G. van Steijn. Gedenkboek Koninklijke Militaire Academie. P.B. Nieuwenhuijs. Breda.
- 1940. G.C.E. Köffler. De Militaire Willemsorde 1815-1940. Algemene Landsdrukkerij. Den Haag.
- 2009. George Frederik Willem Borel. Onze vestiging in Atjeh, drogredenen zijn geen waarheid. Uitgeverij Eburon. Delft. Heruitgave van 1878. Onze vestiging in Atjeh, critisch beschreven D.A. Thieme, Den Haag en 1880. Drogredenen zijn geen waarheid. Henri J. Stemberg, Den Haag.
