= Crusio (ice cream parlor) =

IJssalon Crusio
- Company type: Family business
- Founded: 1915; 111 years ago
- Founder: Willem Crusio
- Headquarters: Bergen op Zoom, The Netherlands
- Key people: Coen Crusio; Kiona Malinka
- Products: Ice cream, pastries, coffee, tea
- Services: Catering
- Owner: Coen Crusio; Kiona Malinka
- Website: www.crusio.nl

IJssalon Crusio is an ice cream parlor in the center of Bergen op Zoom, the Netherlands. It was founded in 1915 and has received multiple awards. The parlor is open all year long.

== History ==
The ice cream parlor is a family business that was founded in 1915 by Willem Crusio. His two sons continued in two ice cream parlors, of which one is still in existence and operated by the fourth generation of the family. The ice cream is made according to a secret family recipe. The parlor is currently operated by Coen Crusio and his partner Kiona Malinka. An annual marketing event is the "Lente IJs" (English: Spring ice cream) action, where for several hours ice cream with a spring-inspired flavor (such as rose petal) is distributed for free. In 2022 the opening of a second ice cream parlor in Hoogerheide was announced for Spring 2023.

== Awards ==
IJssalon Crusio has received multiple awards for its ice-cream creations. In 1981, Gerard Crusio won first place in the national ice-making competition at that year's Horecava fair. At the "IJsVak 2012", "De Gouden IJscreatie 2012" was won by Malinka for her creation "Olijfje" (little olive), a combination of lemon and vanilla ice cream with ice cream made of Provençal black olives. The ice cream was garnished with the same olive oil, a snow made of this oil, and a lemon zest that had been marinated in sea salt for half a year. In addition, Malinka won the "Passie Award 2012" (English: Passion Award 2012) at the same event.

Also in 2012, the parlor was ranked second in a national coffee test organized by a national daily newspaper, the Algemeen Dagblad.
