= Halsteren =

Halsteren Altere
- Town
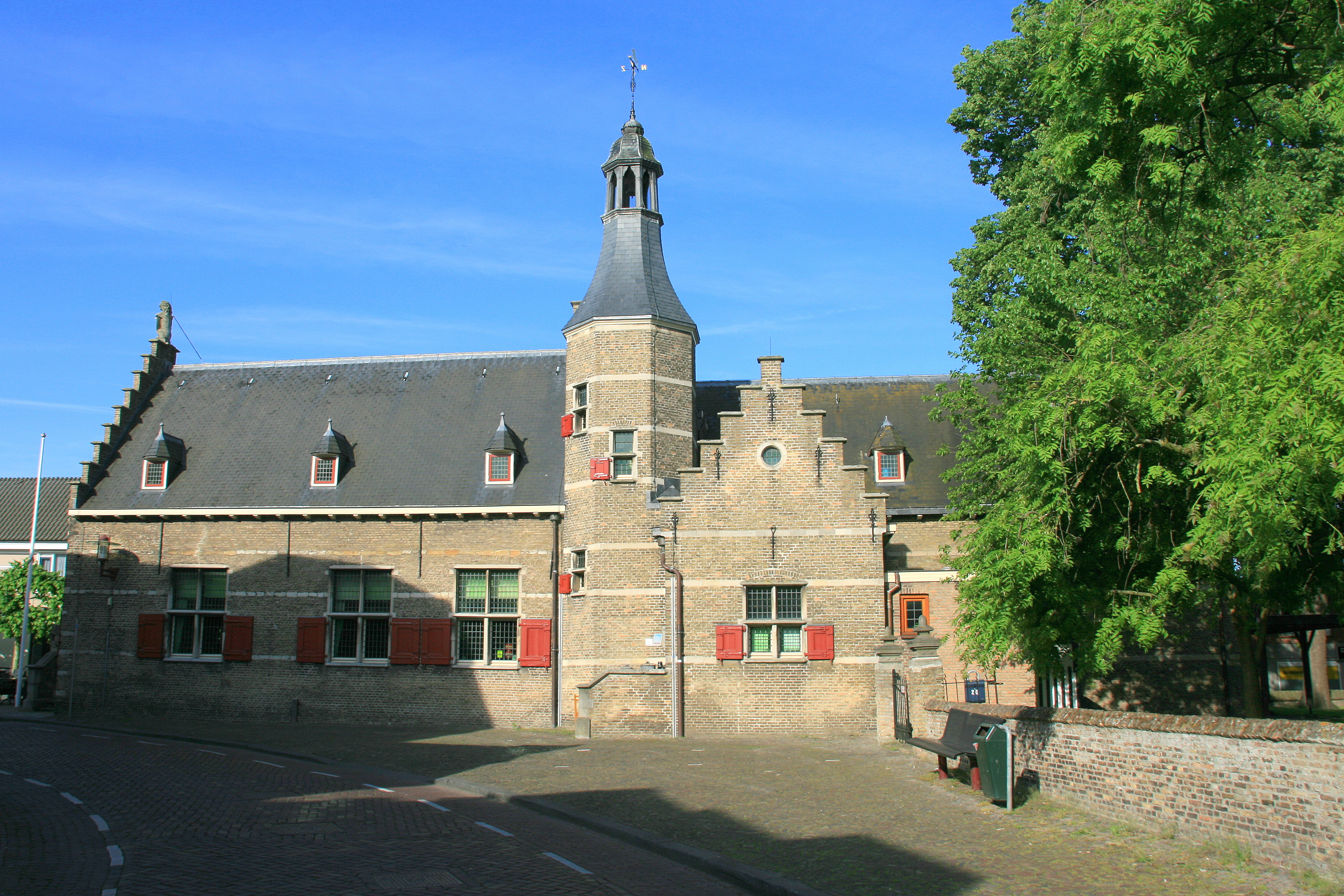
- Former town hall of Halsteren

- Location in the province of North Brabant in the Netherlands Halsteren (Netherlands)
- Coordinates: 51°31′N 4°16′E
- Country: Netherlands
- Province: North Brabant
- Municipality: Bergen op Zoom

Area
  - Total: 16.43 km^{2} (6.34 sq mi)
- Elevation: 6 m (20 ft)

Population (2021)
  - Total: 12,325
  - Density: 750.2/km^{2} (1,943/sq mi)
- Time zone: UTC+1 (CET)
  - Summer (DST): UTC+2 (CEST)
- Postal code: 4661
- Dialing code: 0164

Halsteren is a town in the Dutch province of North Brabant. It is located in the municipality of Bergen op Zoom, about 1 km north of that city. Halsteren has an old church from the 14th century and a new church, built in 1919. A little village called Polder was located between Halsteren and Tholen in the Middle Ages.

== History ==
The village was first mentioned in 1272 as Halstert, and means "bend in the highland with a tail". It developed on a westward pointing sandy ridge.

The Dutch Reformed church was built in the 14th century. It was extended in 1457. After a fire in 1607, it was extensively restored. In 1799, it was returned to the Catholic church and restored several times. In 1961, it became a Dutch Reformed church again. The Catholic St. Quirinus Church was built between 1911 and 1912 and has a double tower. The former town hall dates from 1633. It was restored and extended in 1917. It was restored in 1944 after a fire.

Halsteren was home to 538 people in 1840. Halsteren was a separate municipality until 1997, when it became a part of Bergen op Zoom.

The village of Polder or Polre was located near Halsteren. It disappeared in a flood in 1570 and most of the village is still buried underneath a metre of mud.

== Gallery ==
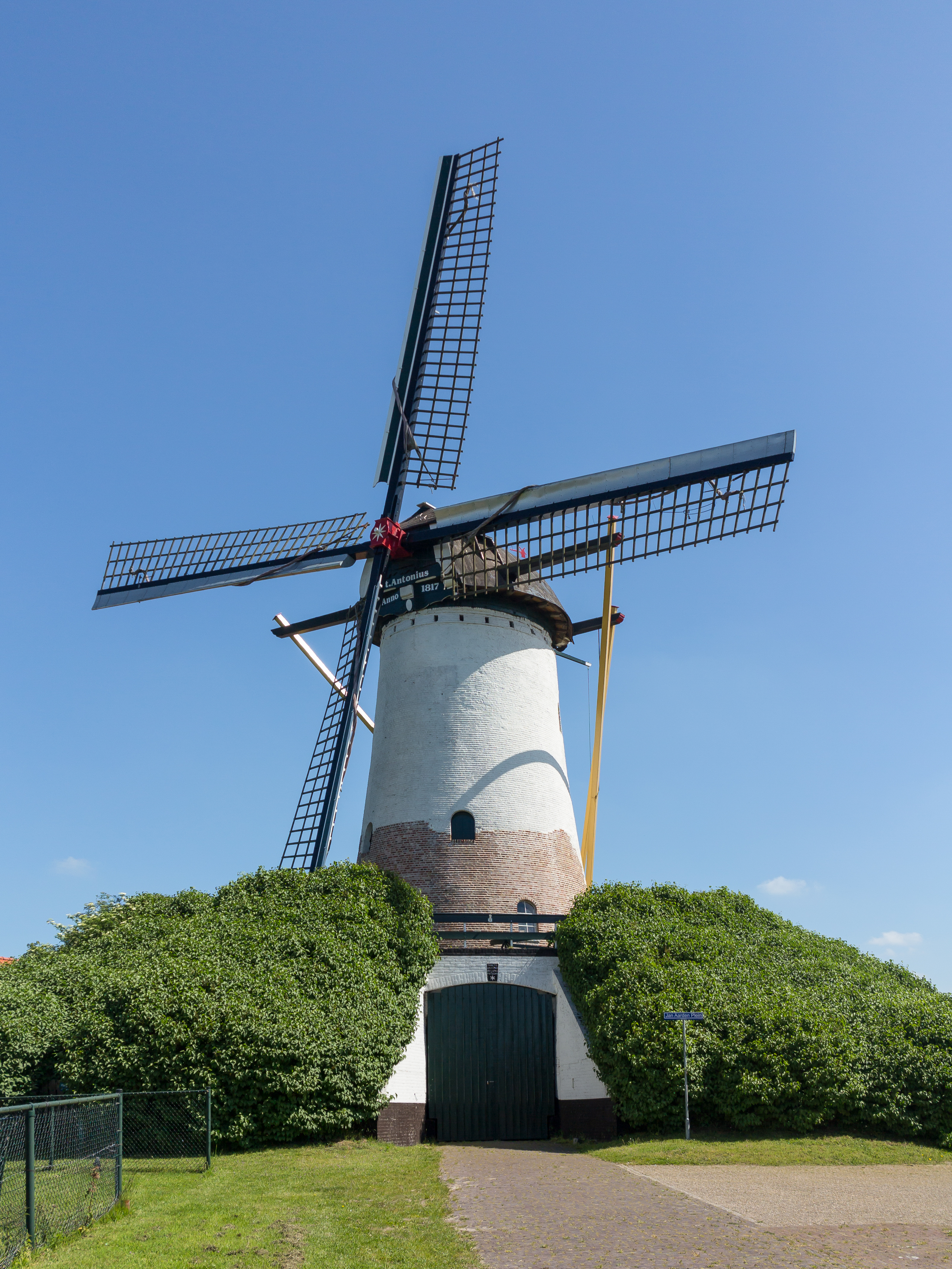
Windmill: the Sint Antoniusmolen

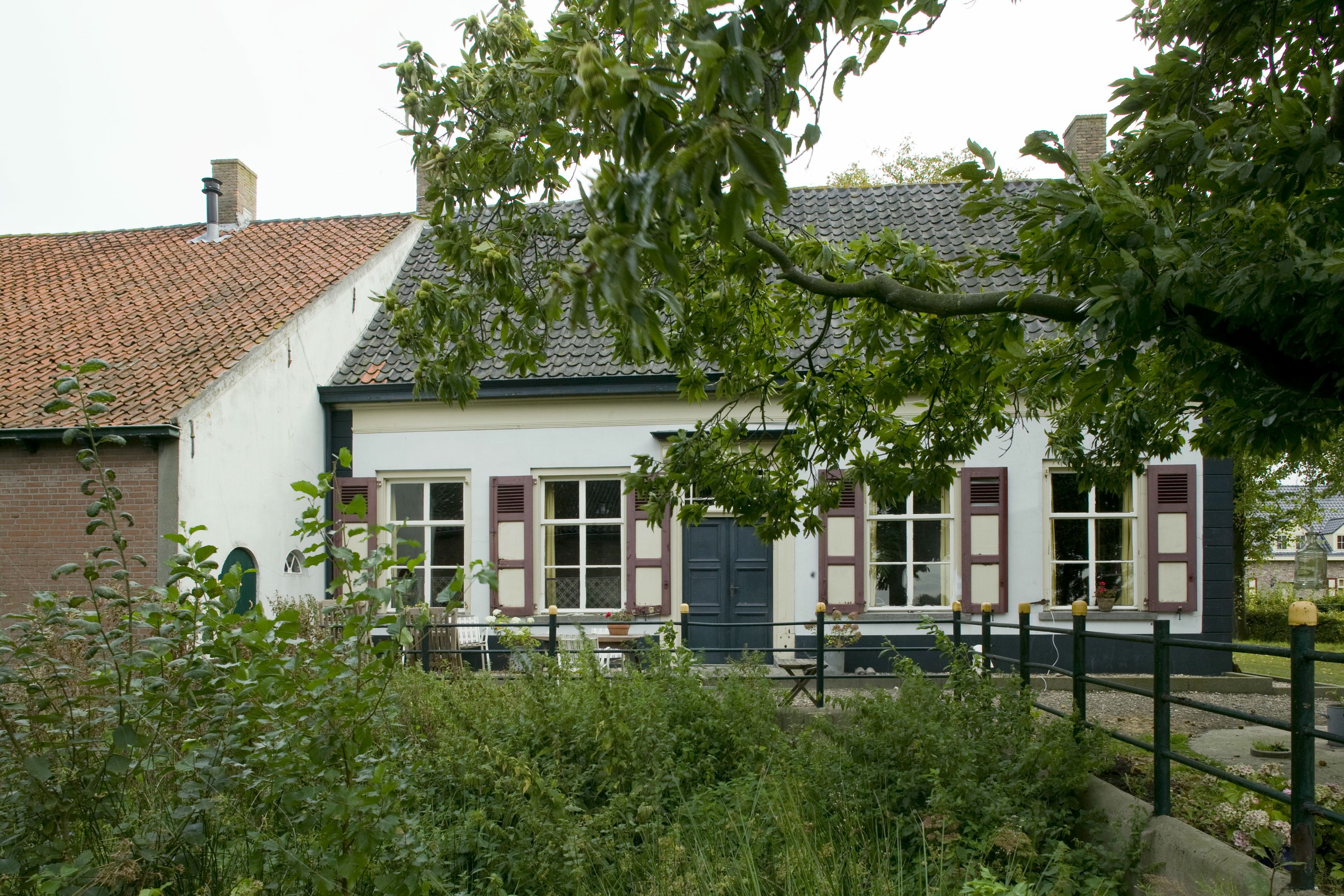
Farm in Halsteren

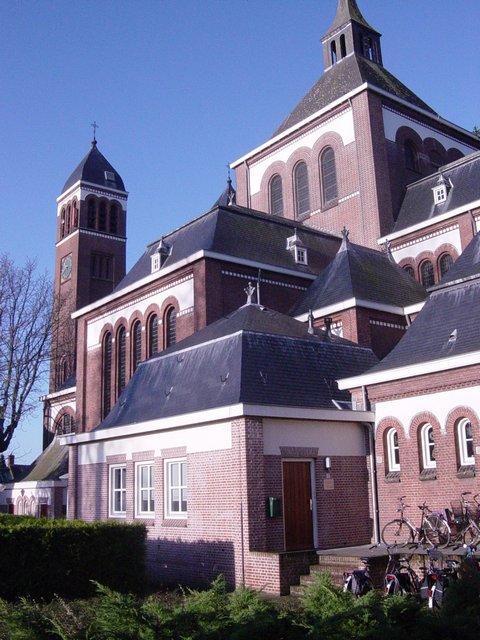
Quirinus Church

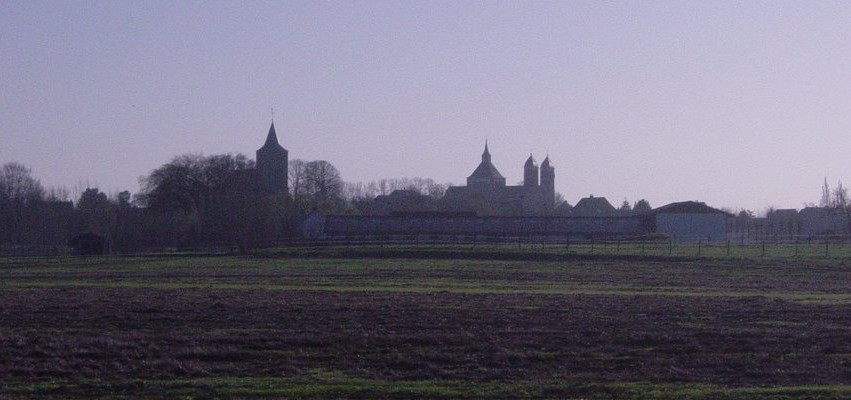
View on Halsteren
