= Hotel de Draak =

Hotel in Bergen op Zoom, Netherlands

- Native name: Grand Hotel the Draak
- Industry: Hotel
- Founded: 1397
- Headquarters: Grote Markt 36, Bergen op Zoom, Netherlands
- Key people: Frans Hazen (director/owner)
- Website: hoteldedraak.nl/website/en

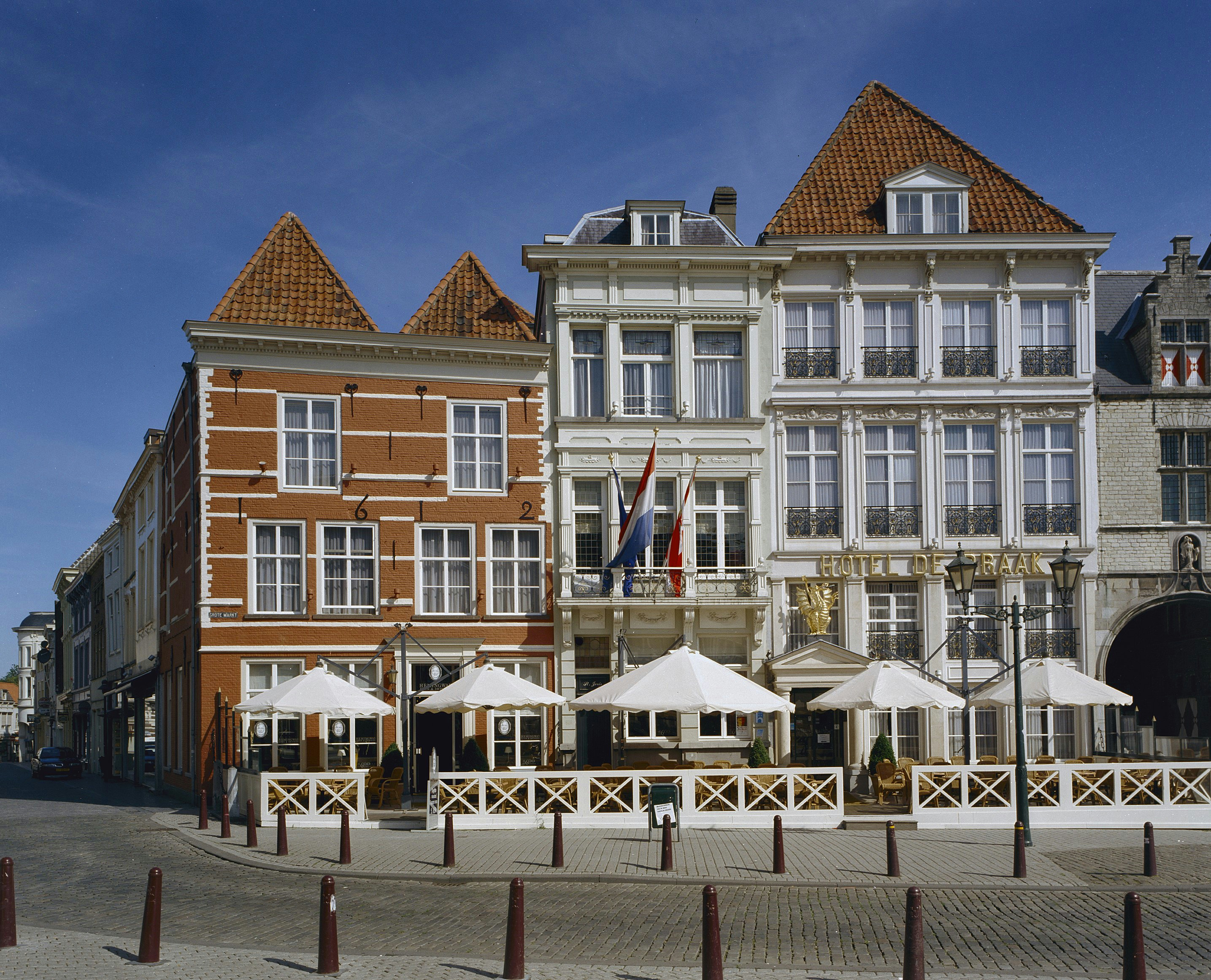
Hotel de Draak

Hotel de Draak is the oldest hotel in the Netherlands founded in 1397 and located in the historic center of Bergen op Zoom city. The current building is from 1500 and is a protected monument. The ground and first floor date from this period and were built in late-gothic style. The current front dates from the 19th century, in which the original crow-stepped gable was replaced with a cornice. It currently has a mansard and hip roof.

The building can be traced back to before the year 1397, in which a fire laid much of Bergen op Zoom in ashes. On the Grote Markt only de Draak and the adjacent building de Olifant survived the fire. It is possible that the building and hotel are older, since the city hall and its archives were destroyed in the fire as well.

In 2013, a big fire from a sauna on the 1st floor caused a lot of damage inside, but it was quickly reconstructed.

On 16 February 2016, The King and Queen of the Netherlands visited Grand Hotel the Draak and was welcomed by the owners, the Hazen family.

== See also ==
- List of oldest companies
