= De Groene Draeck =

Royal yacht of Beatrix of the Netherlands

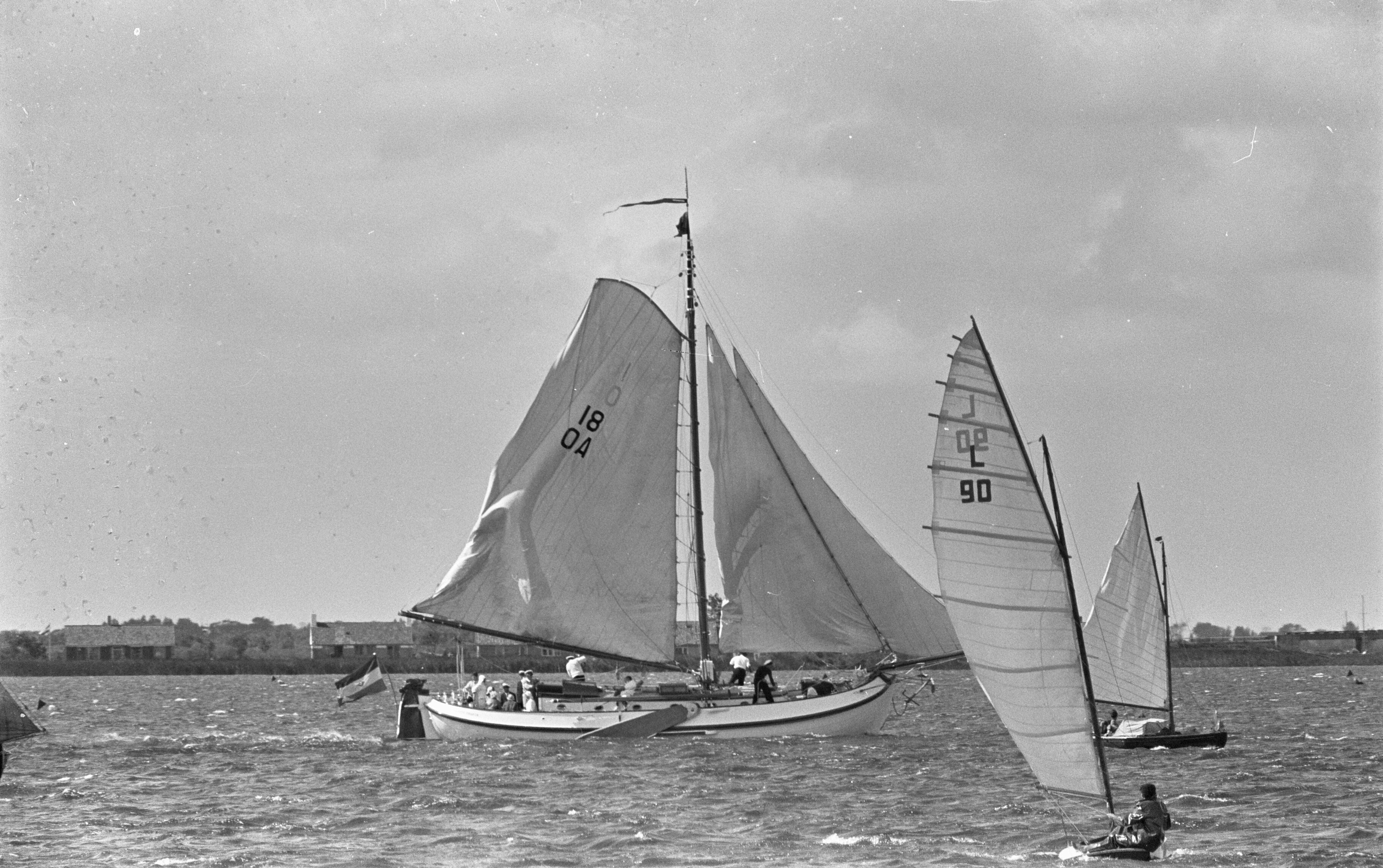
- De Groene Draeck at a sailing regatta, August 1959

History

Netherlands
- Name: De Groene Draeck
- Owner: Beatrix of the Netherlands
- Port of registry: Amsterdam
- Builder: G. de Vries Lentsch
- Launched: 1957
- Identification: VA 18
- Status: in active service, as of 2016

General characteristics
- Type: Lemsteraak
- Length: 15 m (49 ft 3 in) p/p
- Beam: 4.7 m (15 ft 5 in)
- Draught: 1 m (3 ft 3 in)
- Sail plan: Gaff rigged; Sail area 175 m^{2} (1,880 sq ft)

De Groene Draeck (English: The Green Dragon) is the royal yacht of Princess Beatrix of the Netherlands. It was named after the flagship of Piet Hein, a famous 17th century Dutch admiral.

De Groene Draeck is a traditional Dutch round bottomed sailing ship, built in 1957 in Amsterdam. She was presented by the Dutch people to Princess Beatrix for her 18th birthday. Her sail number is therefore VA 18.

The ship is regularly used by the Royal Family for sailing. The ship is usually moored in Muiden.
