= Wanneperveen =

- Village
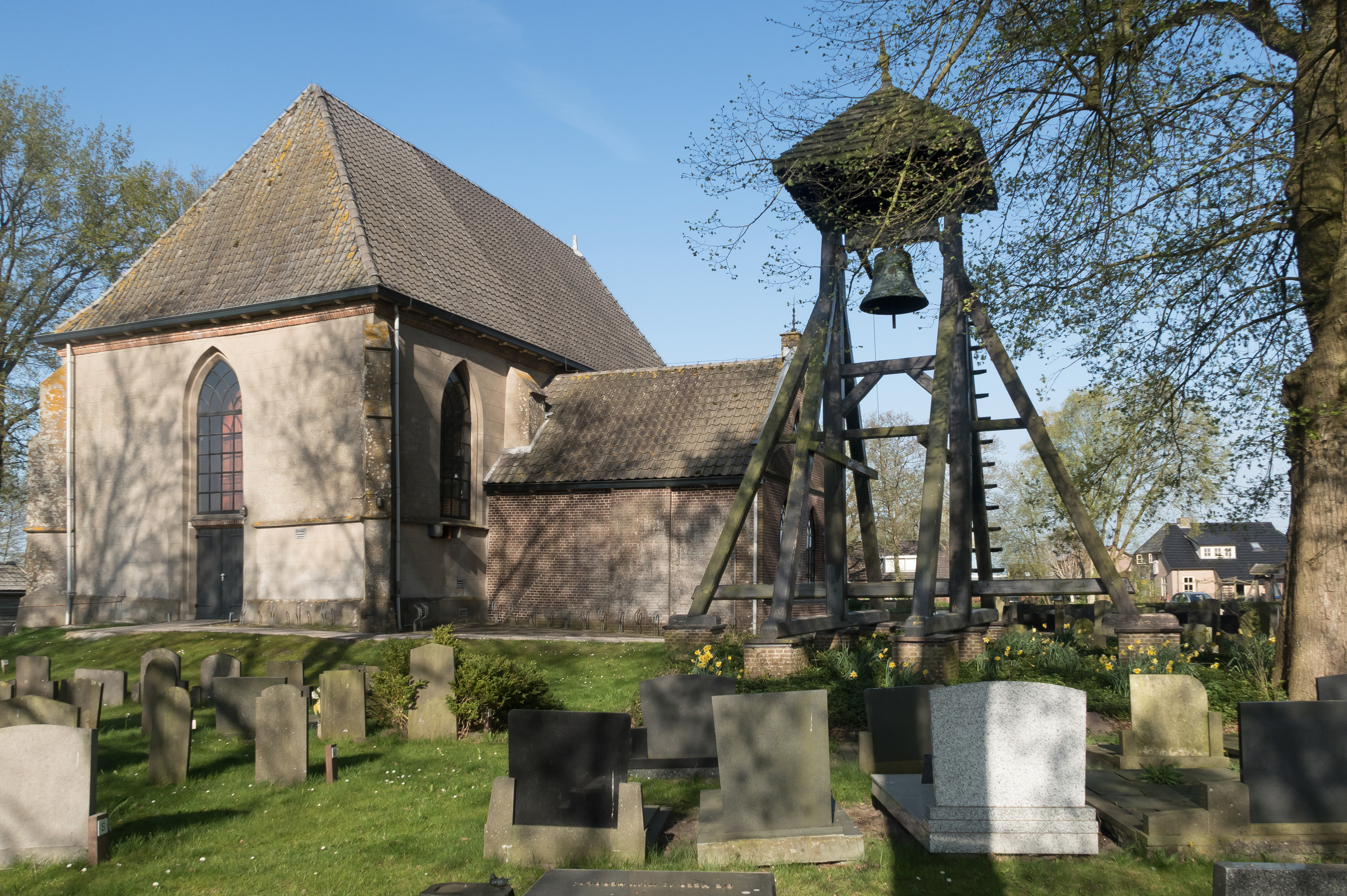
- Wanneperveen, reformed church with bell tower and consistory

- Flag

- Location in the Netherlands Wanneperveen (Netherlands)
- Coordinates: 52.7032°N 6.1237°E
- Country: Netherlands
- Province: Overijssel
- Municipality: Steenwijkerland

Area
  - Total: 35.01 km^{2} (13.52 sq mi)
- Elevation: 0 m (0 ft)

Population (2021)
  - Total: 1,745
  - Density: 49.84/km^{2} (129.1/sq mi)
- Time zone: UTC+1 (CET)
  - Summer (DST): UTC+2 (CEST)
- Postal code: 7946
- Dialing code: 0522

Wanneperveen is a village in the Dutch province of Overijssel. It is located in the municipality of Steenwijkerland, about 4 km west of Meppel.

Wanneperveen and the land around it sit right on the edge of Overijssel in a small pocket of land and, as such, are no more than fifteen kilometres from the borders of Friesland, Drenthe and Flevoland.

== History ==
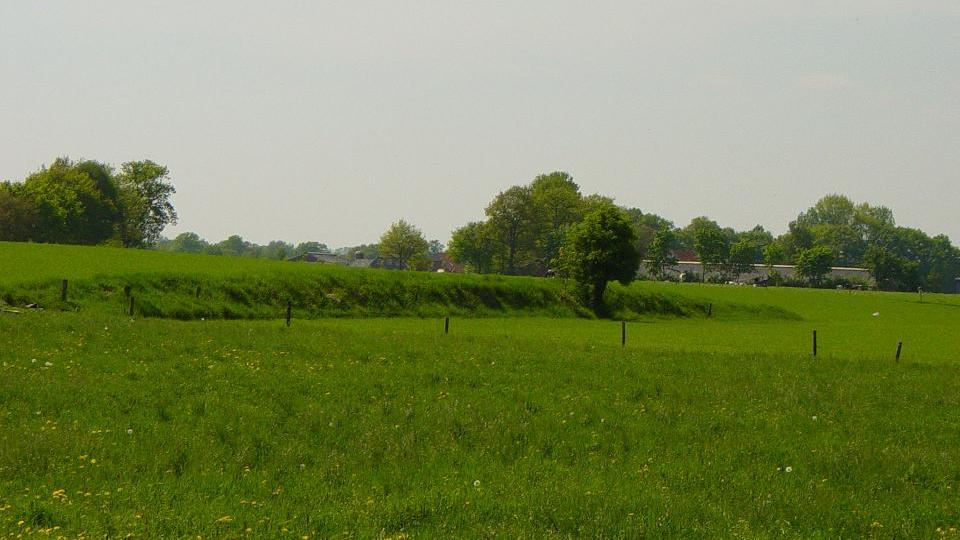
Sand ridge in Gelderland

=== Pleistocene ===
During the late Pleistocene, there were no glaciers where Wanneperveen lies, but there were periglacial effects. Due to a low amount of vegetation during the Last Interglacial, sand was easily blown around by the wind, but during the Weichselian, more vegetation caused sand ridges to form. Most of these have been covered due to geographical events in the past 12000 years, some places having found these features a whole three meters underground, but some are still visible.

=== Middle ages ===
During the middle ages, in the early 12th century, settlement north of the Meppelerdiep (Sethe at that time) began. It is possible that Wanneperveen existed in 1210, due to the existence of a villa called Wanepe, which anyhow, does prove that there was an amount of settlement in the area.

=== Modern era ===
In the early modern era, Wannerperveen, and its neighbouring villages were mainly populated by peatworkers. This, however led to dedragation of the landscape, not yet present further north. In 1769 and 1806, resolutions were made, outlying how far peat cutters had to stay from roads, dikes, and canals.

=== 20th century onwards ===
Wanneperveen was a separate municipality until 1973, when it became a part of Brederwiede. In 2001 Brederwiede was merged with nearby Steenwijk to form Steenwijkerland

== Economy ==
The village has not much economic activities. Originally it was a peat harvesting area, which caused the area to form as it is with the many canals and lakes. In the 20th century it was mainly agricultural with the farms located along the main road through the village and the fields behind it. Only a few active farms remain. At present the main local "industry" is tourism. Many tourists come to the area, which includes the "Venice of the North" Giethoorn and the lakes like the Beulake- and Belterwijde. Wanneperveen offers a number of campings and marinas.

In the winter, if the ice on the canals and lakes permits ice skating the area attracts skaters from all the country. The village has an active ice-club. The club has a natural ice ice rink and they organize long distance tours when possible.

== Notable people ==
- Albertus van Raalte, one of the main founders of Hope College in Holland, Michigan, United States.
- Angelique Hoorn - Dutch showjumper
