= Hof van Sonoy =

Defunct restaurant in Blokzijl, Netherlands

Coordinates: 52°43′37.84″N 5°57′38.82″E

- Interactive map of Hof van Sonoy

Restaurant information
- Established: 1998
- Closed: 8 November 2008
- Head chef: Paul van Staveren
- Food type: French, Mediterranean
- Rating: Michelin Guide
- Location: Kerkstraat 9, Blokzijl, 8356 DN, Netherlands

Hof van Sonoy is a defunct restaurant in Blokzijl, Netherlands. It was a fine dining restaurant that was awarded one Michelin star in 2005 and retained that rating until 2008.

Owner and head chef of Hof van Sonoy was Paul van Staveren.

Restaurant Hof van Sonoy was located in a refurbished 19th century school.

The restaurant lost its star in 2008, when the restaurant was closed. The owner moved the restaurant to Emmeloord and opened the restaurant there as Sonoy.

Hof van Sonoy was a member of Alliance Gastronomique Néerlandaise since 2006.

== See also ==
- List of Michelin starred restaurants in the Netherlands
- Sonoy
