= Sonoy =

Coordinates: 52°42′35.26″N 5°45′3.47″E

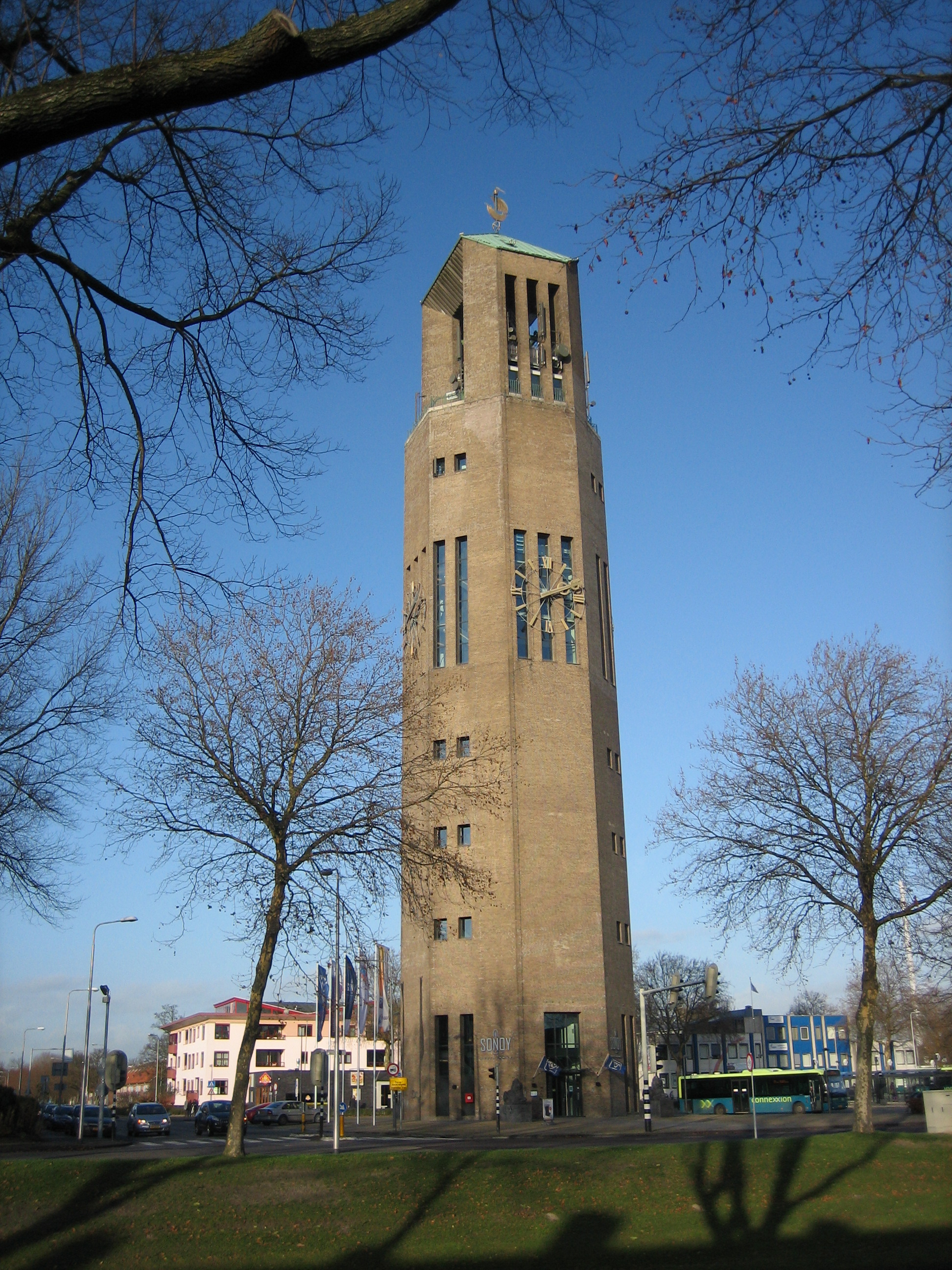
- Interactive map of Sonoy

Restaurant information
- Established: 24 February 2009
- Closed: 1 July 2013
- Head chef: Paul van Staveren
- Food type: French, Mediterranean
- Rating: Michelin Guide
- Location: De Deel 25E, Emmeloord, 8302 EK, Netherlands
- Seating capacity: 55
- Website: Official website

Sonoy was a restaurant located in Emmeloord, in the Netherlands. It held a Michelin-star rating in the period 2010–2013.

Owner and head chef of Sonoy was Paul van Staveren.

The restaurant was a member of Alliance Gastronomique Néerlandaise since 2006.

Restaurant Sonoy was located in a former water tower, at a height of 40 meters. It occupied four floors. During the transfer from the old location in Blokzijl to this one, which took five weeks, the staff worked in De Librije in Zwolle.

In 2010, the restaurant won the "Sustainable Restaurant of the Year" award from Gault Millau.

The Michelin star awarded in 2010 was the first one ever awarded in the (young) province of Flevoland.

In March 2013, the municipality of Noordoostpolder, owner of the water tower in which the restaurant was housed, reviewed the future of the tower. A failed renovation caused too many problems. The restaurant closed per 1 July 2013. Paul van Staveren received a compensation of about €275,000, but still lost about half of the money he invested in the restaurant in 2010, based on a ten-year tenancy contract.

== See also ==
- List of Michelin starred restaurants in the Netherlands
- Hof van Sonoy
