= Oldemarkt =

Oldemarkt Ooldemark
- Village
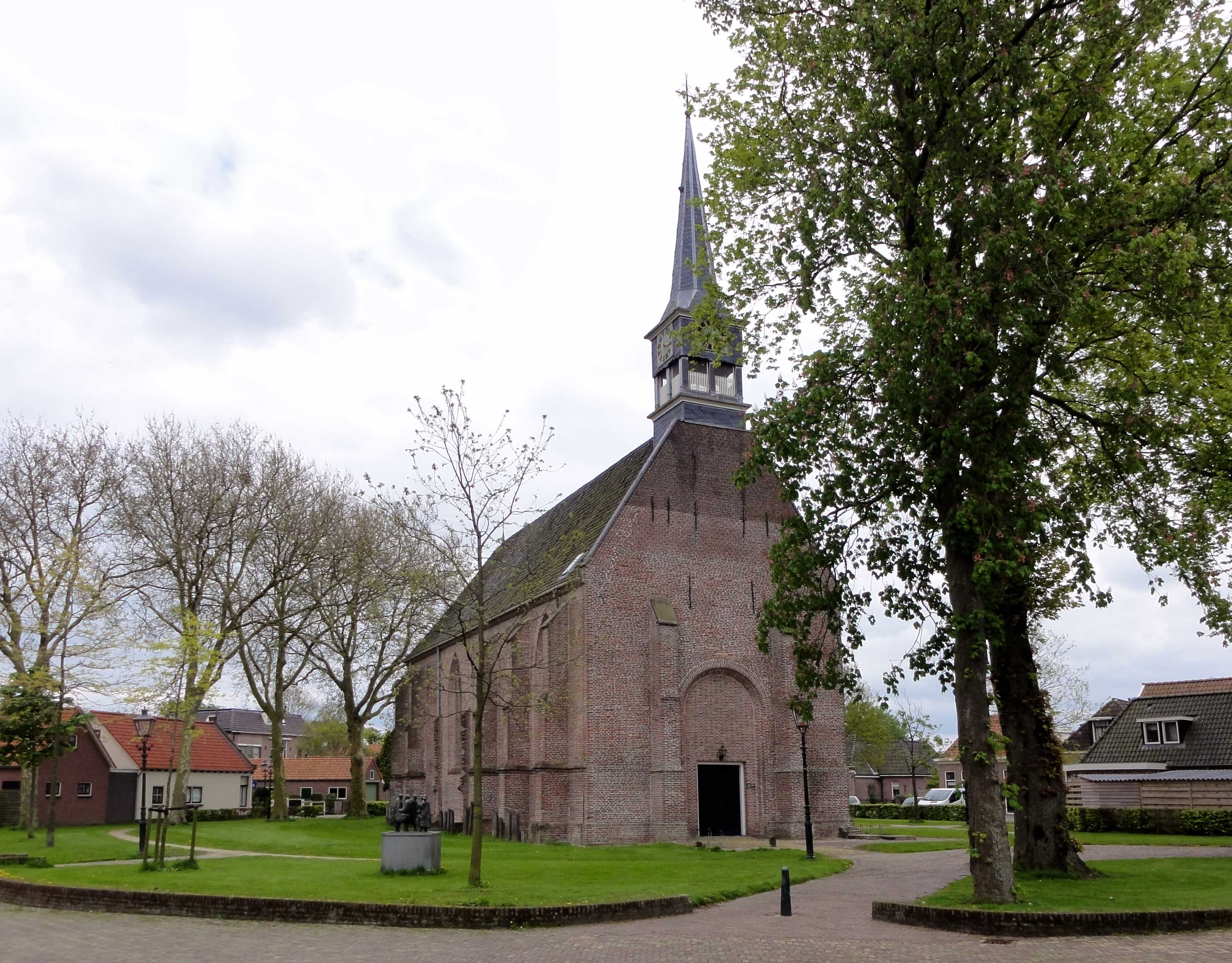
- Reformed church of Oldemarkt

- Flag Coat of arms

- Location in the Netherlands Oldemarkt (Netherlands)
- Coordinates: 52°49′12″N 5°58′25″E
- Country: Netherlands
- Province: Overijssel
- Municipality: Steenwijkerland

Area
  - Total: 9.88 km^{2} (3.81 sq mi)
- Elevation: 2 m (6.6 ft)

Population (2021)
  - Total: 2,550
  - Density: 258/km^{2} (668/sq mi)
- Time zone: UTC+1 (CET)
  - Summer (DST): UTC+2 (CEST)
- Postal code: 8375
- Dialing code: 0561

Oldemarkt (Stellingwerfs: Ooldemark) is a village in the Dutch province of Overijssel. It is located in the municipality of Steenwijkerland, about 12 km west of Steenwijk. Oldemarkt was a separate municipality until 1973, when it became a part of IJsselham.

== History ==
It was first mentioned in 1336 as Dodovene meaning "Bog of Dodo (person)". In 1448 it became "den Olden markt" meaning "the old market". In 1448, a chapel was built which was elevated to church in 1489. Oldemarkt was known for its butter market which moved to Wolvega in 1925. In 1840, it was home to 1,983 people.

In 1973, it ceased to be an independent municipality, however the town hall of IJsselham remained in Oldemarkt. In 2001, it was merged into Steenwijkerland.

== Gallery ==
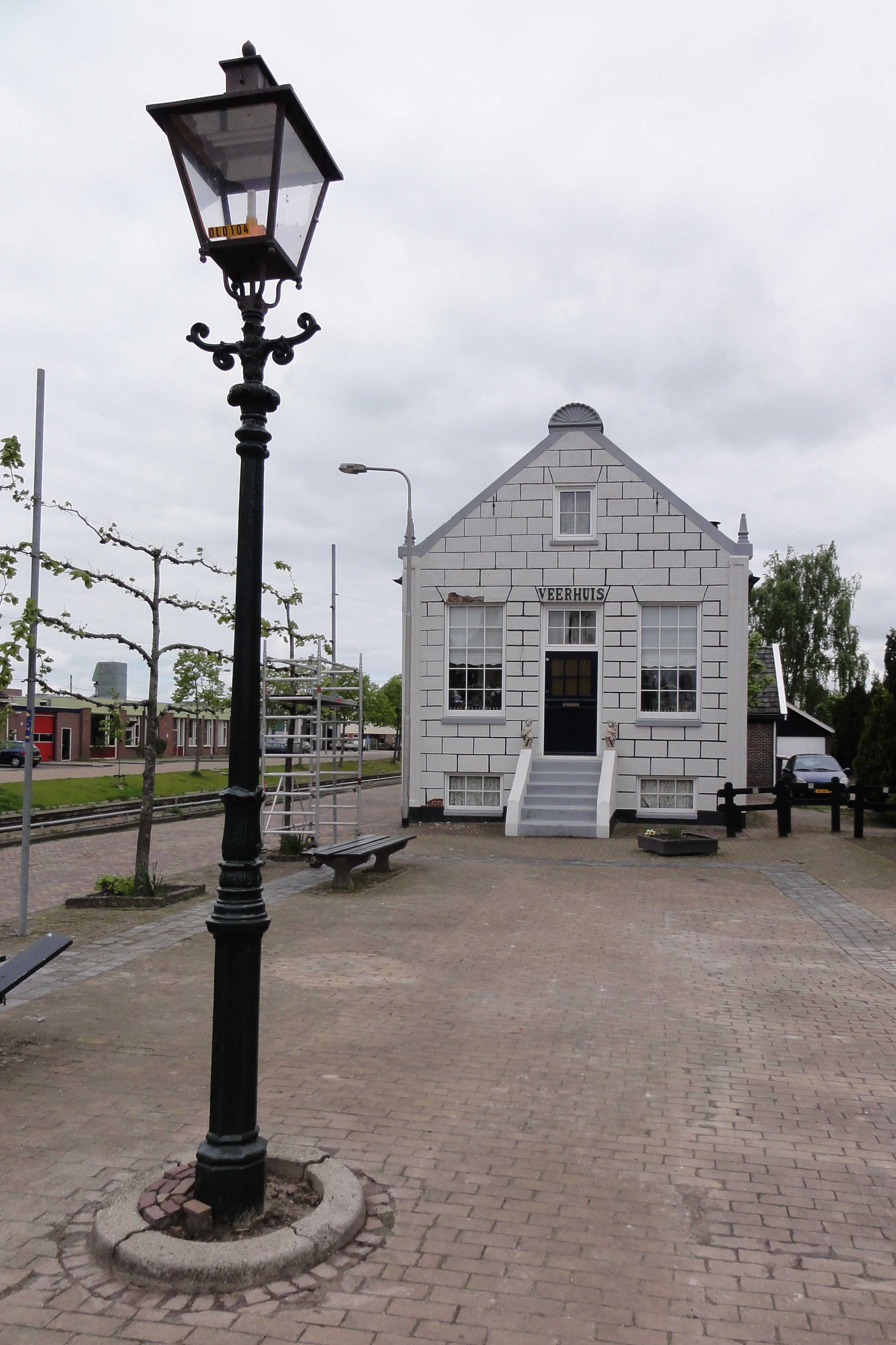
Ferry house in Oldemarkt

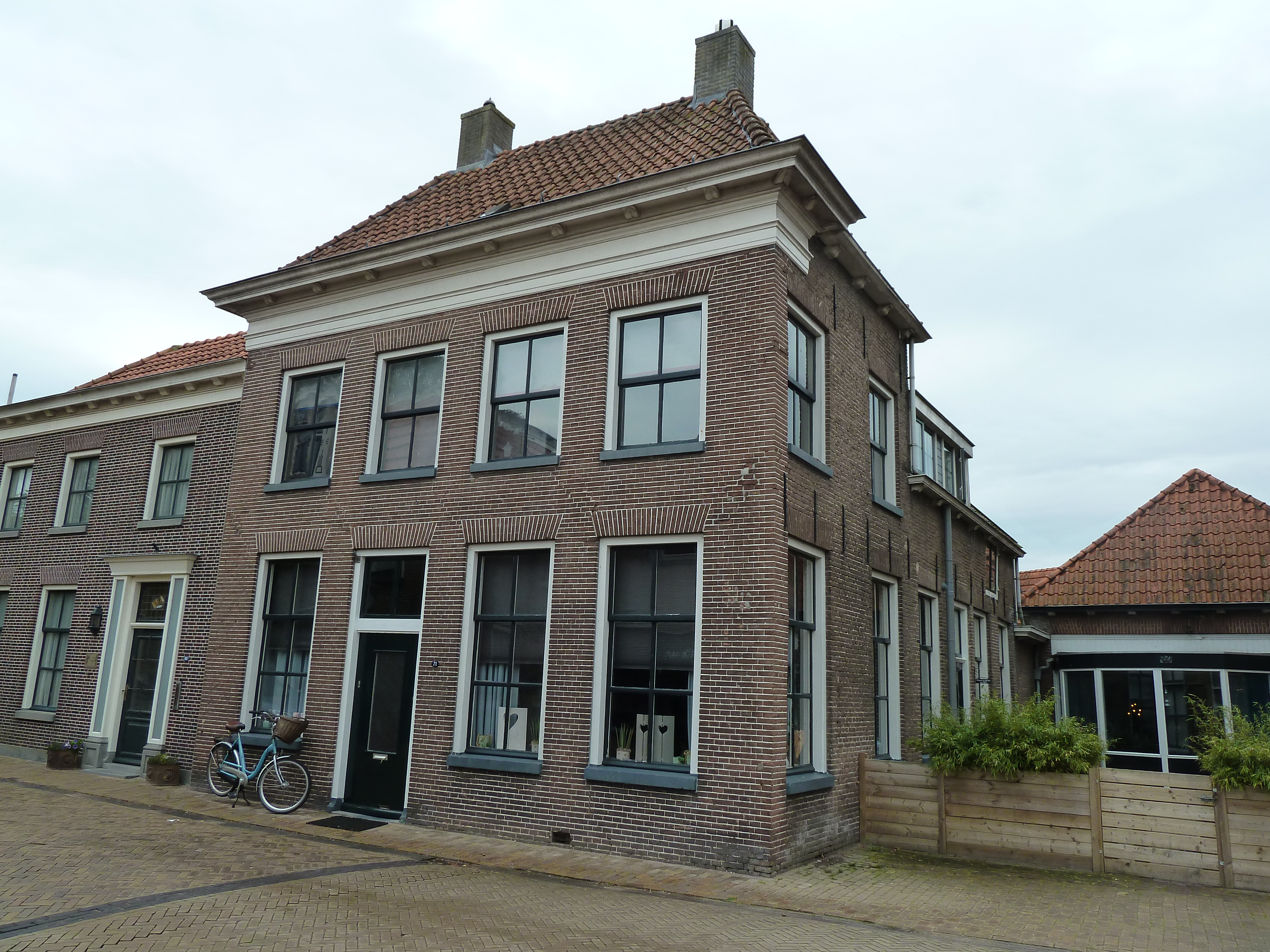
Shop and residential home

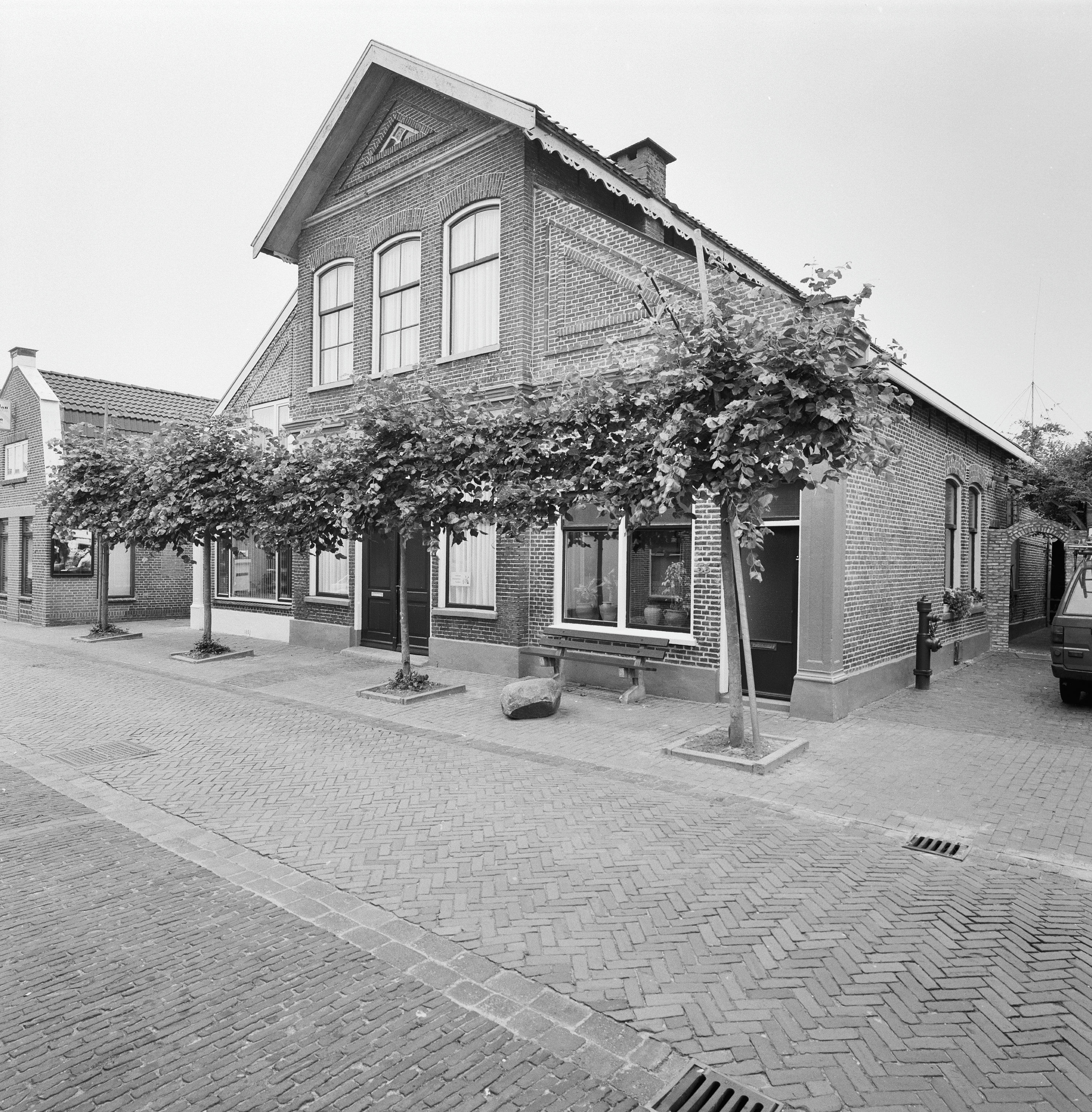
Former school

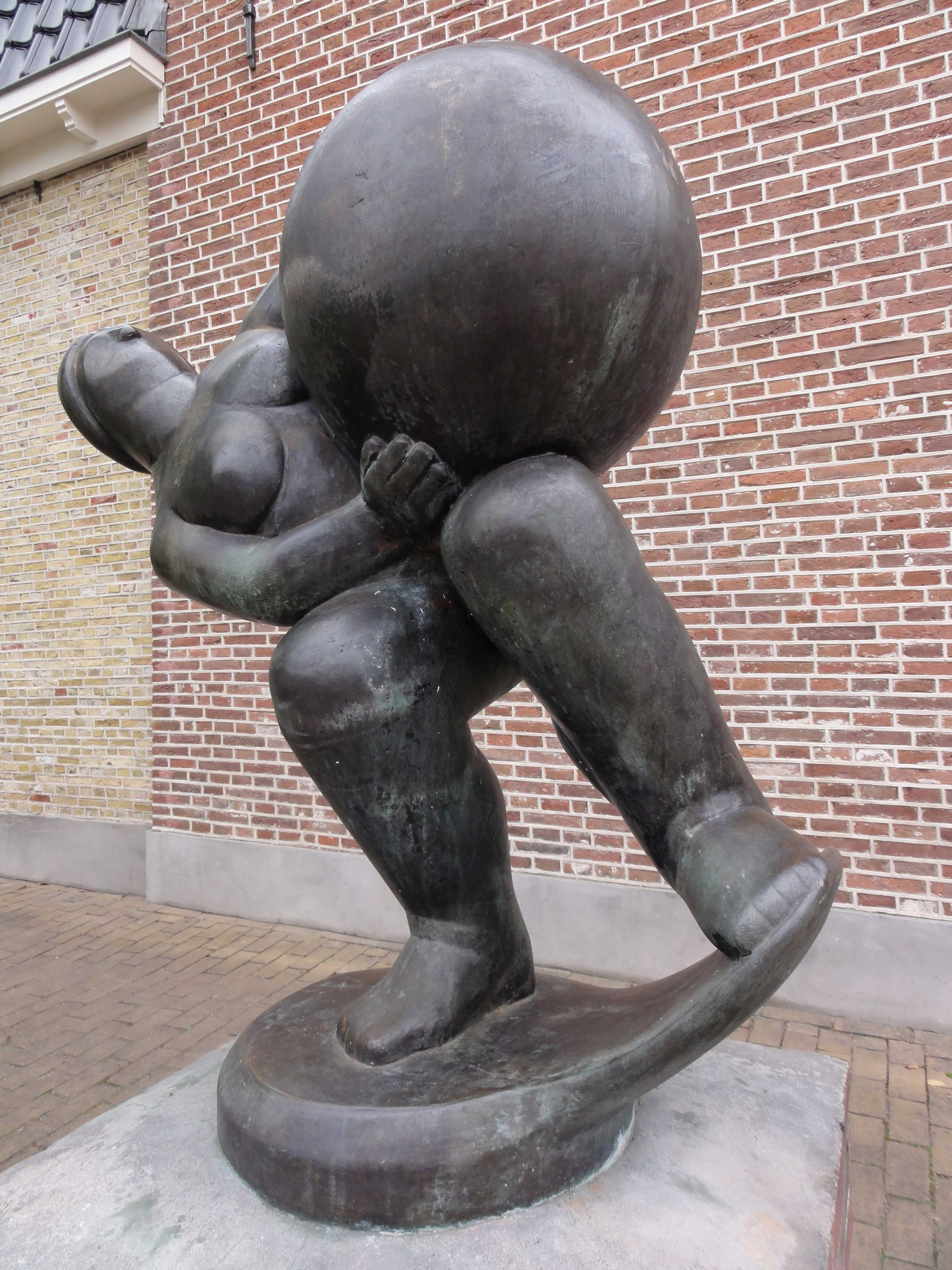
The load carrier by Henny Zandjans
