= Giethoorn =

Village in Overijssel, Netherlands

- Village
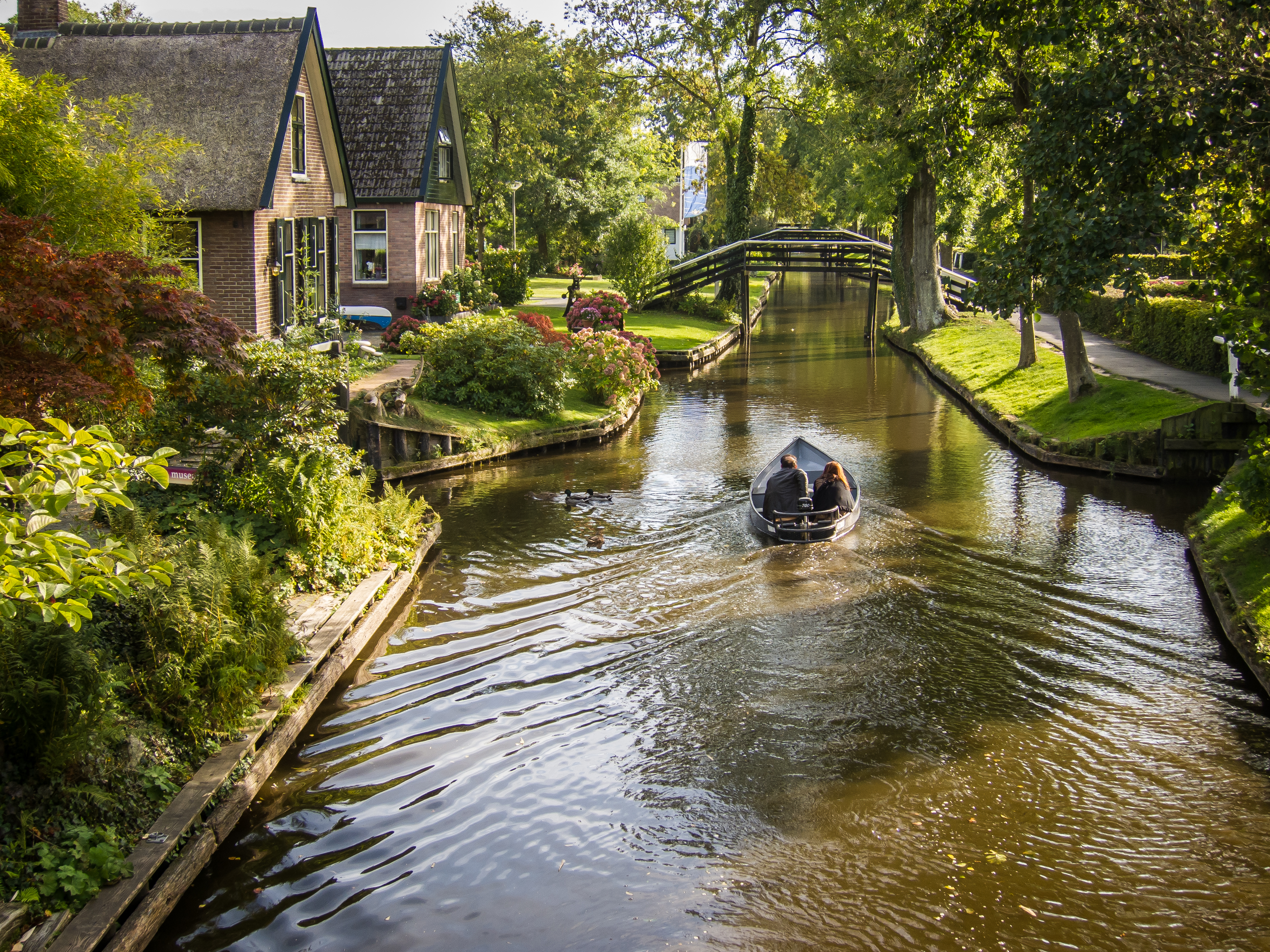
- The village in 2014

- Flag Coat of arms
- Nicknames: Venice of the North; Venice of the Netherlands
- Location in Overijssel
- Coordinates: 52°44′20″N 6°4′41″E
- Country: Netherlands
- Province: Overijssel
- Municipality: Steenwijkerland

Area
  - Total: 38.47 km^{2} (14.85 sq mi)
- Elevation: −0.3 m (−0.98 ft)

Population (2021)
  - Total: 2,805
  - Density: 72.91/km^{2} (188.8/sq mi)
- Time zone: UTC+1 (CET)
  - Summer (DST): UTC+2 (CEST)
- Postal code: 8355
- Dialing code: 0521

Giethoorn (Dutch pronunciation: [ˈɣitɦoːr(ə)n]) is a village in the province of Overijssel, Netherlands, with a population of 2,795 in 2020. It is located in the municipality of Steenwijkerland, about 5 km (3.1 mi) southwest of Steenwijk. As a popular Dutch tourist destination both within the Netherlands and abroad, Giethoorn is often referred to as "Dutch Venice" (Dutch: Hollands Venetië) or the "Venice of the Netherlands".

== History ==
Giethoorn used to be a pedestrian precinct, but nowadays exceptions are made. It became locally famous, especially after 1958, when the Dutch filmmaker Bert Haanstra made his famous comedy Fanfare there. In the old part of the village, there were no roads (though a cycling path was eventually added), and all transport was undertaken by water over one of the many canals. The lakes in Giethoorn were formed by peat digging.

Giethoorn was a separate municipality until 1973, when it became part of Brederwiede, which subsequently lost its municipality status in 2001 to merge with Steenwijk.

== Tourism ==
Tourism is the main source of income. The village is known as the Venice of the North or Venice of the Netherlands. Giethoorn has 176 bridges.

=== Monopoly edition ===
In 2015, the village of Giethoorn was chosen from 182 contenders across the world to achieve a place on the board of the new international edition of Monopoly. An online campaign led by local Village Marketeer Giethoorn.com resulted in enough votes to obtain spot number 21 in the special edition.

== Notable people ==
- Jonnie Boer (1965–2025), Michelin star winning head chef.
