= IJsselham =

- Hamlet
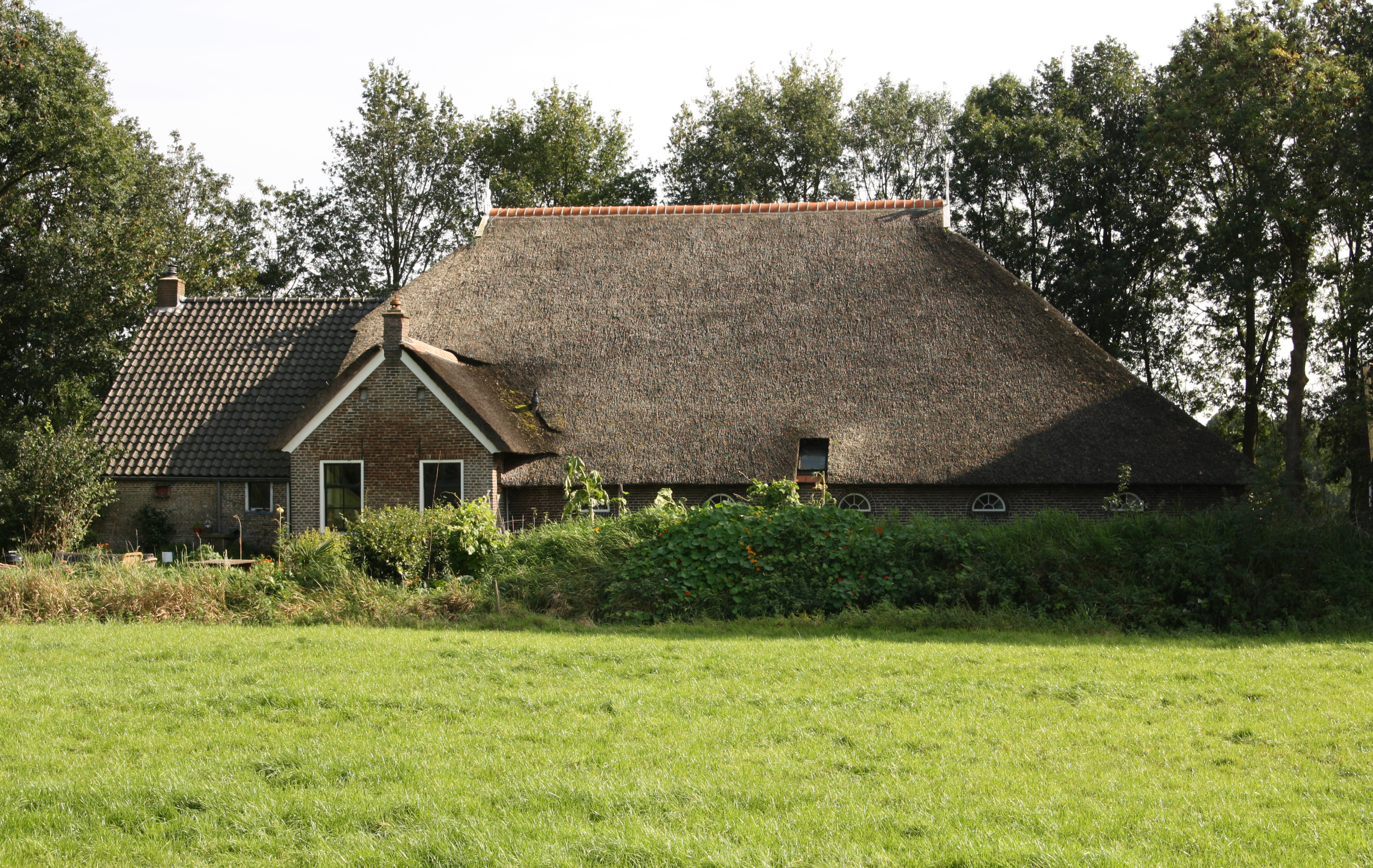
- Farm in IJsselham

- Location in the Netherlands IJsselham (Netherlands)
- Coordinates: 52.8078°N 5.9564°E
- Country: Netherlands
- Province: Overijssel
- Municipality: Steenwijkerland

Area
  - Total: 3.74 km^{2} (1.44 sq mi)
- Elevation: 2 m (6.6 ft)

Population (2021)
  - Total: 85
  - Density: 23/km^{2} (59/sq mi)
- Time zone: UTC+1 (CET)
  - Summer (DST): UTC+2 (CEST)
- Postal code: 8361
- Dialing code: 0561

IJsselham is a hamlet in the Dutch province of Overijssel. It is located in the municipality of Steenwijkerland, about 12 km west of Steenwijk, and 2 km southwest of Oldemarkt.

IJsselham lent its name to a former municipality, created in the merger of Blankenham, Kuinre, and Oldemarkt. The municipality merged with Steenwijk in 2001.

It was first mentioned in 1245 as Sileham. Even though it seemingly relates to the IJssel River, there is no relation. In 1840, it was home to 123 people.

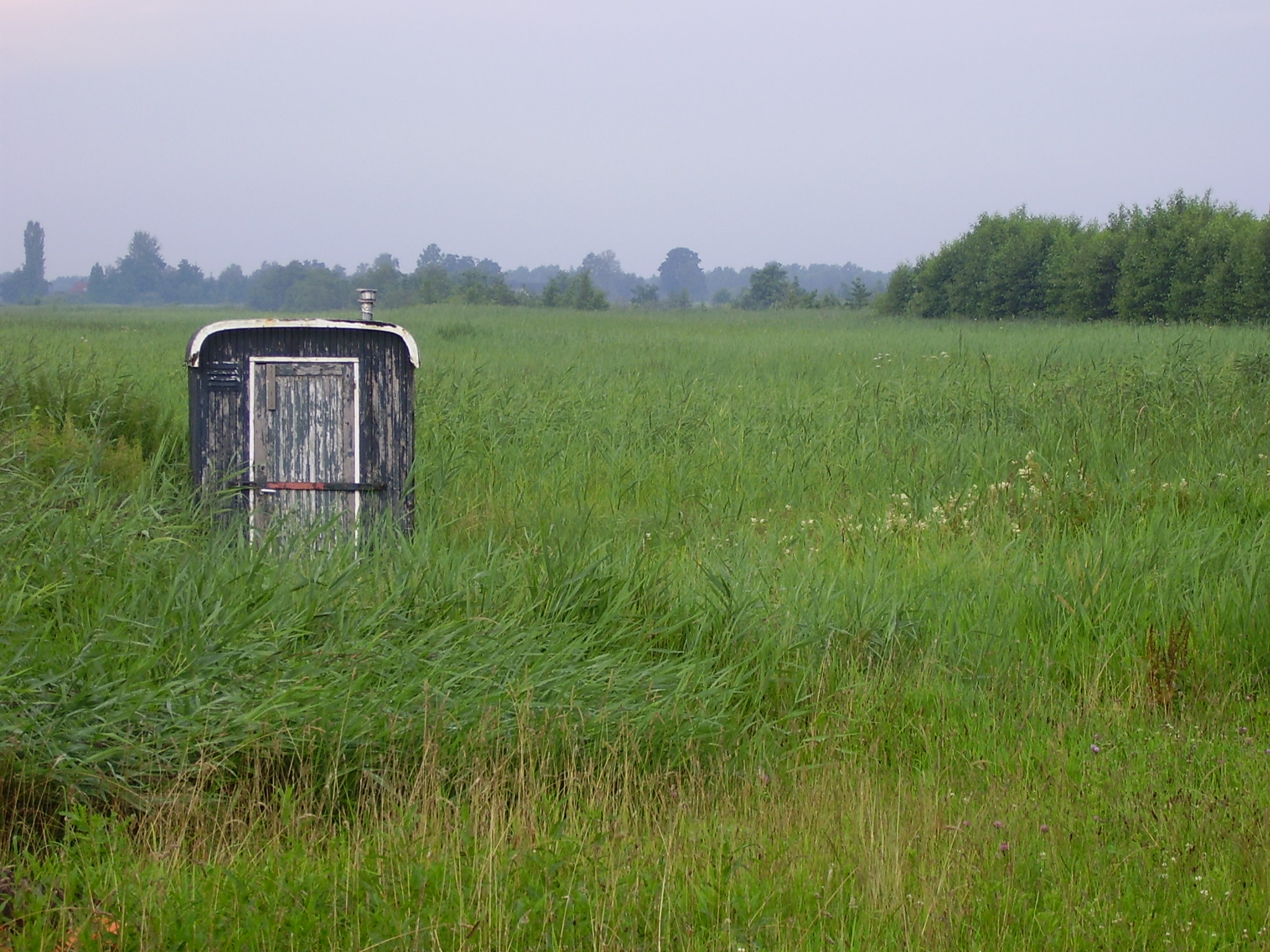
Lonely hut near IJsselham
