= Klaas Jan Pen =

Dutch sports shooter

Personal information
- Born: 2 October 1874 Kuinre, Netherlands
- Died: 21 April 1932 (aged 57) The Hague, Netherlands

Sport
- Sport: Sports shooting

Klaas Jan Pen (2 October 1874 – 21 April 1932) was a Dutch sports shooter. He competed in the shooting at the 1920 Summer Olympics, but the exact event is unknown.
