= Kuinre =

Kuinre De Kuunder
- Village
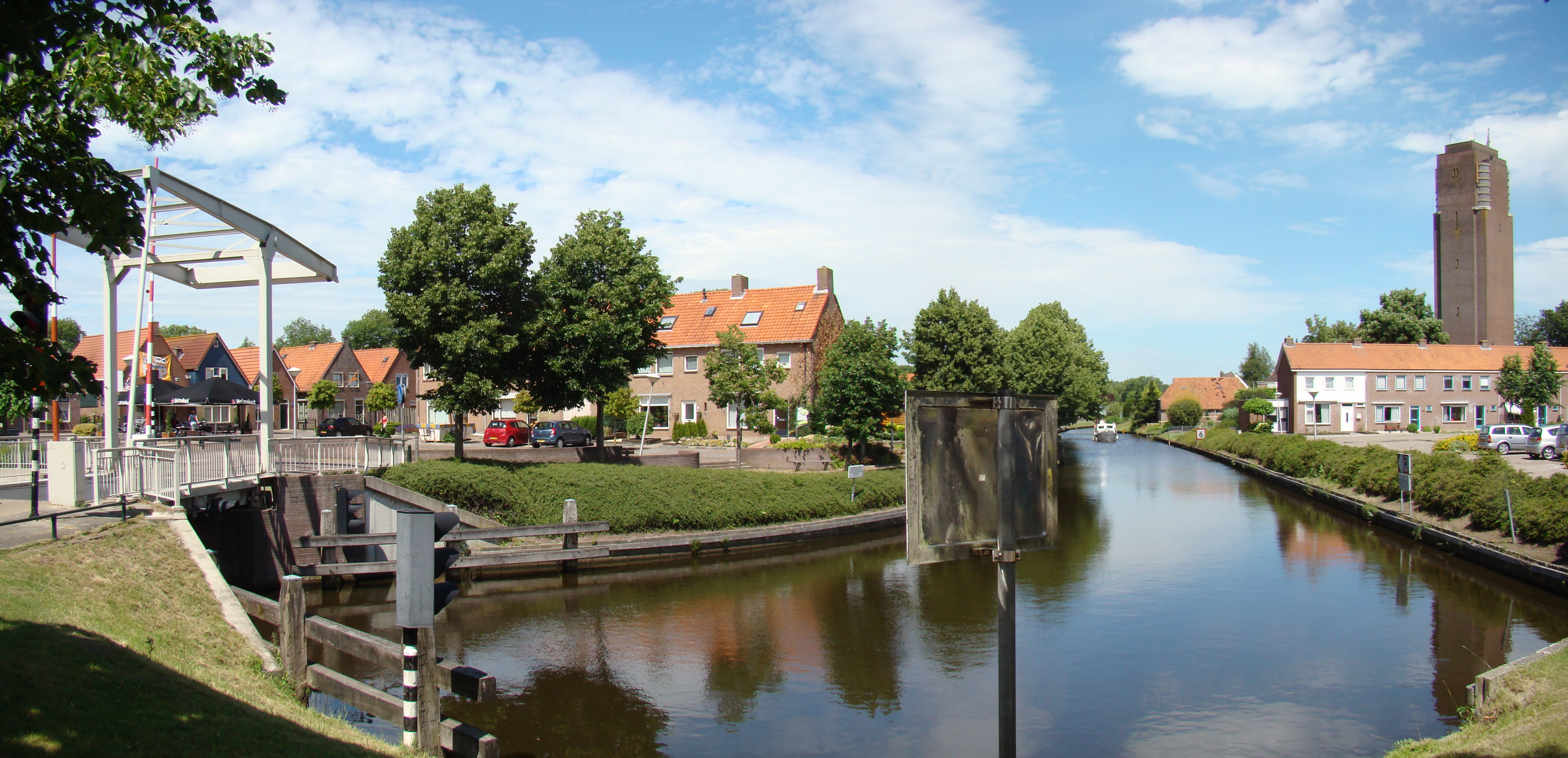
- Skyline of Kuinre

- Flag Coat of arms

- Location in the Netherlands Kuinre (Netherlands)
- Coordinates: 52°47′11″N 5°50′36″E
- Country: Netherlands
- Province: Overijssel
- Municipality: Steenwijkerland

Area
  - Total: 13.10 km^{2} (5.06 sq mi)
- Elevation: 0 m (0 ft)

Population (2021)
  - Total: 930
  - Density: 71/km^{2} (180/sq mi)
- Time zone: UTC+1 (CET)
  - Summer (DST): UTC+2 (CEST)
- Postal code: 8374
- Dialing code: 0527

Kuinre (Low Saxon: De Kuunder) is a village in the Dutch province of Overijssel. It was a separate municipality until 1973, when it became a part of IJsselham, which in turn merged into the municipality of Steenwijkerland in 2001.

Kuinre is a former harbour town with a rich history. Back in the days of the Zuiderzee, Kuinre's harbour was an important port of the Zuiderzee. After completion of the Noordoostpolder Kuinre became landlocked; companies, shops, and fishermen went out of business.

== History ==
Kuinre is a village which developed at the mouth of the Tjonger and the Linde. Around 1165, a castle was built about one kilometre south of the settlement by the Prince-bishop of Utrecht. In 1196, the castle was destroyed by the Count of Holland. In 1376, Kuinre provided shelter for pirates. In 1385, it was given buurrecht, significant privileges. In 1672, Kuinre was destroyed by the Prince-Bishop of Münster. Later, it became a quiet fishing harbour. The excavation of peat resulted in a revival as an export harbour. In 1840, it was home to 870 people.

The Afsluitdijk, closure dike which turned the Zuiderzee into a lake, resulted in an economic decline. In 1939, a petition was signed by 348 of the 372 voters to transfer Kuinre from Overijssel to Friesland, because Kuinre felt neglected by the province, and thought that its independence as a municipality was threatened. The petition was ignored. In 1973, it ceased to be an independent municipality.

== Notable people ==
- Klaas Jan Pen (1874–1932), sports shooter who competed at the 1920 Summer Olympics

== Gallery ==
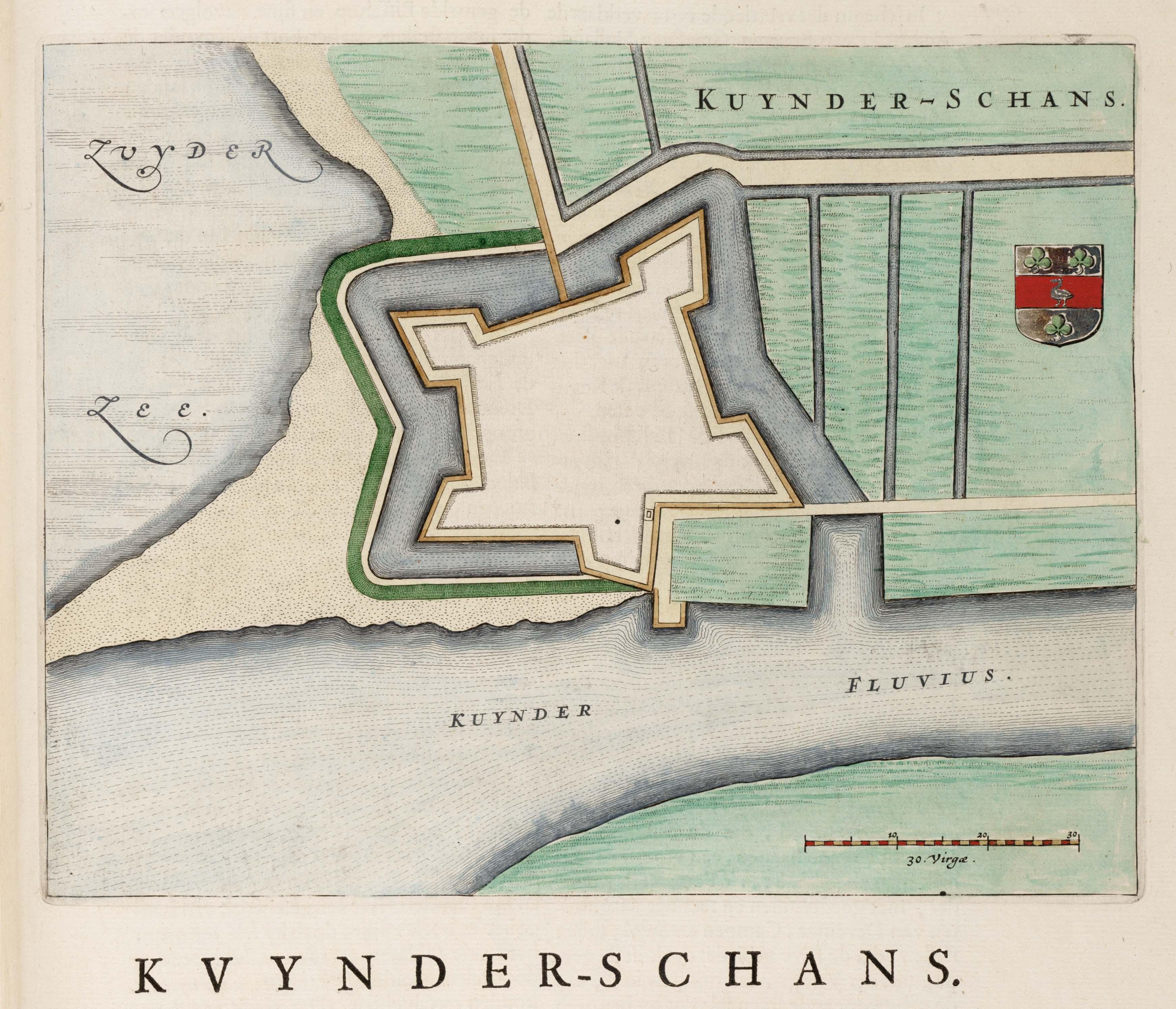
fort Kynder - Atlas van Loon (1649)

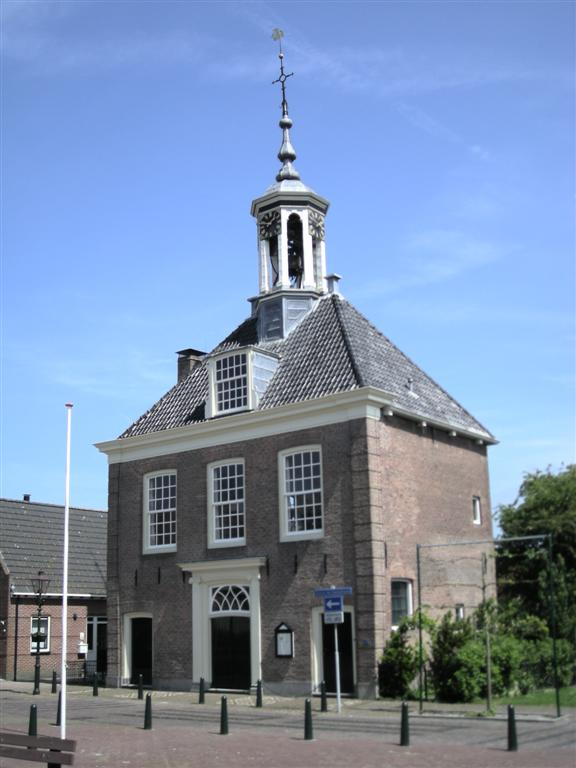
Waag

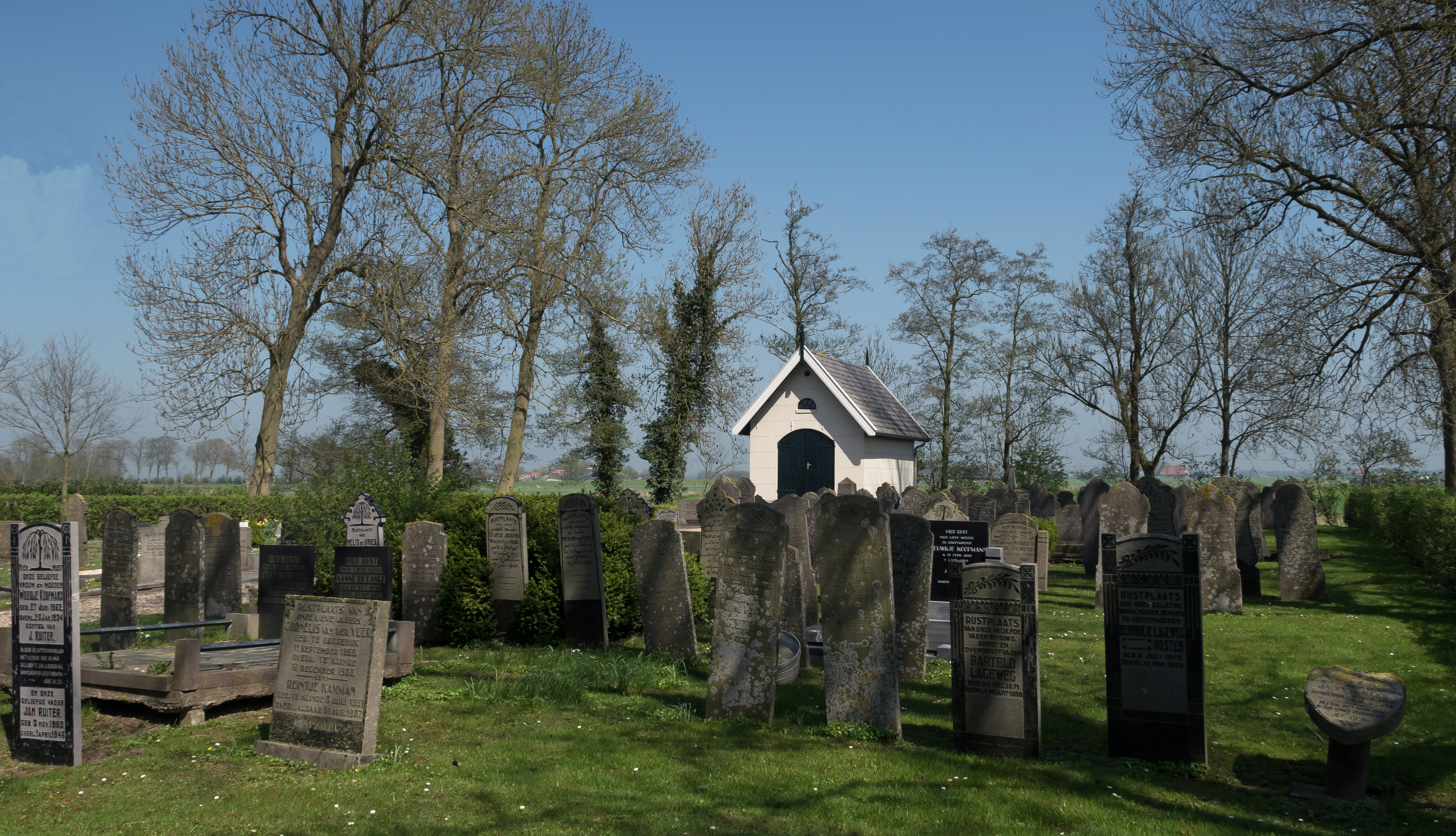
General Cemetery

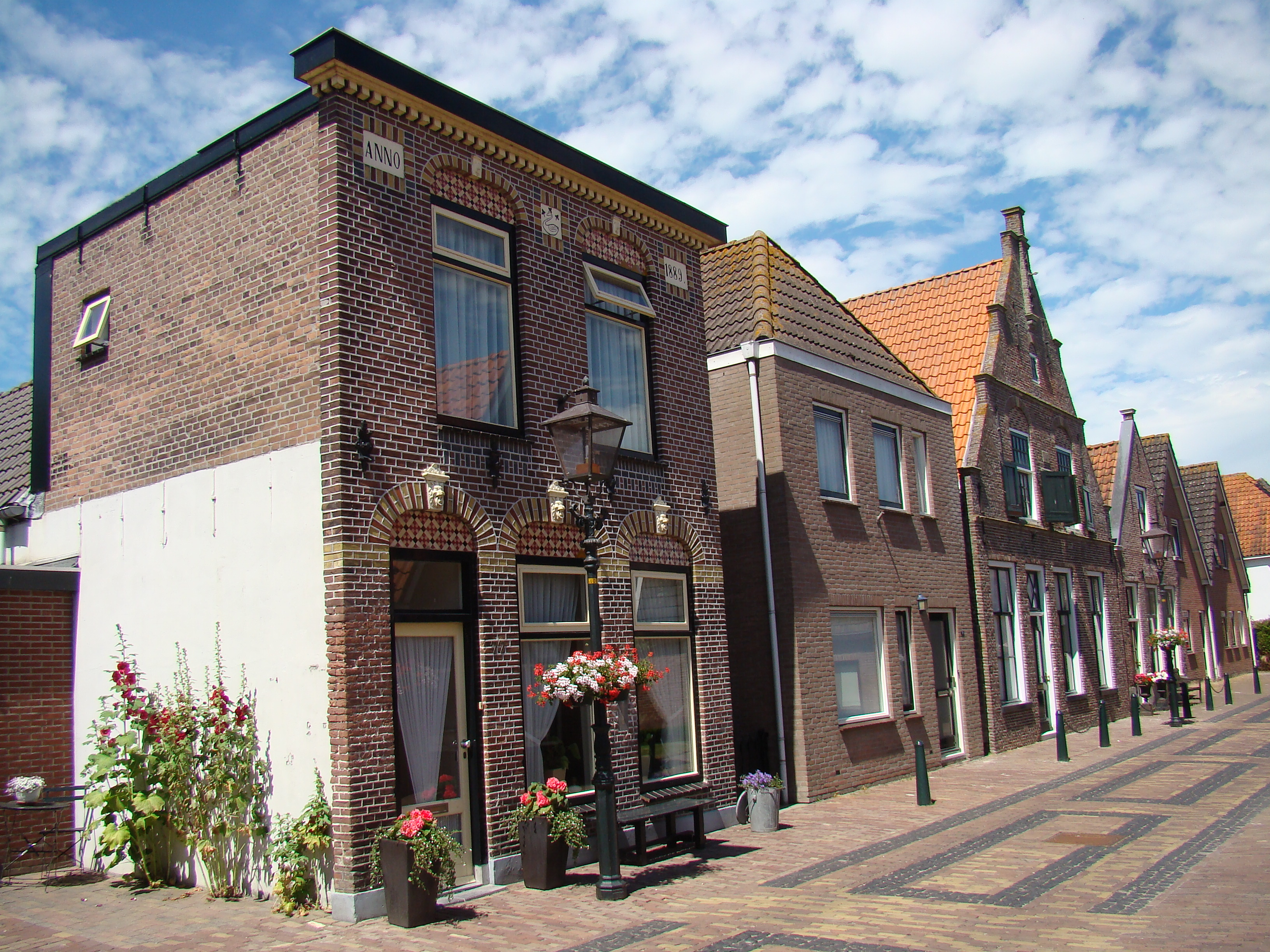
Street
