= Brederwiede =

Coordinates: 52°43′N 6°02′E

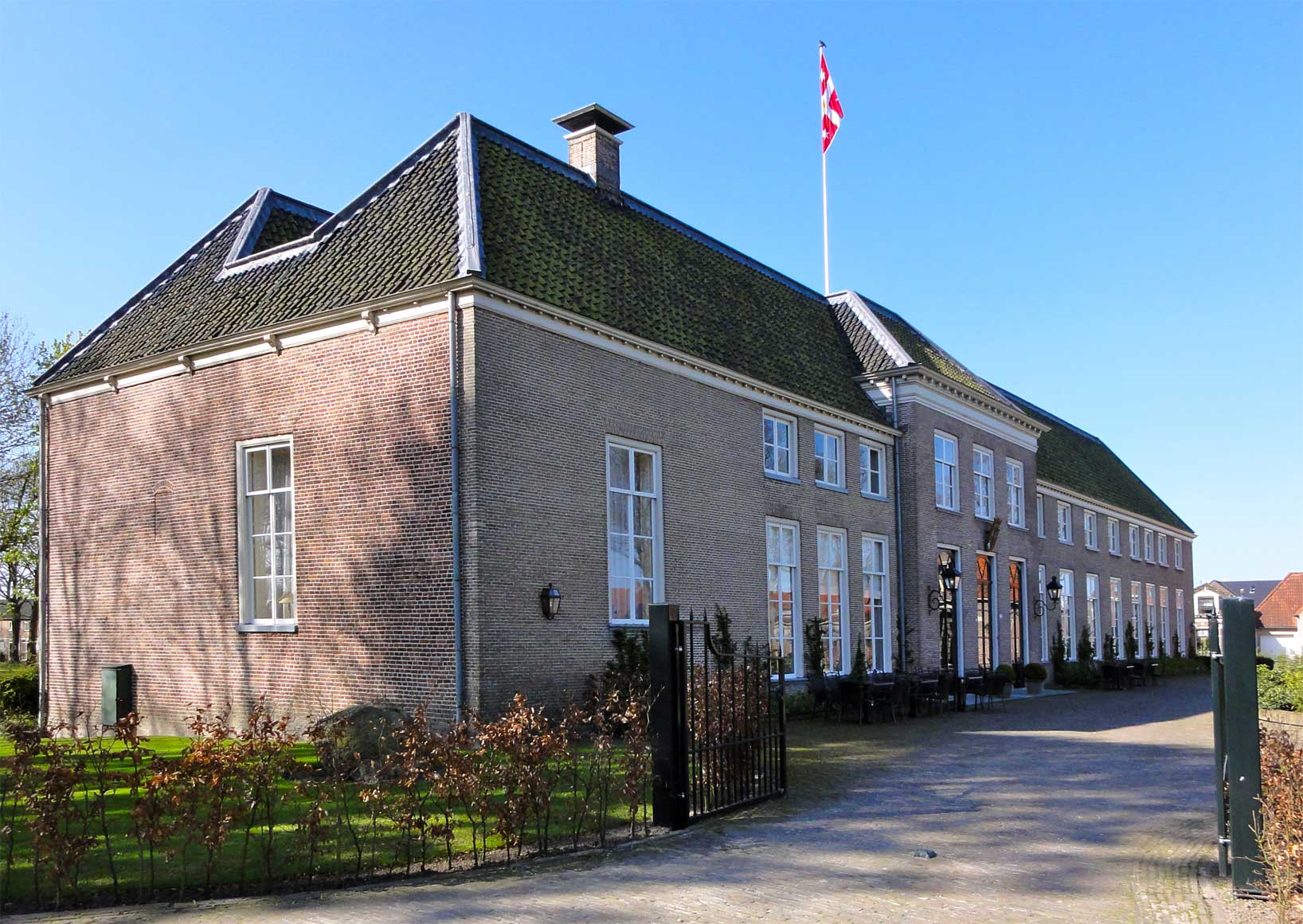

Brederwiede is a former municipality in the Dutch province of Overijssel. It was created in a merger of Blokzijl, Giethoorn, Vollenhove, and Wanneperveen in 1973, and existed until it became a part of Steenwijk in 2001 (since 2003: Steenwijkerland).
