= Blokzijl =

- City
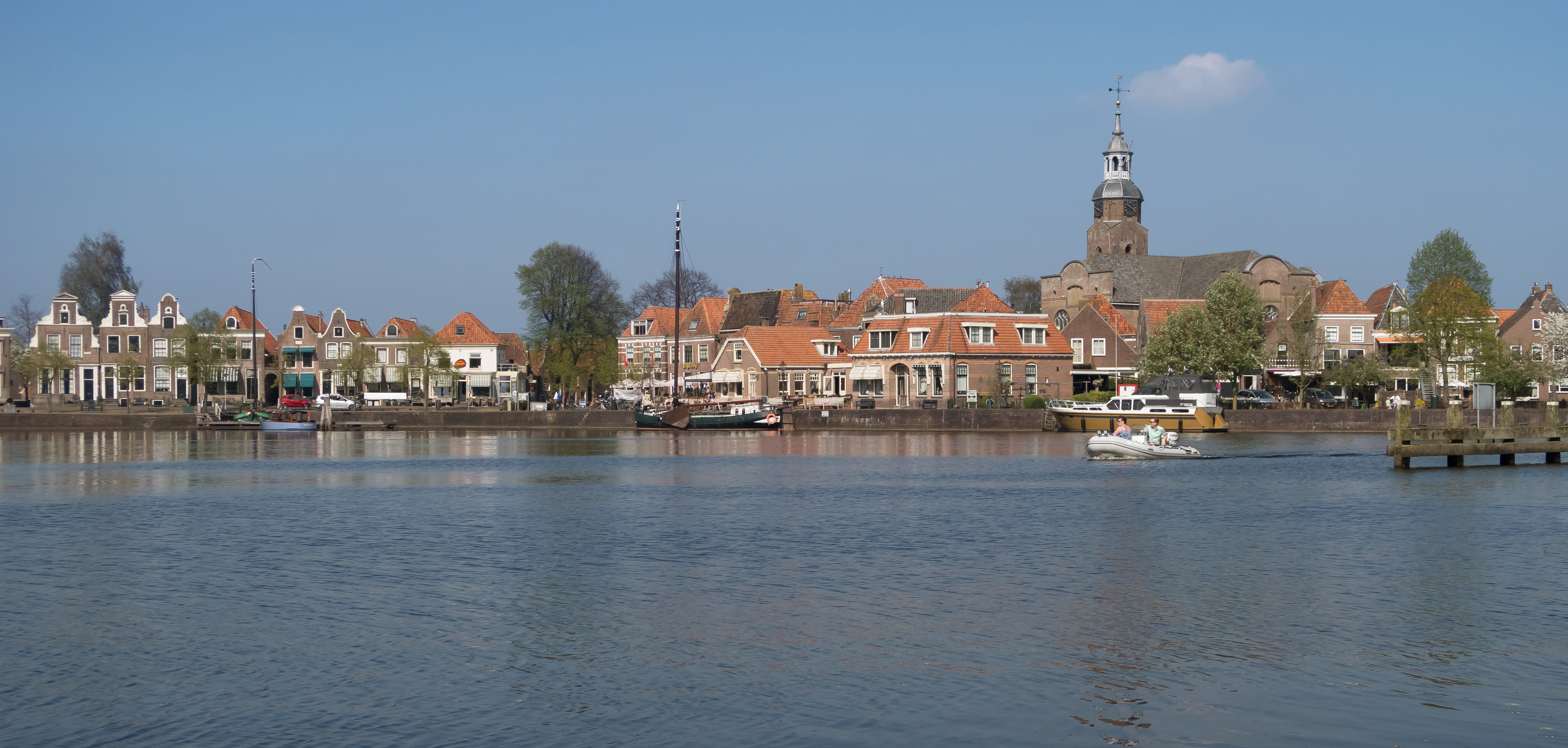
- View on the city

- Flag Coat of arms

- Location in the Netherlands Blokzijl (Netherlands)
- Coordinates: 52°43′35″N 5°57′42″E
- Country: Netherlands
- Province: Overijssel
- Municipality: Steenwijkerland

Area
  - Total: 16.28 km^{2} (6.29 sq mi)
- Elevation: 1 m (3.3 ft)

Population (2021)
  - Total: 1,400
  - Density: 86/km^{2} (220/sq mi)
- Time zone: UTC+1 (CET)
  - Summer (DST): UTC+2 (CEST)
- Postal code: 8356
- Dialing code: 0527

Blokzijl is a small city located southwest of Steenwijk in the province of Overijssel, the Netherlands. The city is a major tourist destination near the De Weerribben-Wieden National Park and attracts many water sports enthusiasts.

Blokzijl was founded in the 1580s as a trading post for peat. After the Siege of Steenwijk (1580–81) in the Eighty Years' War, the Dutch built a fortified lock or in local dialect zijl or siel. The monumental houses around the picturesque harbour were built during 17th century. Blokzijl received city rights in 1672, but was stripped of them a few years later. Until 1973, it was a separate municipality, when it became a component of the new municipality Brederwiede; it is now part of Steenwijkerland.

One the interesting sights of the city is an old cannon, located on the harbour quay. This cannon was not used for defense purposes, but as a warning device during storm and high tide. Flooding was a real danger before the Noordoostpolder and the Afsluitdijk were constructed in the 1930-40's. One residential building shows the height the water reached during a flood in 1825. In 1926, a fire destroyed part of the centre and damaged the church.

== Gallery ==
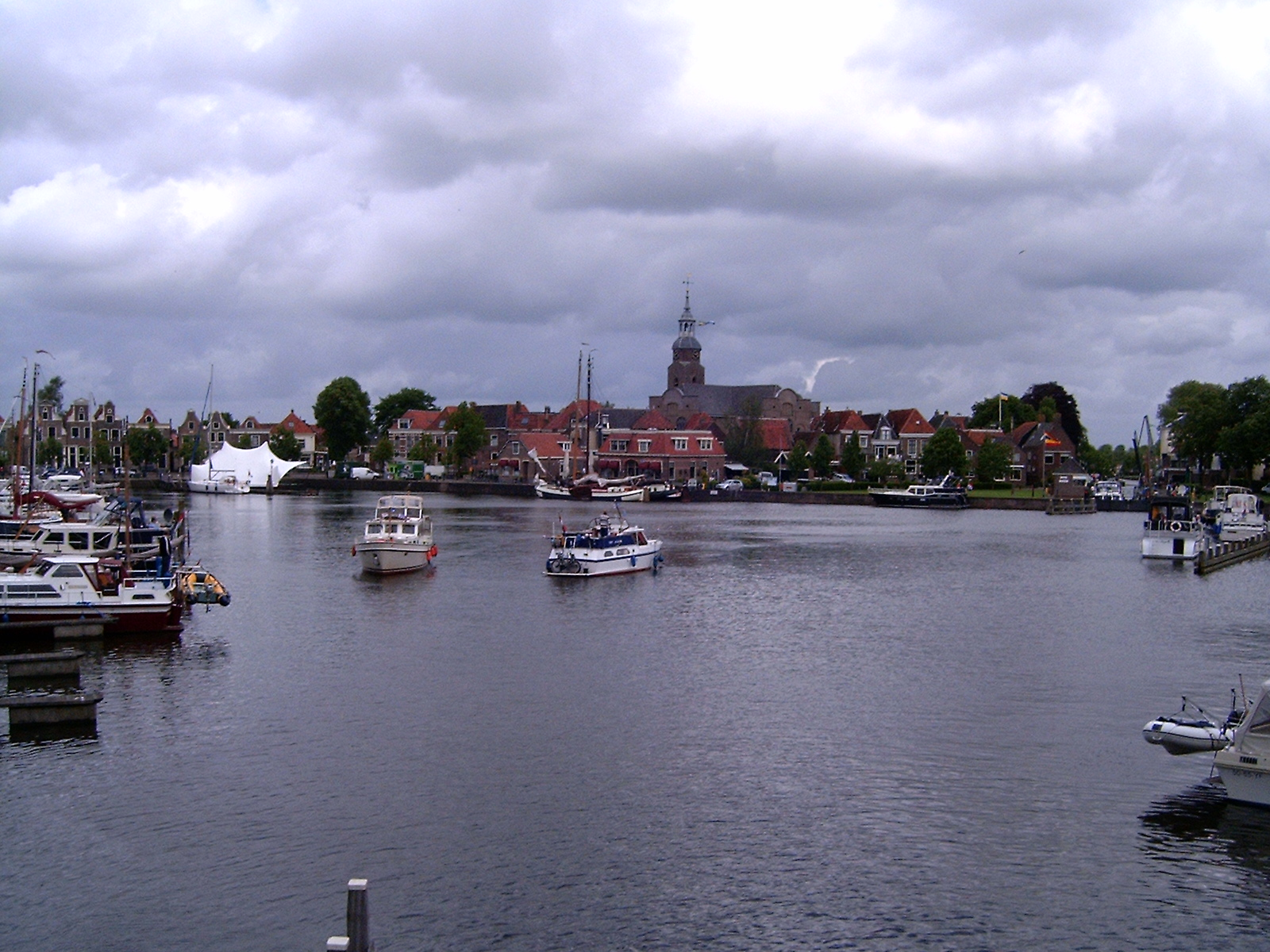
Blokzijl harbour

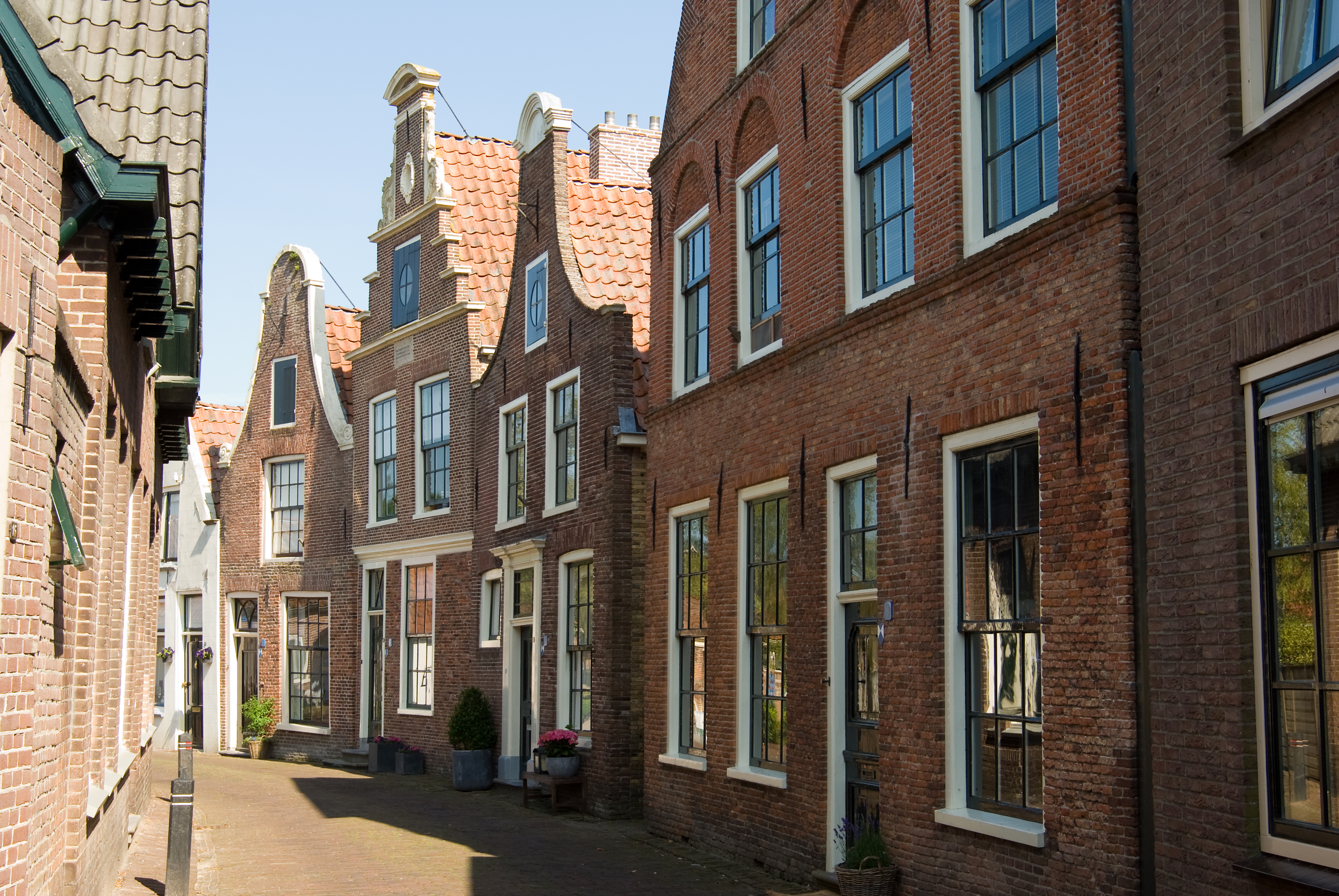
Street of Blokzijl

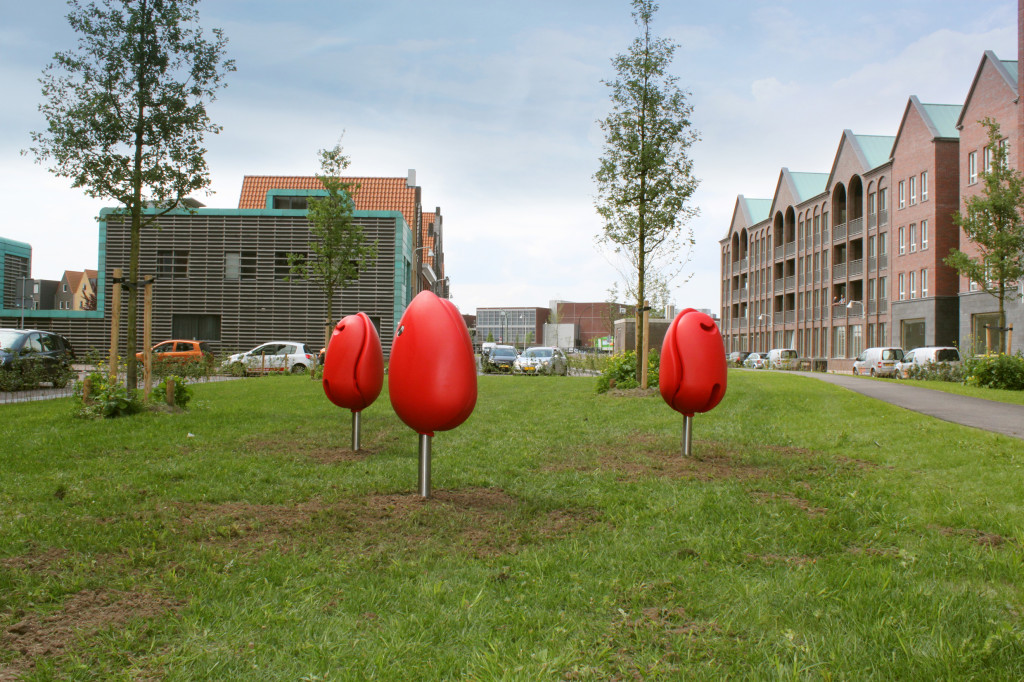
Blokzijl Park

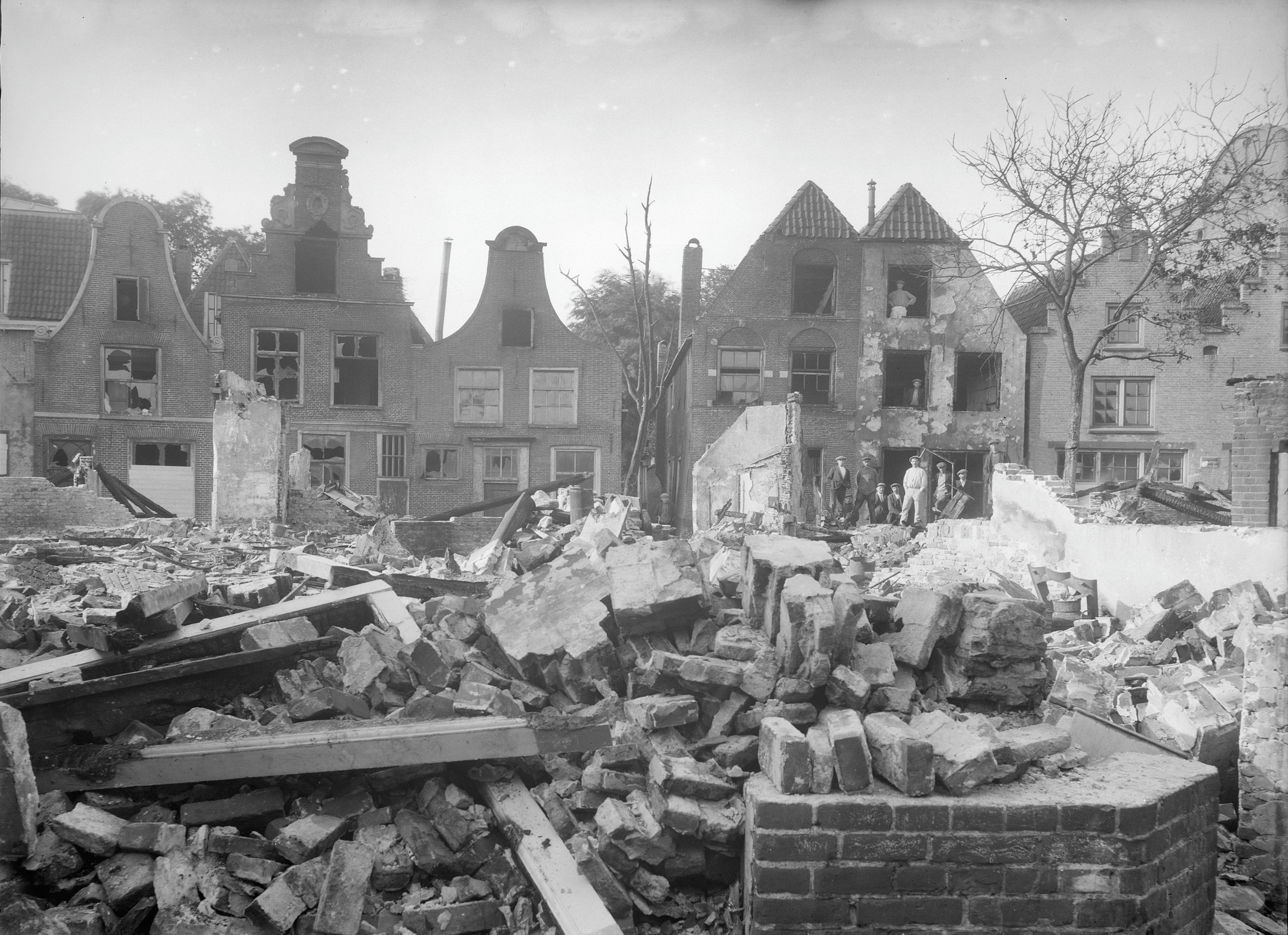
1926 fire
