= Steenwijk =

- City
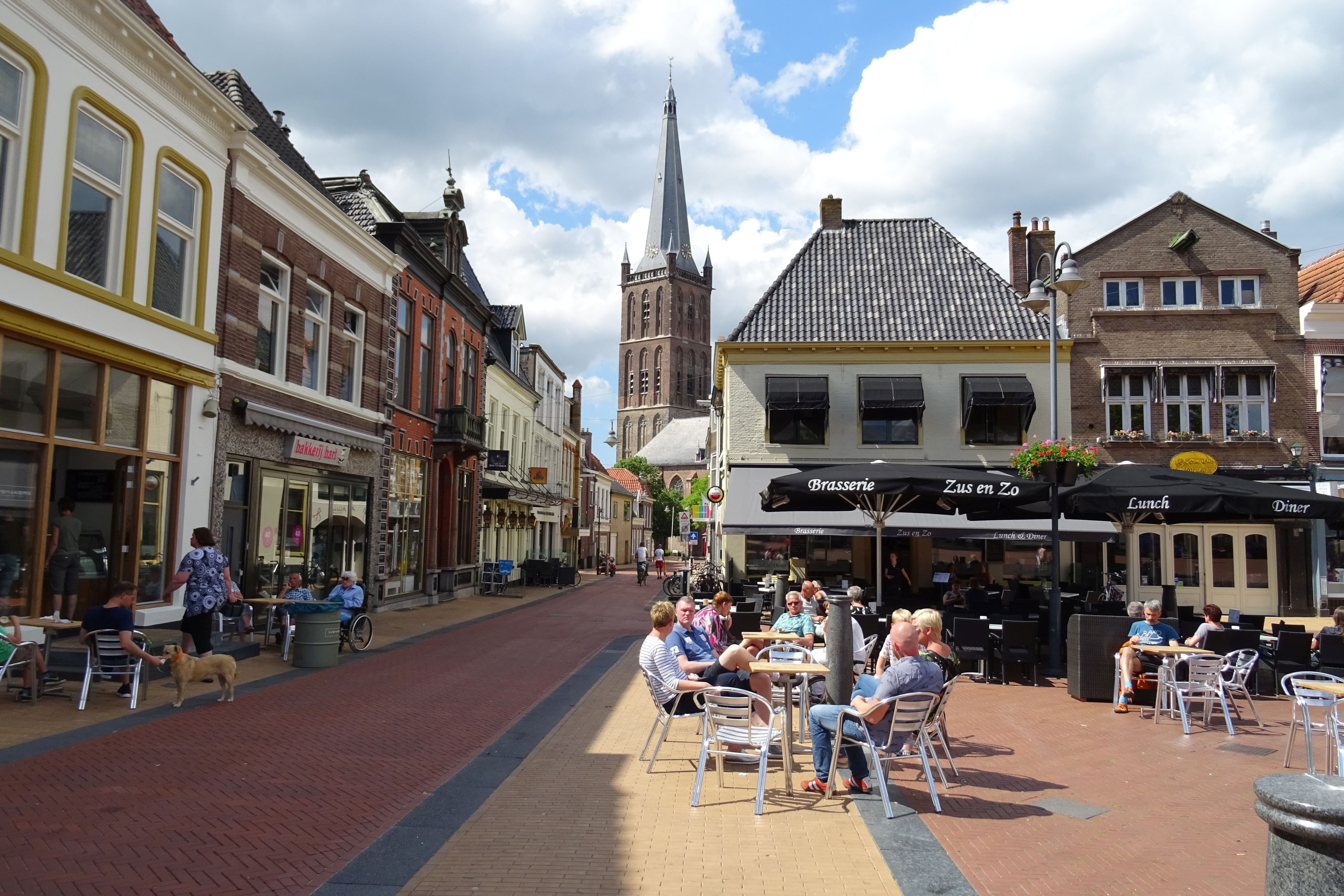
- Market Square

- Flag Coat of arms

- Location in the Netherlands Steenwijk (Netherlands)
- Coordinates: 52°47′20″N 6°7′36″E
- Country: Netherlands
- Province: Overijssel
- Municipality: Steenwijkerland

Area
  - Total: 11.51 km^{2} (4.44 sq mi)
- Elevation: 2 m (6.6 ft)

Population (2021)
  - Total: 17,115
  - Density: 1,487/km^{2} (3,851/sq mi)
- Time zone: UTC+1 (CET)
  - Summer (DST): UTC+2 (CEST)
- Postal code: 8331-8333
- Dialing code: 0521

Steenwijk (Dutch: [ˈsteːɱʋɛik]; Dutch Low Saxon: Steenwiek or Stienwiek) is a city in the Dutch province of Overijssel. It is located in the municipality of Steenwijkerland. It is the largest town of the municipality.

Steenwijk received city rights in 1327. In the Eighty Years' War (1568–1648) it was conquered by the Spaniards in 1581, but regained by the Dutch in 1592.

Steenwijk was a separate municipality until 2001, when it merged with Brederwiede and IJsselham. The new municipality was first named "Steenwijk", but was renamed in 2003 to "Steenwijkerland".

== Transport ==
Steenwijk railway station is located on the Arnhem–Leeuwarden railway, with train services operated by Nederlandse Spoorwegen.

== Gallery ==
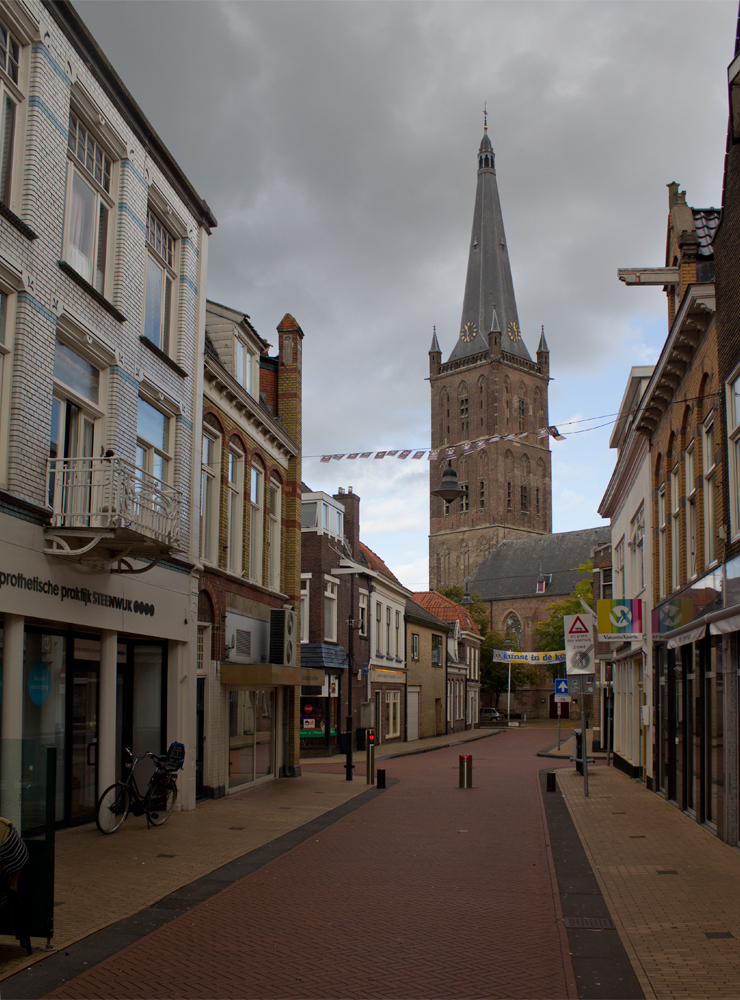
City center and Grote of Sint-Clemenskerk

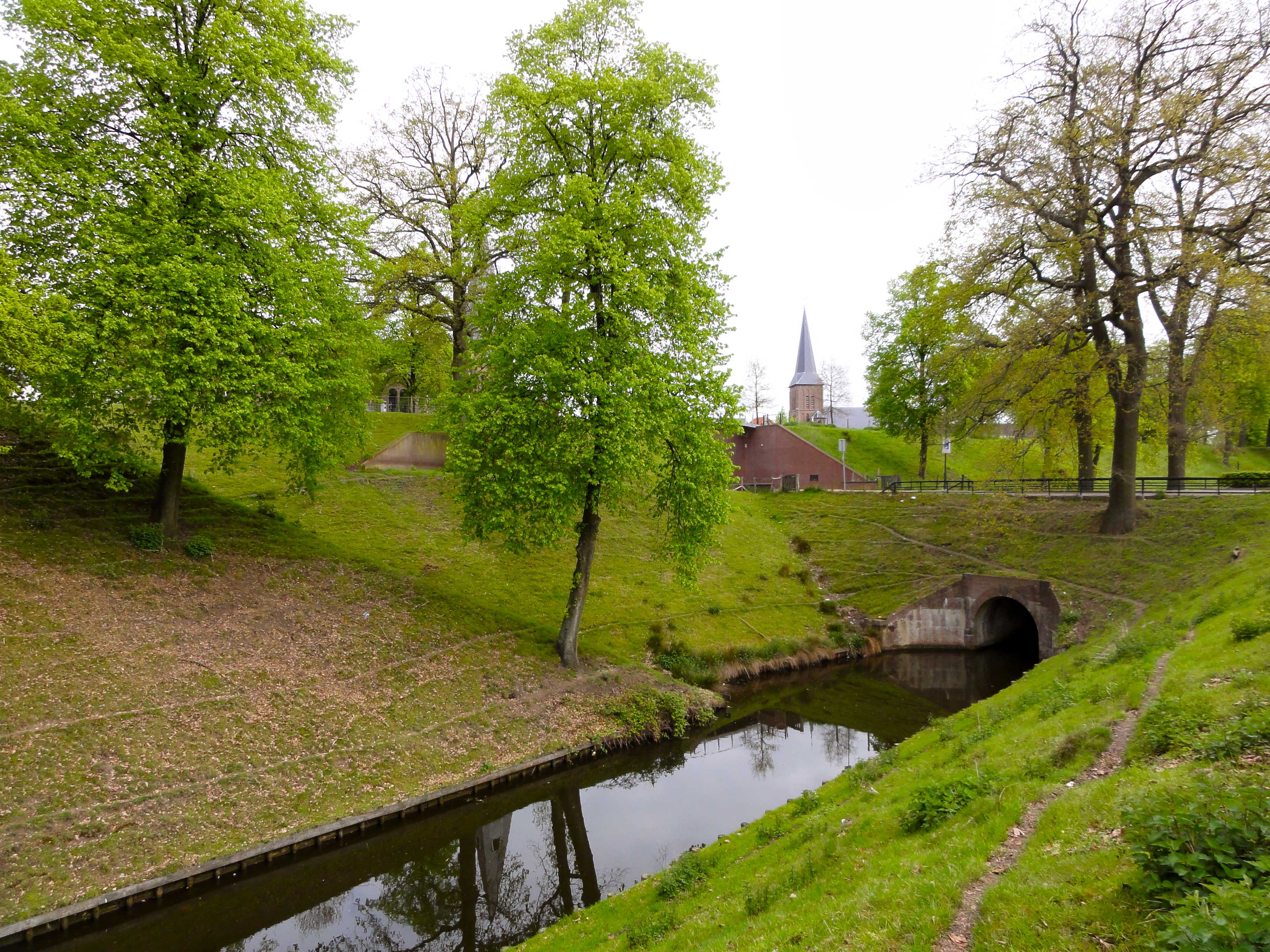
Fortifications with gate around the old city of Steenwijk.

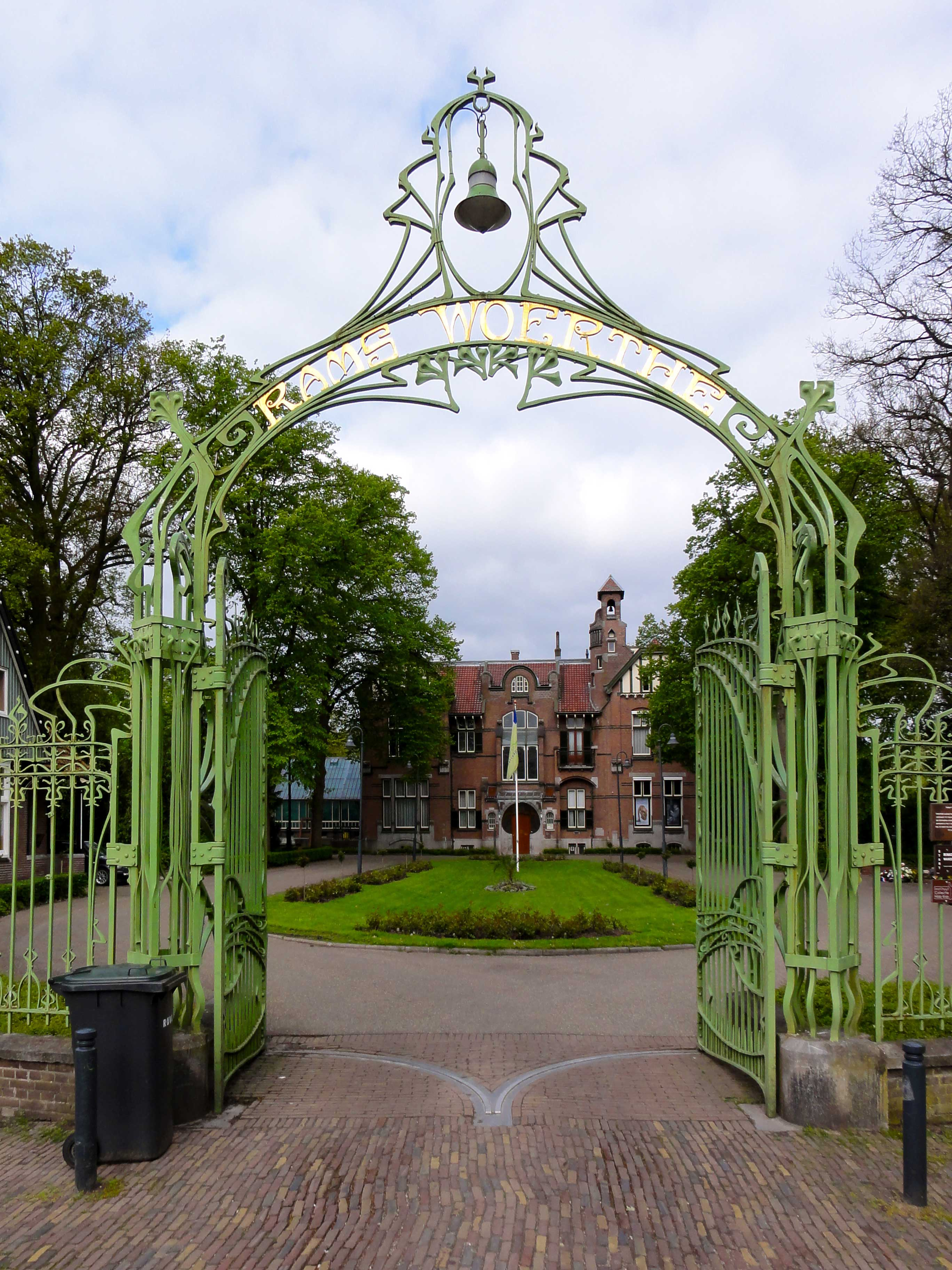
Art Nouveau villa Rams Woerthe.
