= Heemse =

Heemse Hiemse
- Neighbourhood and former village
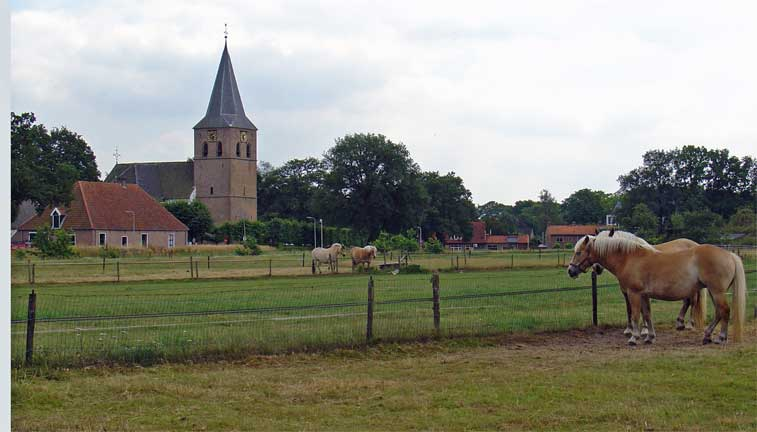
- The church of Heemse

- Location in province of Overijssel in the Netherlands Heemse (Netherlands)
- Coordinates: 52°34′10″N 6°35′24″E
- Country: Netherlands
- Province: Overijssel
- Municipality: Hardenberg

Area
  - Total: 2.63 km^{2} (1.02 sq mi)
- Elevation: 10 m (33 ft)

Population (2021)
  - Total: 2,600
  - Density: 990/km^{2} (2,600/sq mi)
- Time zone: UTC+1 (CET)
  - Summer (DST): UTC+2 (CEST)
- Postal code: 7771
- Dialing code: 0523

Heemse (Dutch Low Saxon: Hiemse) is a neighbourhood of Hardenberg and former village in the Dutch province of Overijssel. In 1966, it was annexed by Hardenberg.

== Overview ==
It was first mentioned in 1240 as Heymiss. The etymology is unknown. Heemse became the seat of the municipality of Ambt Hardenberg. In 1840, it was home to 481 people.

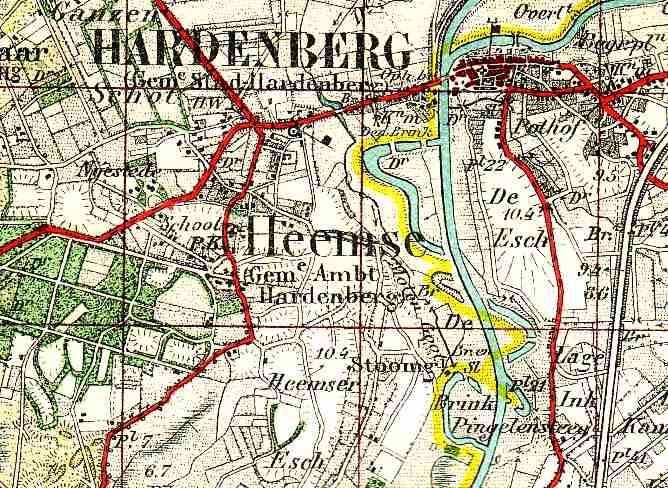

In 1880, plans were being drafted for the building of tramlines from Zwolle to Coevorden and from Avereest to Gramsbergen. The mayor of Hardenberg, Willem van Ittersum, offered subsidies if that last line went to Hardenberg instead of Gramsbergen. In 1886, the first sod was turned by the Dedemsvaartsche Stoomtramweg-Maatschappij (a Dutch steam tramway company). For financial reasons (no bridge needed), the company decided to let the line end in Heemse.

Restaurant De Bokkenpruik (one Michelin star) is located in the village.
