= Gramsbergen =

Gramsbergen Grambarge
- Small city
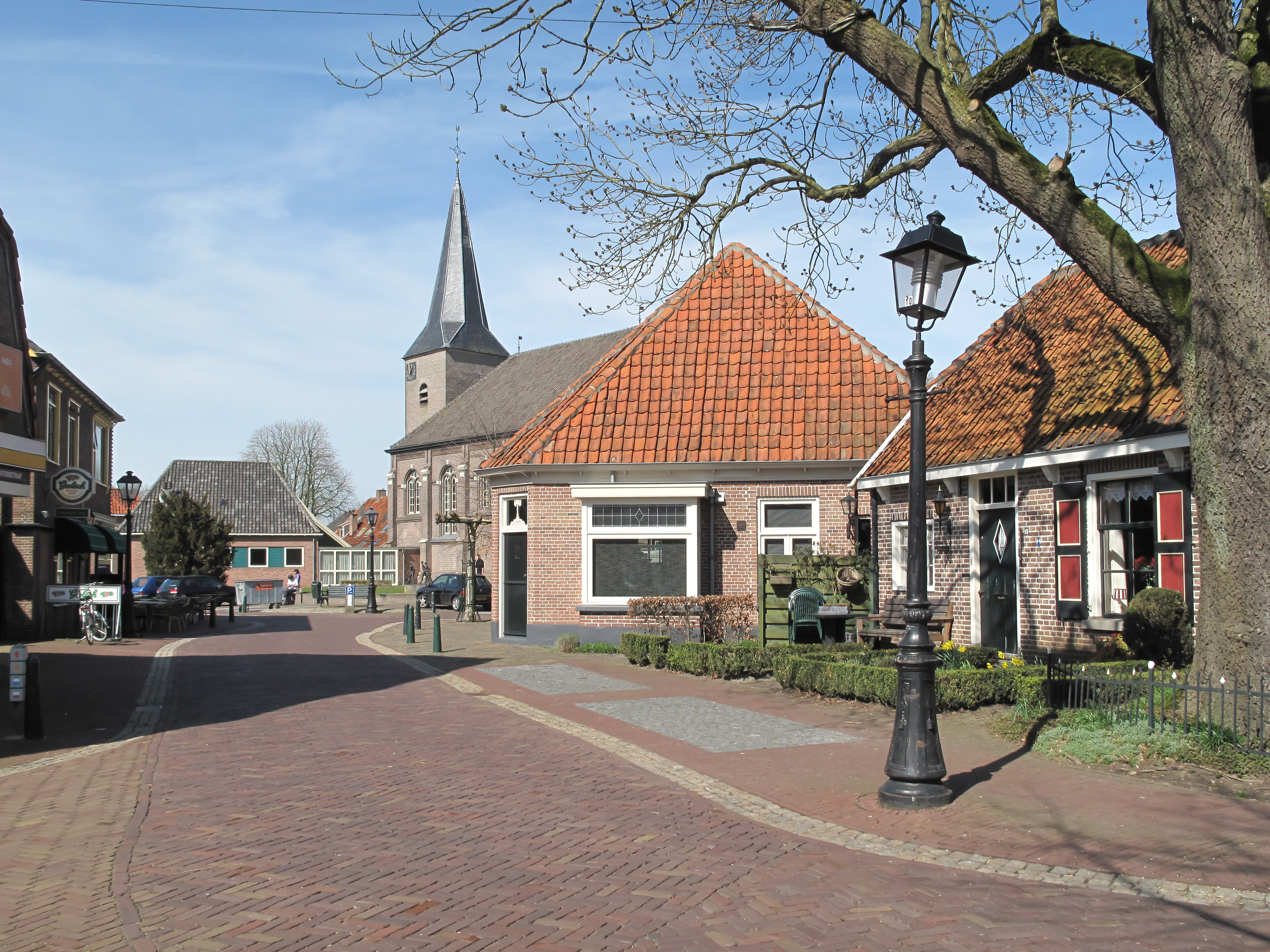
- Gramsbergen, view of the Kerkstraat

- Flag Coat of arms

- Location in province of Overijssel in the Netherlands Gramsbergen (Netherlands)
- Coordinates: 52°36′37″N 6°40′22″E
- Country: Netherlands
- Province: Overijssel
- Municipality: Hardenberg

Area
  - Total: 3.33 km^{2} (1.29 sq mi)
- Elevation: 10 m (33 ft)

Population (2021)
  - Total: 3,180
  - Density: 955/km^{2} (2,470/sq mi)
- Time zone: UTC+1 (CET)
  - Summer (DST): UTC+2 (CEST)
- Postal code: 7783
- Dialing code: 0524
- Website: gramsbergen.nl

Gramsbergen (Dutch Low Saxon: Grambarge) is a small Dutch city on the Vechte, located in the municipality of Hardenberg and the province of Overijssel. The town is located on corridors of different transportation modes: The N34 (Zwolle - Emmen), the Zwolle - Emmen railway and the Almelo - de Haandrik canal.

== History ==
Gramsbergen and its hamlets have been inhabited since pre-historic times. In the 'Cultuur Historisch Informatie Centrum Vechtdal' (The Historical and Cultural Center of Vechtdal), in the centre of Gramsbergen, several archaeological artefacts are exhibited. These artefacts come from settlements from around 8000 BC.

It was first mentioned in 1227 as Bergene, and means "the hill of Gram (person)". It received city rights in 1442.

Gramsbergen developed on higher ground along the Vechte. In 1227, the Battle of Ane was fought to the west of Gramsbergen during which the bishop of Utrecht was defeated by the citizens of Drenthe. In 1339, Huis Gramsbergen, a havezate, was built which developed into a castle. In 1673, it was taken by the Prince-Bishopric of Münster. The castle was destroyed in 1674 by the Dutch States Army to prevent Münster from threatening Coevorden. The city did not develop in its later history and remained relatively small. In 1840, it was home to 526 people.

As an independent municipality, Gramsbergen comprised the centres of Gramsbergen and De Krim and the hamlets Ane, Anerveen, Anevelde, Den Velde, Holtheme Holthone, and Loozen. Since 1 January 2001, Gramsbergen has been part of Hardenberg.

== Transportation ==
Railway Station: Gramsbergen

== Notable citizens ==
- Henk Bodewitz (born 1939), Sanskrit scholar and professor
- Erik Hulzebosch (born 1970), marathon speed skater, inline speed skater and part-time singer and blogger
- Albert Timmer (born 1985), professional road bicycle racer

== Gallery ==
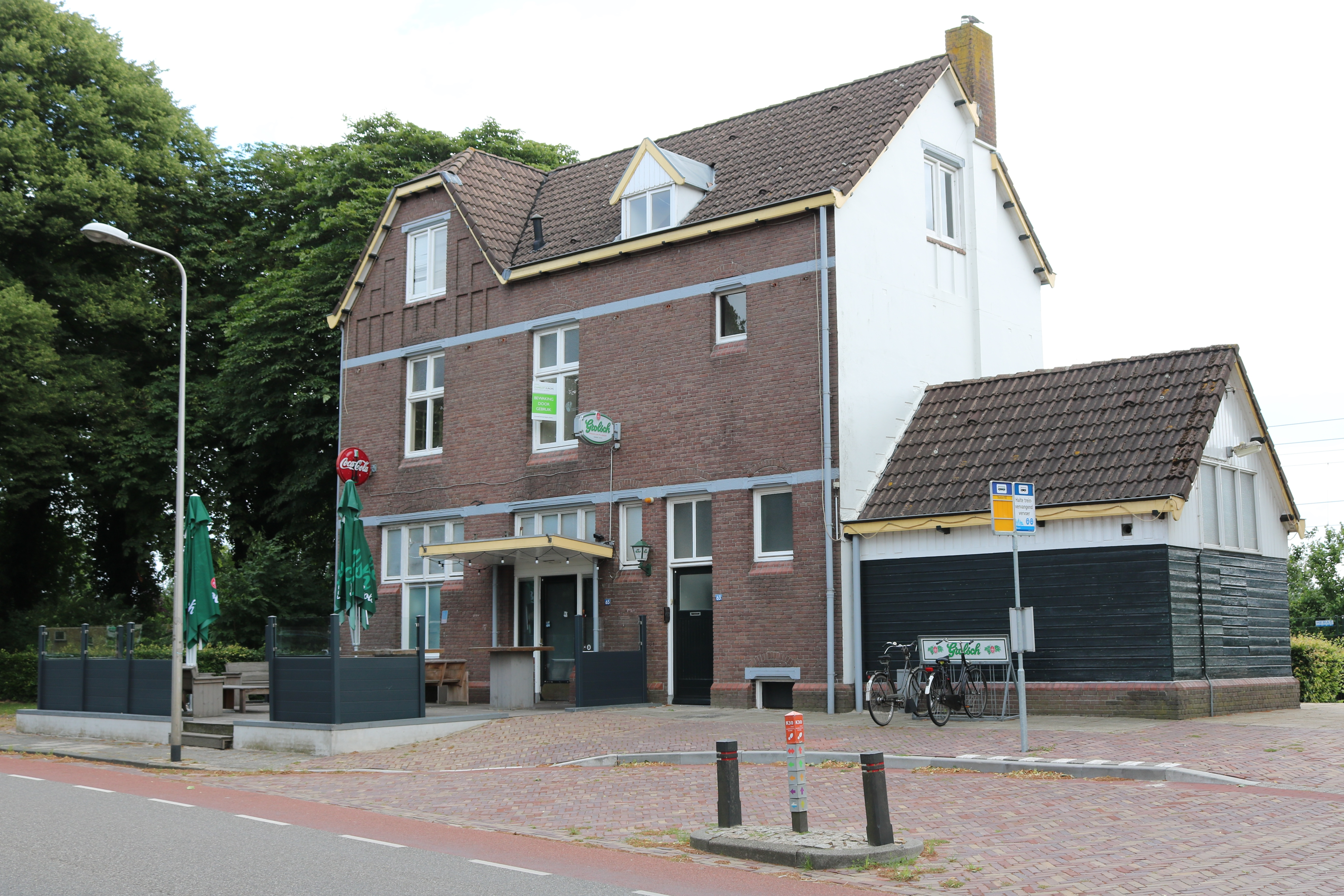
Gramsbergen station

The church of Gramsbergen

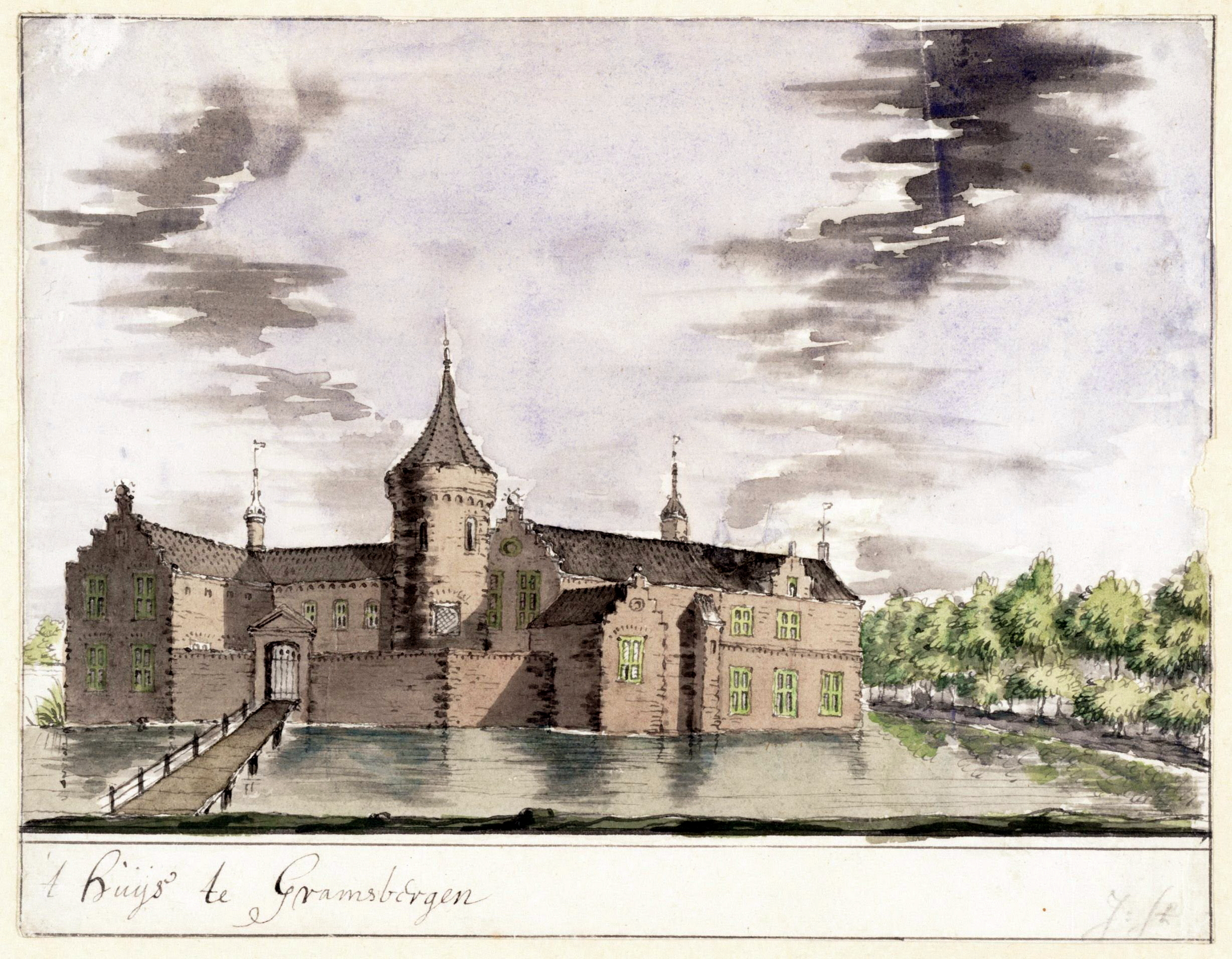
Huis Gramsbergen (c. 1725)

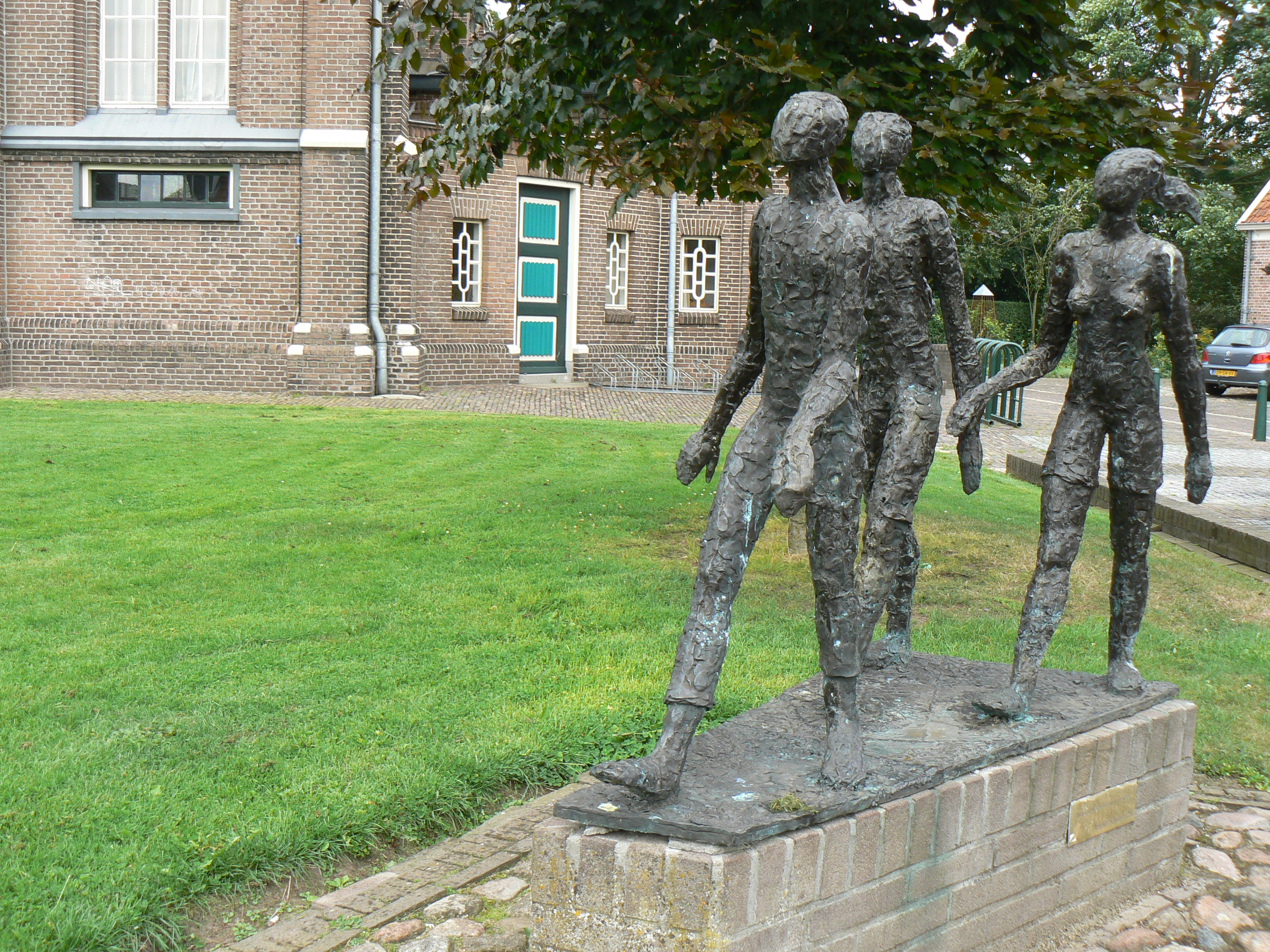
Pieterpad walkers, sculpture by Nelleke Allersma
