= Lutten =

- Village
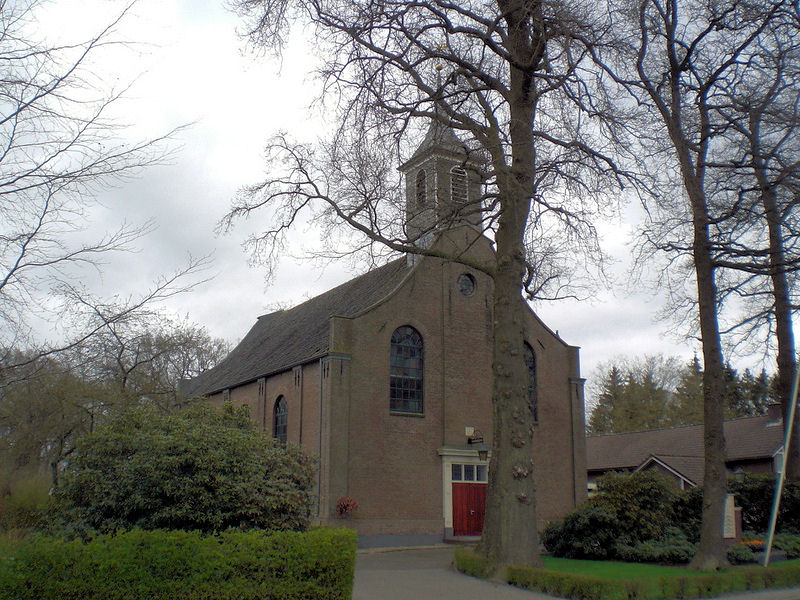
- Dutch Reformed church

- Location in province of Overijssel in the Netherlands Location in the Netherlands
- Coordinates: 52.6116°N 6.5747°E
- Country: Netherlands
- Province: Overijssel
- Municipality: Hardenberg

Area
  - Total: 12.18 km^{2} (4.70 sq mi)
- Elevation: 8 m (26 ft)

Population (2021)
  - Total: 2,045
  - Density: 167.9/km^{2} (434.9/sq mi)
- Time zone: UTC+1 (CET)
  - Summer (DST): UTC+2 (CEST)
- Postal code: 7775
- Dialing code: 0523

Lutten (Dutch Low Saxon: Luttn) is a village in the Dutch province of Overijssel. It is located in the municipality Hardenberg, about 13 kilometres (8.1 mi) south-west of Coevorden.

== History ==
The village was first mentioned in 1532 as Lotten, and means "low lying place". There was another hamlet called Lutten nearby which changed its name to Oud-Lutten (Old Lutten). Lutten developed during the peat excavation of the raised bog. The construction of the Dedemsvaart canal stagnated near Lutten around 1830, because the marke Ane had not divided up the wilderness in its area. A marke was a form of government with communal land. In 1832, the problem was solved by digging a canal to Slagharen.

Lutten was home to 236 people in 1840. The Dutch Reformed church in the village is an aisleless church with an entrance hall topped by a tower with wooden roof lantern. It was built in 1853.

In 1901, the potato starch factory, Baanbreker opened in Lutten. The complex is now used by a plastic pipe factory.

In 1932, a water tower was built which measures 49 metres (161 ft). It is one of two Dutch water towers with a gable roof. The tower is currently used as bed and breakfast.

== Notable people ==
- Gert Heerkes (born 1965), football manager
- Niek Kimmann (born 1996), BMX Racing cyclist and Olympic Champion

== Gallery ==
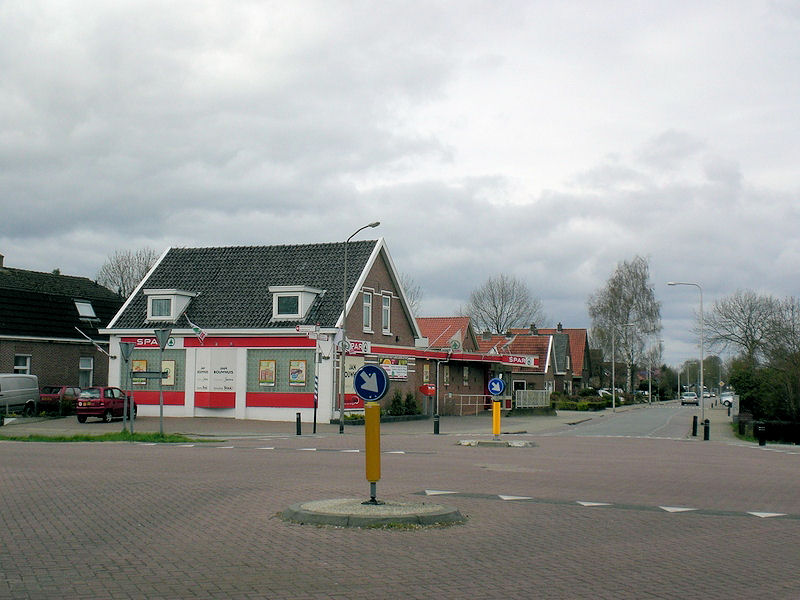
Centre of Lutten

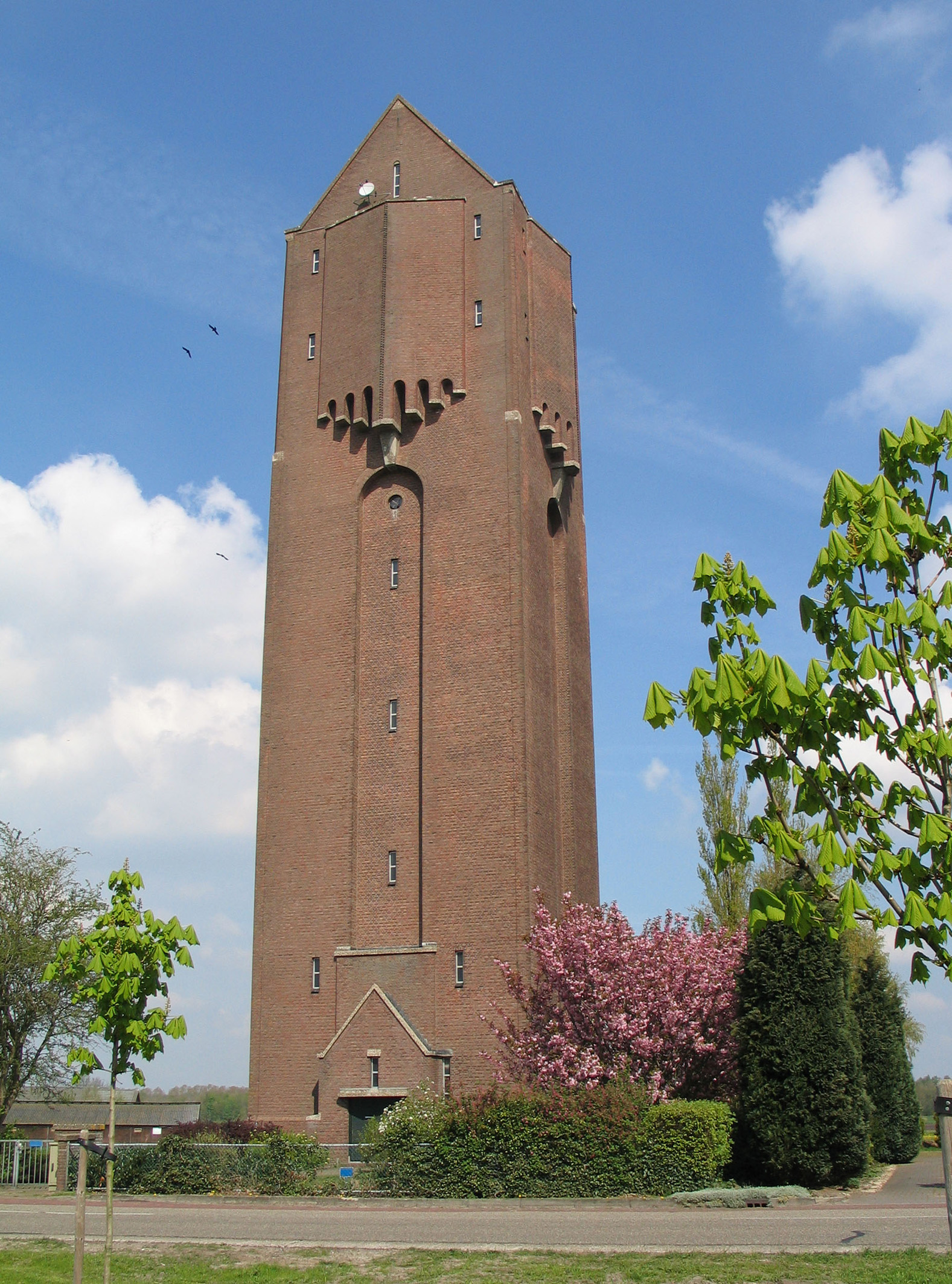
Water tower

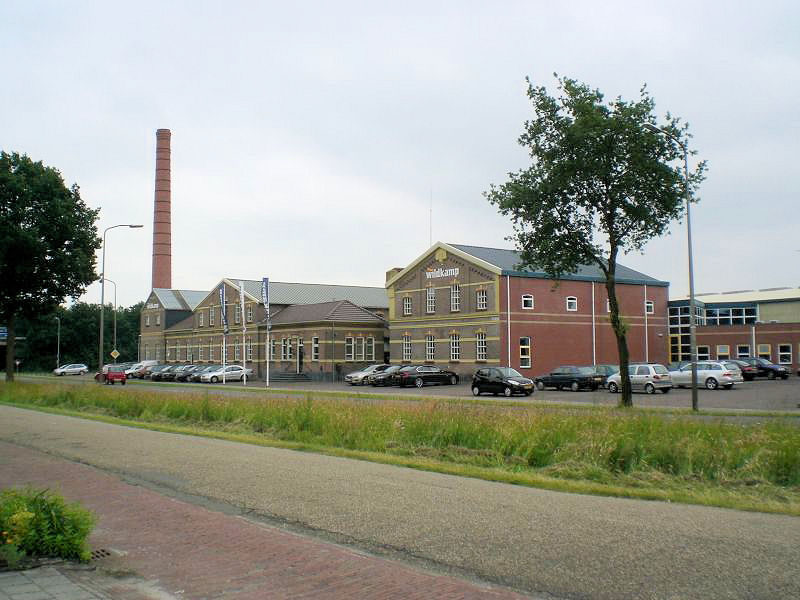
Former potato starch factory Baanbreker.

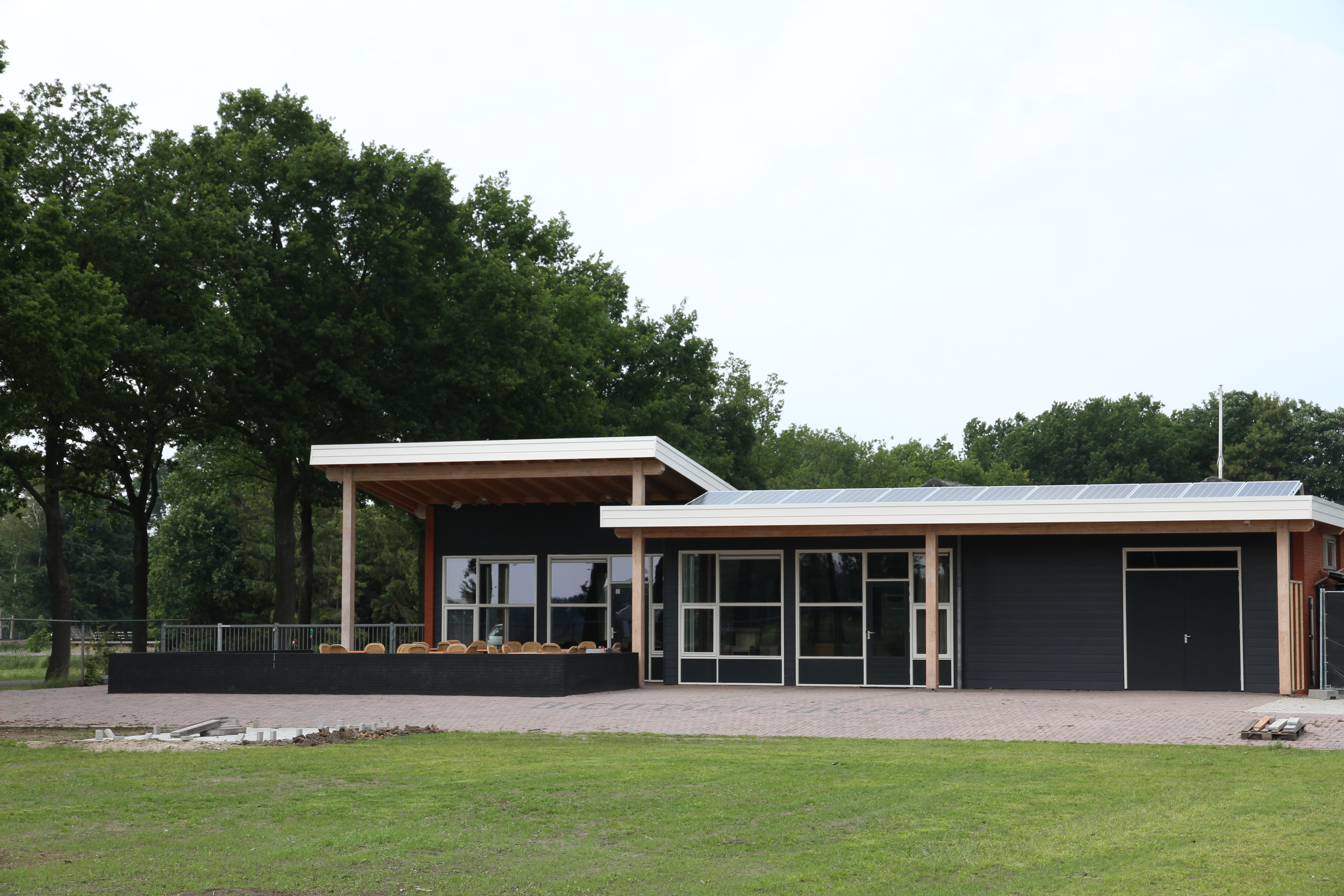
Village house
