= Idylle =

Idylle could refer to:

- Idyll, poetic genre
- Idylle (Edgar), 1884 violin and piano piece by Edward Elgar
- Idylle (restaurant), former fine dining restaurant in Zweeloo, the Netherlands
- Cyclone Idylle (1979), hitting Western Australia
