= Erik Hulzebosch =

Dutch speed skater

Personal information
- Born: 17 June 1970 (age 56) Ane, Netherlands

Sport
- Country: Netherlands
- Sport: Speed skating
Medal record
Men's speed skating
Representing the Netherlands
Dutch Marathon Championships
| Gold medal – first place | 1993 Maasland | Natural Ice |

Erik Hulzebosch (born 17 June 1970) is a Dutch marathon speed skater, inline speed skater and part-time singer and blogger at his own website.

== Biography ==
Born in Ane, Gramsbergen Hulzebosch started as a cyclo-cross cyclist. In marathon speed skating, he won several races on both artificial and natural track races, making his debut in 1987. He was the 1992 World Champion in inline skating. During the 1997 Elfstedentocht Hulzebosch was favourite to win the title, but was outsprinted in the final metres by Henk Angenent. Hulzebosch is known for his Eastern Dutch accent, and his popularity at that time resulted in a 1997 top-15 hit called "Hulzebosch Hulzebosch". He is married to long track speed skater Jenita Hulzebosch-Smit, sister of Olympic silver medalist Gretha Smit.

== Honours ==
=== Speed skating ===
This list is incomplete

- 1991 – 1st in Open Dutch natural track marathon championships (100 km)
- 1993 – 1st in Dutch natural track marathon championships (100 km)
- 1995 – 1st in the Amstelmeermarathon (100 km)
- 1995 – 1st in Veluwemeertocht in Elburg (100 km)
- 1995 – 2nd in Holland Venetië in Giethoorn race (100 km)
- 1996 – 1st in Holland Venetië in Giethoorn race (50 km)
- 1997 – 2nd in the 15th Elfstedentocht (200 km)
- 2007 – 1st in the Borlänge Marathon (150 km)

=== Inline speed skating ===
This list is incomplete

- 1986 – 1st in Dutch national championships, B-riders
- 1988 – 1st in Heineken Inline Skating Race (200 km)
- 1988 – 3rd in Dutch national championships
- 1988 – named as Sportsman of the year in Gramsbergen
- 1989 – 1st in Heineken Inline Skating Race (200 km)
- 1989 – 1st in Wehkamp Trophy
- 1989 – named as Sportsman of the year in Gramsbergen
- 1990 – 1st in Wehkamp Trophy
- 1991 – 1st in Wehkamp Trophy
- 1992 – 1st in World Championships marathon (42,195 m)
- 1992 - 2nd in World Championships 20,000 meter elimination race

== Discography ==
- 1997 – Hulzebosch Hulzebosch, highest position: 15th, number of weeks: 5
- 1998 – Foie foie foie / Ik vin oe sexie, highest position: tip, number of weeks: 0
