= 't Haantje, Overijssel =

't Haantje
- Hamlet
- Location in province of Overijssel in the Netherlands 't Haantje (Netherlands)
- Coordinates: 52.6100°N 6.5990°E
- Country: Netherlands
- Province: Overijssel
- Municipality: Hardenberg
- Elevation: 8 m (26 ft)
- Time zone: UTC+1 (CET)
  - Summer (DST): UTC+2 (CEST)
- Postal code: 7775
- Dialing code: 0523

't Haantje (Dutch Low Saxon: 't (H)aantien) is a hamlet in the Dutch province of Overijssel. It is located in the municipality of Hardenberg, about 5 km north of the town of Hardenberg.

't Haantje is not a statistical entity, and the postal authorities have placed it under Lutten. It has about 25 houses.
