= List of mayors of Bedum =

This is a list of mayors of Bedum. Bedum is a town in the north of the Netherlands.

Years	Name	Party or ideology	Comments	Image
1808–1812	Jan Wieringa			
1812–1825	Jan Rijkens			
1825–1835	Berend Peppink		Fired and found guilty of theft and embezzlement.	
1835–1858	Mr. Carel van Naerssen		During 1837–1857 also Mayor of Adorp	
1858–1860	Mr. Antonius van Roijen			
1860–1873	Jan Leopold		Previously Mayor of Adorp, died 29 September 1873	
1873–1878	Wijtze Bekker		Previously Mayor of Winsum, next Mayor of Hennaarderadeel	
1878–1895	Reinder van Bruggen			
1895–1909	Dr. Hieronijmus Schleurholts			
1909–1914	Simon Berman		Previously Mayor of Schagen, next Mayor of Alblasserdam	
1914–1917	Klaas van Sevenhoven	ARP	Previously Mayor of Stedum, next Mayor of Onstwedde	
1917–1944	Minne Jouwstra	ARP	Previously Municipal Director of Ambt Hardenberg	
1944–1945	Ido Timmer	NSB	Enriched himself with Jewish property, arrested and threatened residents. Died in 1962.	
1945–1947	Minne Jouwstra	ARP		
1947–1962	Jan Spoelstra	ARP	Previously Mayor of Leens	
1962–1971	Jos Lindeboom	ARP	Previously Mayor of Leens	
1971–1991	Albert Smallenbroek	ARP/CDA	Previously Mayor of Oldekerk	
1991–2009	Wilte Everts	CDA	Previously Deputy Mayor of Winsum	
2010–2017	Henk Bakker	CDA	Previously Municipal Director of Groningen, started as Caretaking Mayor	
2017–2018	Erica van Lente	PvdA	Caretaking Mayor, next Mayor of Dalfsen	
