= Stad Hardenberg =

Former municipality in the Netherlands

Coordinates: 52°34′32″N 6°37′08″E

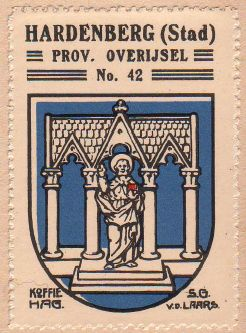
Coat of arms of Stad Hardenberg

Stad Hardenberg is a former municipality in the Dutch province of Overijssel. It consisted of the city of Hardenberg.

It existed from 1818 to 1941, when it merged with the municipality of Ambt Hardenberg, which covered the surrounding countryside.
