= Albert Hardenberg =

Protestant reformer

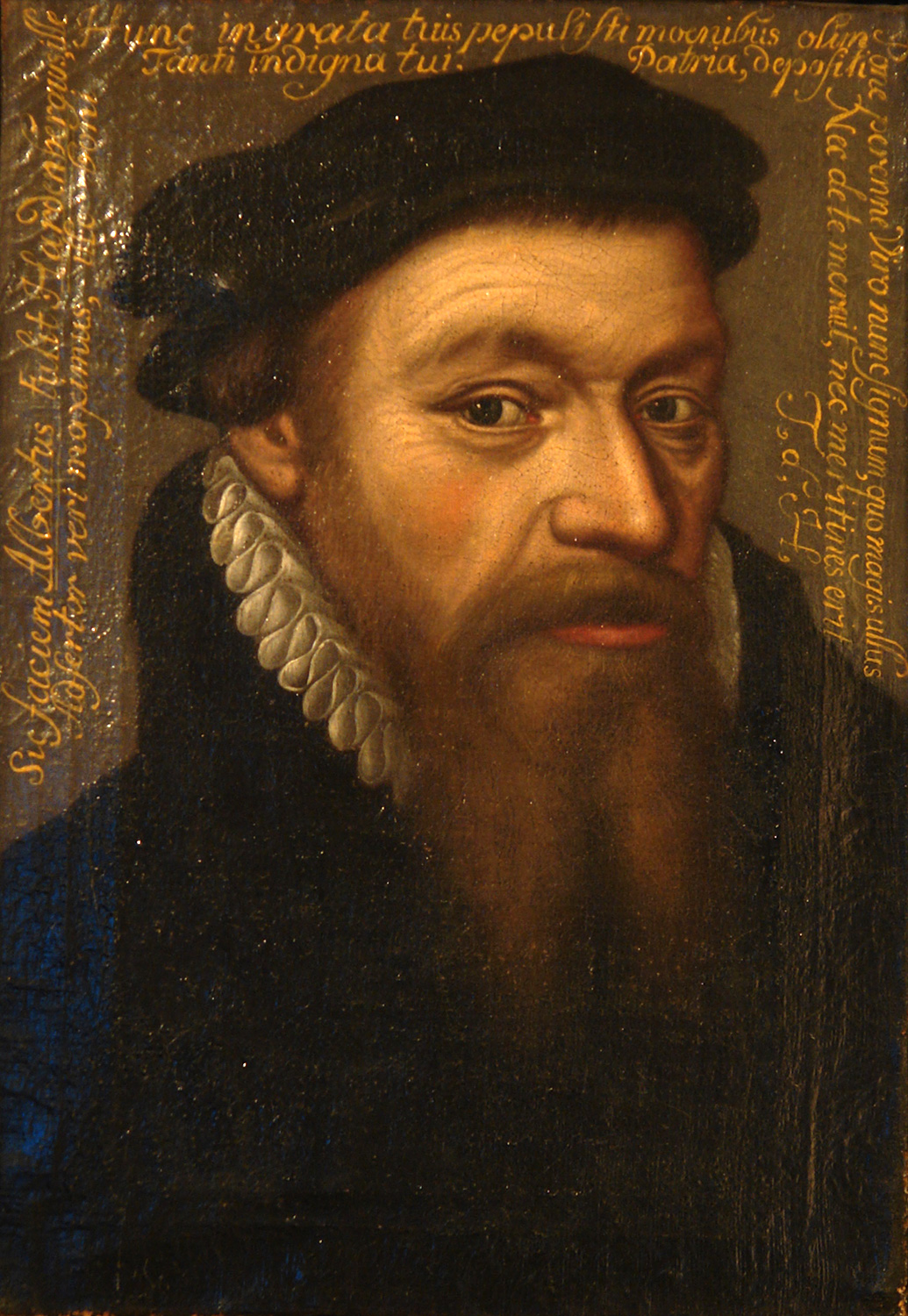
Albertus Risaeus (Albrecht Hardenberg)

Albert Hardenberg or Albertus Risaeus (c. 1510 in Rheeze near Hardenberg – 18 May 1574 in Emden) was a Reformed theologian and Protestant reformer, who was also active as a reformer in Cologne, Bremen and Emden.

== Life ==
From the age of seven, he was put in the school of the "Fratres vitae communis" in Groninghe. He decided at the age of 17 to become a priest and became a monk in the abbey of Aduard. In 1540, he was sent by his community as a student at the University of Louvain to take theology courses so that he could one day be able to become abbot of a monastery. There he obtained his degree of license, but he was quickly drawn into the movement of active reformers in the University of Louvain.

== Bibliography ==
- Realenzyklopädie für protestantische Theologie und Kirche, Vol 7, p 404
- Spiegel: Albert Rizäus Hardenberg, (Bremer Jahrbuch 4) Bremen, 1869.
- Jürgen Moltmann: Christoph Pezel und der Calvinismus in Bremen, Bremen 1958, 16ff.
- H. Engelhardt: Der Irrlehreprozeß gegen Albert Hardenberg 1547—1561, (Diss.) Frankfurt, 1961.
- H. Engelhardt: Das Irrlehreverfahren des Niedersächsischen Reichs-Kreises gegen A. H. 1560/61, (JGNKG 61, 1963, 32ff.)
- H. Engelhardt: Der Irrlehrestreit zwischen Albert Hardenberg und dem Bremer Rat 1547—1561, (Hospitium Ecclesiae 4, 1964, 32ff.)
- W. Neuser: Hardenberg u. Melanchthon. Der Hardenbergische Streit 1554—60, (JGNKG 65, 1967, 142ff.)
- Rottländer: Der Bürgermeister von Büren und die Hardenbergschen Religionshändel in Bremen, Göttingen, 1982
- Wim Janse, Albert Hardenberg als Theologe. Profil eines Bucer-Schülers, Leiden, New York u. Köln 1994
- Wim Janse, Albert Rizäus Hardenberg und sein Wirken als Domprediger, 1547-1561, In: Hospitum Ecclaesiae. Forschungen zur bremischen Kirchengeschichte 22, 2003, pp. 43-53
- Heinz Scheible: Melanchthons Briefwechsel Personen 12 Stuttgart-Bad Cannstatt, 2005 ISBN 3-7728-2258-4
- Herbert Schwarzwälder: Das Große Bremen-Lexikon, Edition Temmen, Bremen, 2003, ISBN 3-86108-693-X
- Werner Kloos: Bremer Lexikon, Hauschild Verlag, Bremen, 1980, ISBN 3-920699-31-9
- Friedrich Wilhelm Bautz (1990). "Hardenberg, Albert". In Bautz, Friedrich Wilhelm (ed.). Biographisch-Bibliographisches Kirchenlexikon (BBKL) (in German). Vol. 2. Hamm: Bautz. cols. 523–526. ISBN 3-88309-032-8.
- Jürgen Moltmann (1966). "Hardenberg, Albert". Neue Deutsche Biographie (in German). Vol. 7. Berlin: Duncker & Humblot. pp. 663–663.
