= De Bokkepruik =

Coordinates: 52°34′26.18″N 6°36′23.67″E

- Interactive map of De Bokkepruik

Restaurant information
- Established: 1985 in Zweeloo
- Head chef: Jaap Istha
- Food type: French
- Rating: Michelin Guide
- Location: Hessenweg 7, Hardenberg, 7771 CH, Netherlands
- Seating capacity: 50
- Website: Official website

The De Bokkepruik is a restaurant located in Heemse, Netherlands. It is a fine dining restaurant that was awarded one Michelin star from 1990 to present.

Gault Millau awarded the restaurant 15 out of 20 points.

Head chef of De Bokkepruik is Jaap Istha. Maître and sommelier is Heleen Istha-Koeslag.

De Bokkepruik is a former member of Alliance Gastronomique Néerlandaise.

== History ==
The Michelin Guides 1979 and 1985 refer to a restaurant Koeslag on the same location. The Michelin Guide 1993 mentions hotel Herberg De Rustenberg and restaurant De Bokkepruik on the Hessenweg. In 2001, the hotel has disappeared and De Bokkepruik is mentioned as restaurant with accommodation.

The restaurant was originally located in Zweeloo, in an old Saxonian farmhouse. In 1992, Heleen and Jaap Istha moved the restaurant to Heemse. There it became part of hotel Herberg De Rustenberg, formerly owned by the parents of Heleen. Already from 1791, the Koeslag family ran a farm with livery stables and inn at this address.

== See also ==
- List of Michelin starred restaurants in the Netherlands
