= Gert Heerkes =

Dutch football manager

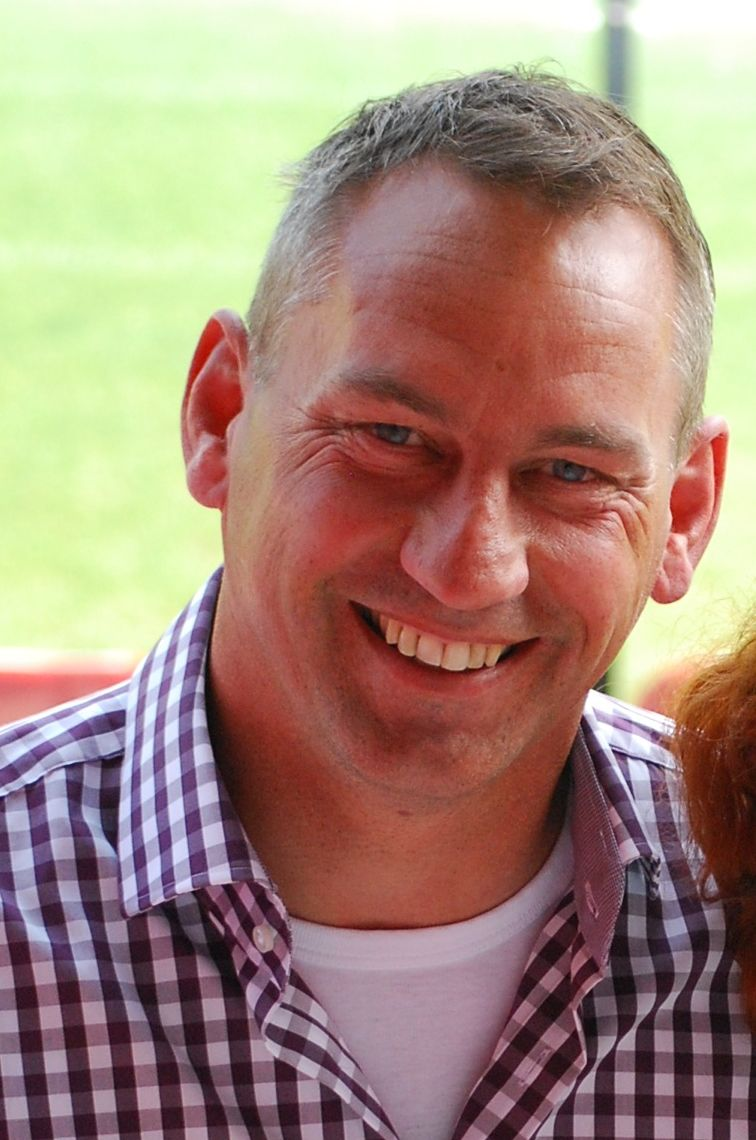

Personal information
- Full name: Gert Heerkes
- Date of birth: 3 November 1965 (age 61)
- Place of birth: Lutten, Netherlands

Managerial career
- Years: Team
- 1998–2002: PH Almelo
- 2002–2004: SV Gramsbergen
- 2004–2006: KVV Quick 1920
- 2006–2008: CVV Germanicus
- 2008–2009: Heracles Almelo
- 2010–2011: Willem II
- 2011–2013: SC Veendam
- 2013–2014: Jiangsu Sainty (Assistant)
- 2016: FC Emmen
- 2017–2019: Rosenborg 2 (Assistant)

Gert Heerkes (Dutch pronunciation: [ɣɛrt ˈɦeːrkəs]; born 3 November 1965) is a Dutch football manager who is the assistant manager of Norwegian side Rosenborg's reserve team.

He has been in charge of professional teams Willem II, Heracles Almelo and SC Veendam, and also served as assistant coach at SC Heerenveen during the 2009–10 season.
