= Idylle (restaurant) =

Defunct restaurant in the Netherlands

Coordinates: 52°47′32.88″N 6°43′48.42″E

- Interactive map of Idylle

Restaurant information
- Established: 3 March 1993
- Closed: 1 September 2007
- Head chef: Joop Zwiep
- Food type: French
- Rating: Michelin Guide
- Location: Kruisstraat 21, Zweeloo, 7851 AE, Netherlands

Idylle is a defunct restaurant in Zweeloo, Netherlands. It was a fine dining restaurant that was awarded one Michelin star in 1997 and retained that rating until 2007.

Owner and head chef of Idylle was Joop Zwiep.

The restaurant regularly organized culinary test-events under the name "Proef op de Tong" (Eng.: "Test on the Tongue") in which chef Zwiep often mocked with standard culinary practices. In 2001, he changed the flow of courses and started with a dessert. In 1997, he confused his guests by serving a blue asparagus soup.

The restaurant lost its star in 2008, due to Zwiep changing course from a fine dining restaurant to a cooking workshop in 2007.

Idylle was a former member of the Alliance Gastronomique Néerlandaise.

The restaurant was housed in a Dutch national monument, a Saxon farmhouse, built in the 19th century. Earlier it housed Michelin starred restaurant De Bokkenpruik.

== See also ==
- List of Michelin starred restaurants in the Netherlands
