= Aaltje Kraak =

Dutch woman

- Born: Aaltje Cramer; 17th century Dutch Republic
- Died: 18th century Dutch Republic
- Other names: Aaltje Otten
- Known for: Causing the 1708 city fire in Hardenberg

Aaltje Cramer-Kraak (born: mid-17th century - died: 18 century), also known as Aaltje Otten, was a Dutch woman from Hardenberg. She accidentally caused the major 1708 Hardenberg city fire where much of the city burned down.

Over 300 years later she is still being commemorated with among others an annual “Aaltje Kraak Day” and a bronze statue in the city.

== Personal life ==
Kraak was born as Aaltje Cramer around the mid-17th century. She had the name Aaltje Cramer-Kraak after her marriage to Berend Cramer. They had at least one son who was a skipper's boy. After the death of her husband she lived as of 1708 as an old widow in Hardenberg. After the 1708 city fire she continued to live in Hardenberg.

== 1708 Hardenberg city fire ==
On the evening of 8 May 1708 she accidentally caused the 1908 Hardenberg city fire. There are two stories about what happened. One is said that she held a burning oil lamp too close to the reed roof. The other story is she went to mend her son's "hoozen" (pants) and for this she needed some scraps of cloth that were in the closet-bed. She illuminated her search with a candle or candlestick, which caused the bed to catch fire. Despite desperate attempts to extinguish the fire, the house quickly burned down.

The city of 105 houses completely burned down within two hours, except for around three houses, the church and school. There were no casualties, primarily because people were able to escape the city quickly.

After a fundraising campaign and through the determination and solidarity of the citizens, everyone received a new house. Kraak was not cast out, but thanks to the fundraising and various donations, she was given her own place in Hardenberg.

== Commemoration of Kraak ==
In 2008, 300 years after the fire, “Aaltje Kraak Day” has been established as an annual commemoration day in Hardenberg on 8 May.

For the 650th anniversary of Hardenberg, a bronze statue of Aaltje Kraak was unveiled, made by artist Geke Dijkhuis. It is located on the Wilhelmina square, near the Stephanuskerk (Stephanus Church). The same year Bart Kuijer wrote a song titled "Aaltje Kraak".
