= Anevelde =

- Hamlet
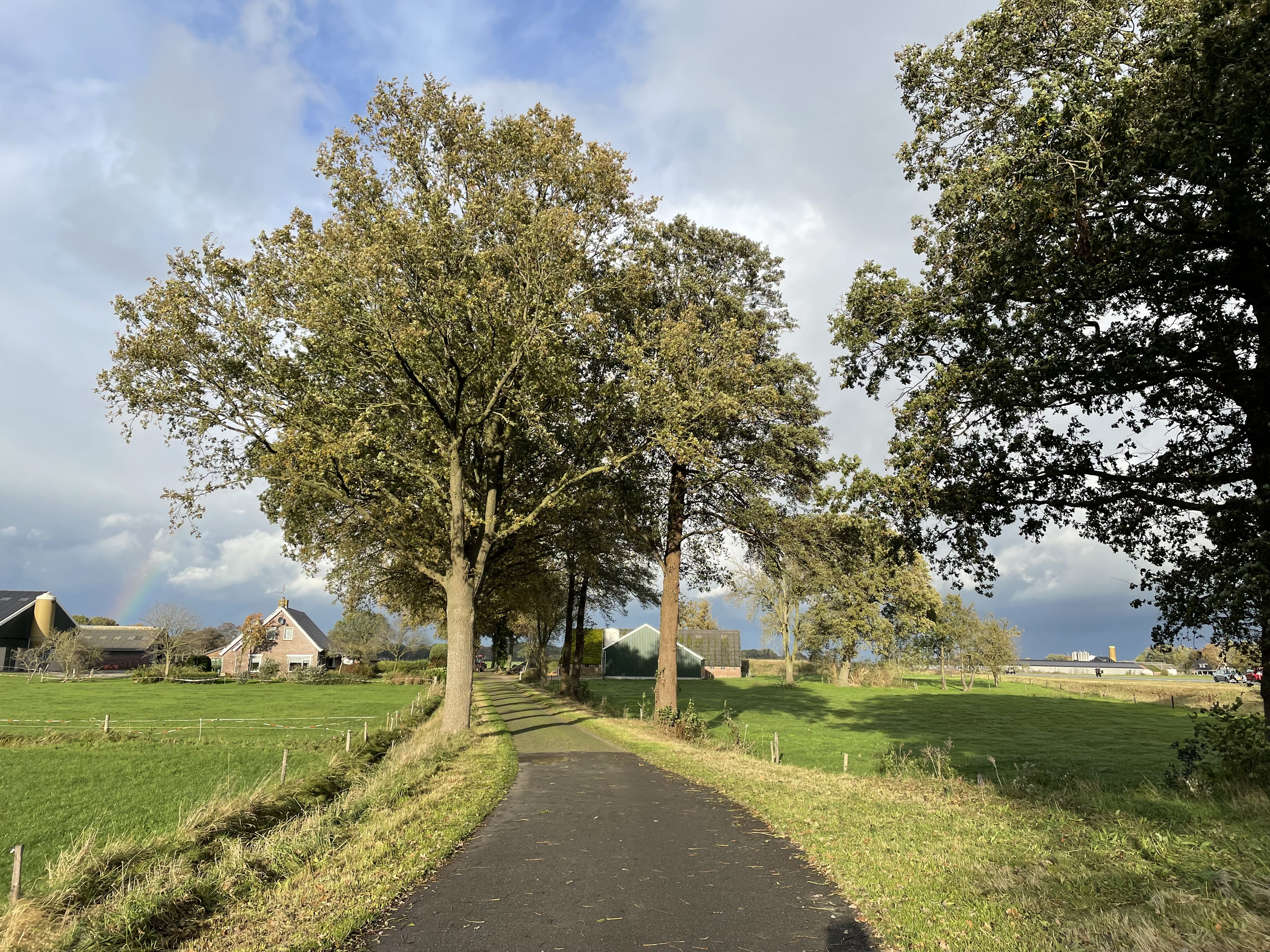
- The Pothofweg in Anevelde

- Location in province of Overijssel in the Netherlands Anevelde (Netherlands)
- Coordinates: 52°35′51″N 6°38′58″E
- Country: Netherlands
- Province: Overijssel
- Municipality: Hardenberg

Area
  - Total: 2.39 km^{2} (0.92 sq mi)
- Elevation: 9 m (30 ft)

Population (2021)
  - Total: 40
  - Density: 17/km^{2} (43/sq mi)
- Time zone: UTC+1 (CET)
  - Summer (DST): UTC+2 (CEST)
- Postal code: 7785
- Dialing code: 0524

Anevelde is a hamlet in the Dutch province of Overijssel. It is located in the municipality Hardenberg, about 3 km northeast of the centre of Hardenberg.

It was first mentioned in 1259 as Anewede, and means "field near Ane. In 1840, it was home to 62 people. In 2017, the N34 which runs through the hamlet was doubled and all at-grade intersections were removed. The villagers have protested and demanded a tunnel, otherwise they would have to make a 10 kilometres (6.2 mi) detour. A tunnel under the N34 was then built.
