= Anerveen =

- Hamlet
- Location in province of Overijssel in the Netherlands Anerveen (Netherlands)
- Coordinates: 52°38′0″N 6°39′43″E
- Country: Netherlands
- Province: Overijssel
- Municipality: Hardenberg

Area
  - Total: 5.33 km^{2} (2.06 sq mi)
- Elevation: 9 m (30 ft)

Population (2021)
  - Total: 155
  - Density: 29.1/km^{2} (75.3/sq mi)
- Time zone: UTC+1 (CET)
  - Summer (DST): UTC+2 (CEST)
- Postal code: 7788
- Dialing code: 0524

Anerveen is a hamlet in the Dutch province of Overijssel. It is located in the municipality Hardenberg, about 7 km north of the centre of Hardenberg.

It was first mentioned in 1846 as Anerveen, and means "bog near Ane". In 1840, it was home to 222 people.
