= Joke Bouwstra =

Dutch university professor

Johanna Aaltje "Joke" Bouwstra (born 2 December 1956) is a Dutch researcher and professor of drug administration at Leiden University. Bouwstra has worked at the Leiden Academic Centre for Drug Research, where she has been section leader of Drug Delivery Technology.

== Career ==
Bouwstra was born on 2 December 1956 in Hardenberg. She obtained her PhD at Utrecht University in 1985, with a thesis titled: "Thermodynamic and structural investigations of binary systems". Since 1985 Bouwstra has been involved with the predecessor institutes of the Leiden Academic Centre for Drug Research. In 2004 she became a professor of Drug administration at Leiden University. As of 2013, Bouwstra has worked at the Leiden Academic Centre for Drug Research, where she has been section leader of Drug Delivery Technology.

In 2005 Technologiestichting STW named Bouwstra the Simon Stevin Master 2005. In 2011 she won the CHANEL-CERIES Research Award. Bouwstra was elected a member of the Royal Netherlands Academy of Arts and Sciences in 2013.

Bouwstra's research has focused on the administration of drugs through the human skin and the barrier role the skin has.
