= Bruchterveld =

- Village
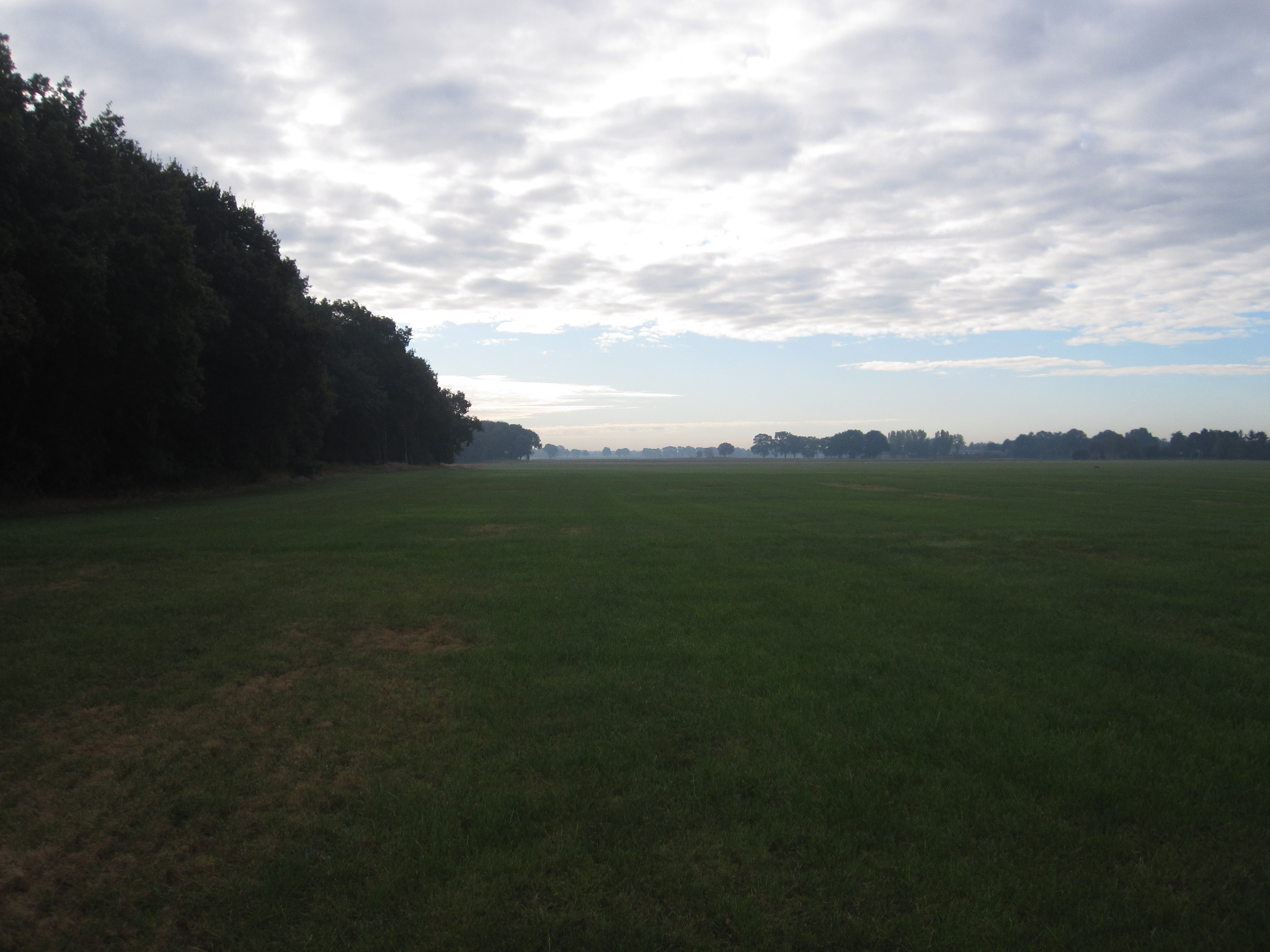
- Field near Bruchterveld

- Location in province of Overijssel in the Netherlands Bruchterveld (Netherlands)
- Coordinates: 52°31′48″N 6°39′39″E
- Country: Netherlands
- Province: Overijssel
- Municipality: Hardenberg

Area
  - Total: 10.59 km^{2} (4.09 sq mi)
- Elevation: 10 m (33 ft)

Population (2021)
  - Total: 1,110
  - Density: 105/km^{2} (271/sq mi)
- Time zone: UTC+1 (CET)
  - Summer (DST): UTC+2 (CEST)
- Postal code: 7695
- Dialing code: 0524

Bruchterveld is a village near the town of Hardenberg, Overijssel, the Netherlands. There is a village house and a football association. It has three churches: Dutch reformed, Dutch reformed freed and Reformed.

== History ==
It was first mentioned in 1868 Bruchter Veld, and means "field belonging to Brucht". It was a heath and peat area which was excavated during the 19th and early 20th century.
