= Avereest =

Coordinates: 52°37′N 6°22′E

- Former municipality
- Flag Coat of arms
- Interactive map of Avereest
- Country: Netherlands
- Province: Overijssel
- Municipality: Hardenberg
- Established: 1818
- Main settlement: Dedemsvaart

Area
  - Total: 74.23 km^{2} (28.66 sq mi)
  - Land: 73.69 km^{2} (28.45 sq mi)
  - Water: 0.54 km^{2} (0.21 sq mi)

Population (22 June 2000)
  - Total: 15.330
  - Density: 203/km^{2} (530/sq mi)
- Postal codes: 7701-7702, 7707

Avereest is a former municipality in the Dutch province of Overijssel. The area covered the location of the town Dedemsvaart.

In 2001, the area was abolished and merged into Hardenberg.
