= Rheeze =

Neighbourhood (Angerdorf) in the Netherlands

- Village
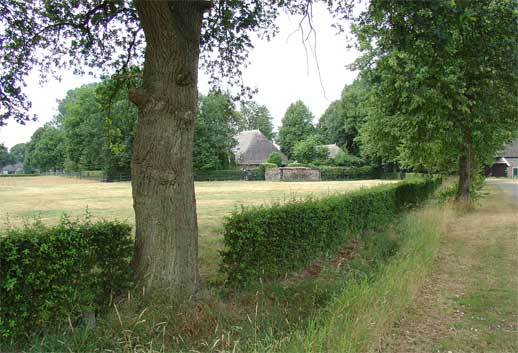
- Overijssel Vechtdal

- Location in province of Overijssel in the Netherlands Rheeze (Netherlands)
- Coordinates: 52.5473°N 6.5807°E
- Country: Netherlands
- Provinces: Overijssel
- Municipality: Hardenberg

Area
  - Total: 6.58 km^{2} (2.54 sq mi)
- Elevation: 9 m (30 ft)

Population (2021)
  - Total: 285
  - Density: 43.3/km^{2} (112/sq mi)
- Time zone: UTC+1 (CET)
  - Summer (DST): UTC+2 (CEST)
- Postal code: 7794
- Dialing code: 0523

Rheeze is an Angerdorf in the municipality of Hardenberg in the Dutch province of Overijssel. As of 2020, the population of Rheeze was 285.

Rheeze has been inhabited since the early Middle Ages. At the end of 1992, part of the core of Rheeze was designated as a protected townscape. In the core of Rheeze, there is also a site of high archaeological value, which means that archaeological research is required for soil activities deeper than 40 centimeters.

== Etymology ==
The church reformer Albertus Risaeus was born in 1510 in Rheeze; the Latin name 'Risaeus' refers to this. However, he was also known as Albert(us) Hardenberg, after the town near Rheeze. He left for Groningen at the age of 7, where there were better educational opportunities.

== Recreation area ==
Due to the location of Rheeze in the green Overijssel Vechtdal, tourism also plays a very important role in Rheeze. There are many campsites, mainly on the Grote Beltenweg, which house thousands of campers every year.

== De Oldemeijer ==
The Oldemeijer is a recreational lake in the Hardenberg forestry, near Rheeze. There is a beach around the lake and in the middle an island that can be reached by swimming or via two foot bridges. There are toilets and there is a kiosk where snacks are available.
