= Slagharen =

- Village
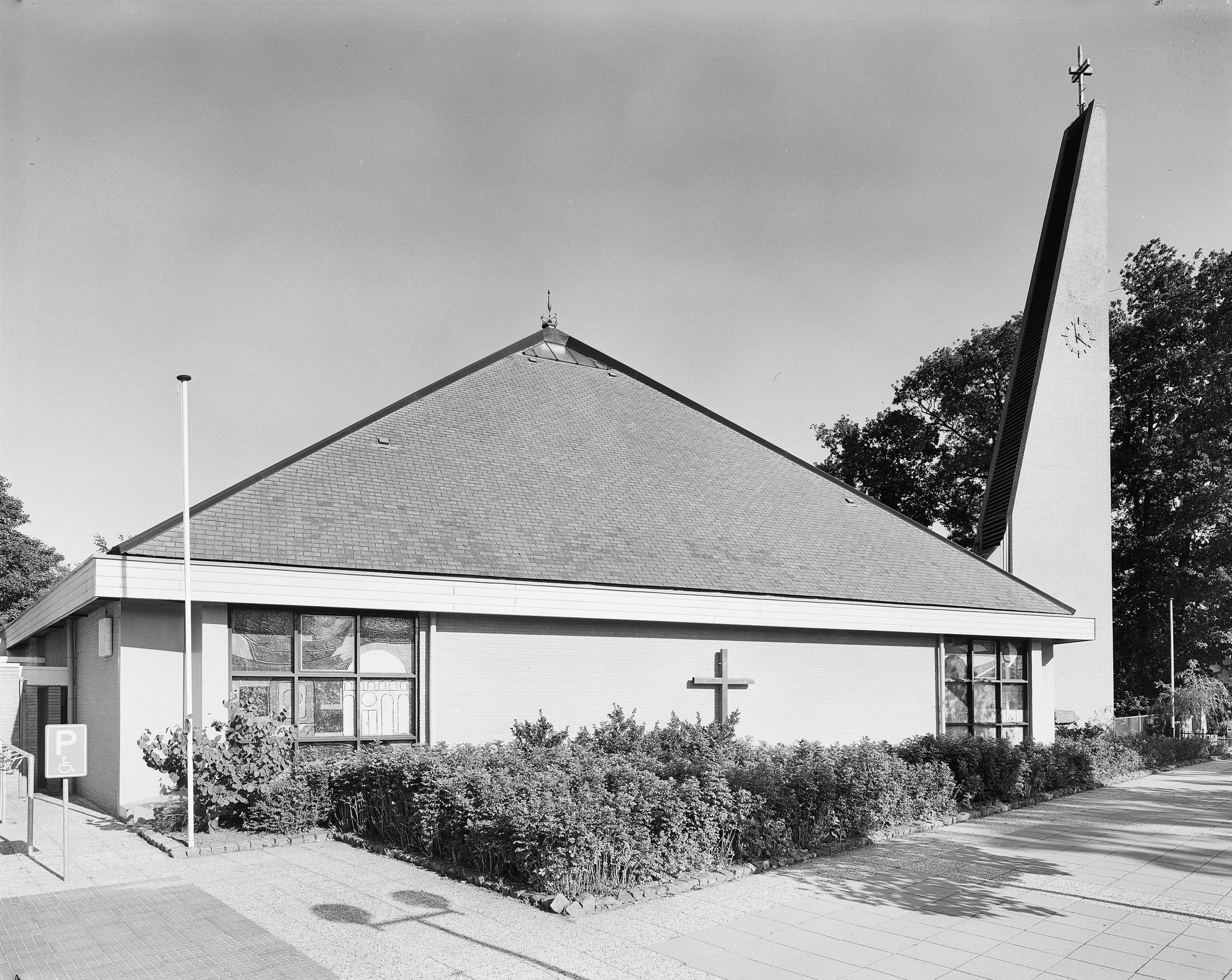
- The church of Slagharen

- Location in province of Overijssel in the Netherlands Slagharen (Netherlands)
- Coordinates: 52.6250°N 6.5527°E
- Country: Netherlands
- Province: Overijssel
- Municipality: Hardenberg

Area
  - Total: 12.07 km^{2} (4.66 sq mi)
- Elevation: 9 m (30 ft)

Population (2021)
  - Total: 3,125
  - Density: 258.9/km^{2} (670.6/sq mi)
- Time zone: UTC+1 (CET)
  - Summer (DST): UTC+2 (CEST)
- Postal code: 7776
- Dialing code: 0523

Slagharen is a village in the municipality of Hardenberg in the province of Overijssel, Netherlands. The village started as a peat excavation village. It is known for the Attractiepark Slagharen, an amusement park.

== History ==
In 1832, the Lutterhoofdwijk canal was dug as a side canal of the Dedemsvaart to excavate the peat in the area and the village was established along the canal, however, in 1830, a community of 81 people was recorded at the site. All except for a Frisian family were from neighbouring Germany, and were living in sod houses on the moorland.

In 1844, the name Slagharen first appeared, and means "parcel [of land] on sandy ground". The predominantly German settlers resulted in the founding of a Catholic church in 1843. The church was replaced in 1967. In 1859, the gristmill De Pionier was built near the village. In 1975, it was bought by the amusement park and restored.

In 1952, Wehkamp, a mail order company, opened in Slagharen. It quickly developed into one of largest mail order companies of the Netherlands. In 1975, it moved to Zwolle, and is nowadays a large online shop.

In 1963, the Ponypark Slagharen opened where you could stay in a holiday house with your own Shetland pony. In 1972, it turned into an amusement park.

== Notable people ==
- Chantal Beltman (born 1976), former professional cyclist
- Gerard Nijkamp (born 1970) is a football player and manager

== Gallery ==
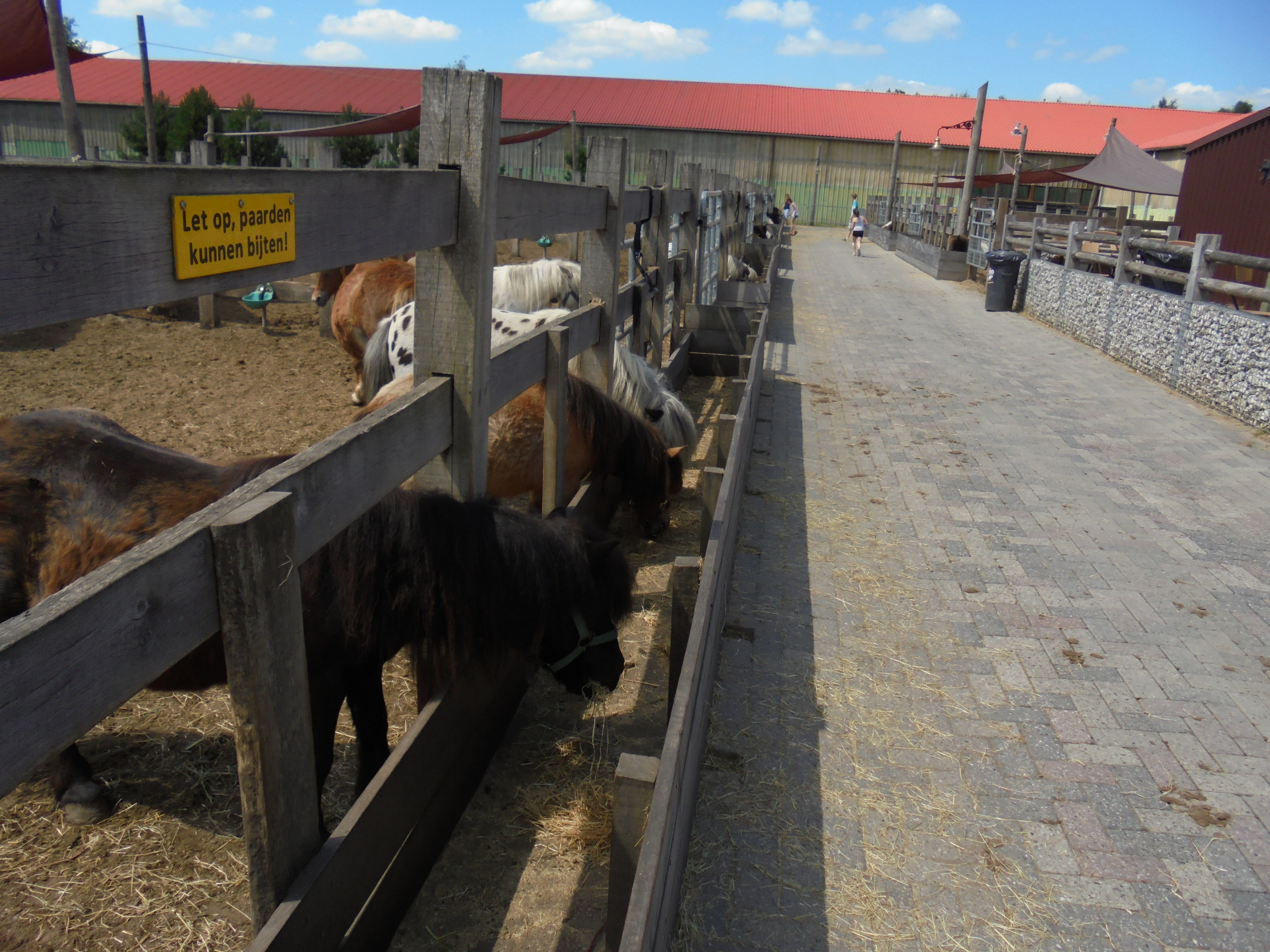
The ponies at the former ponypark

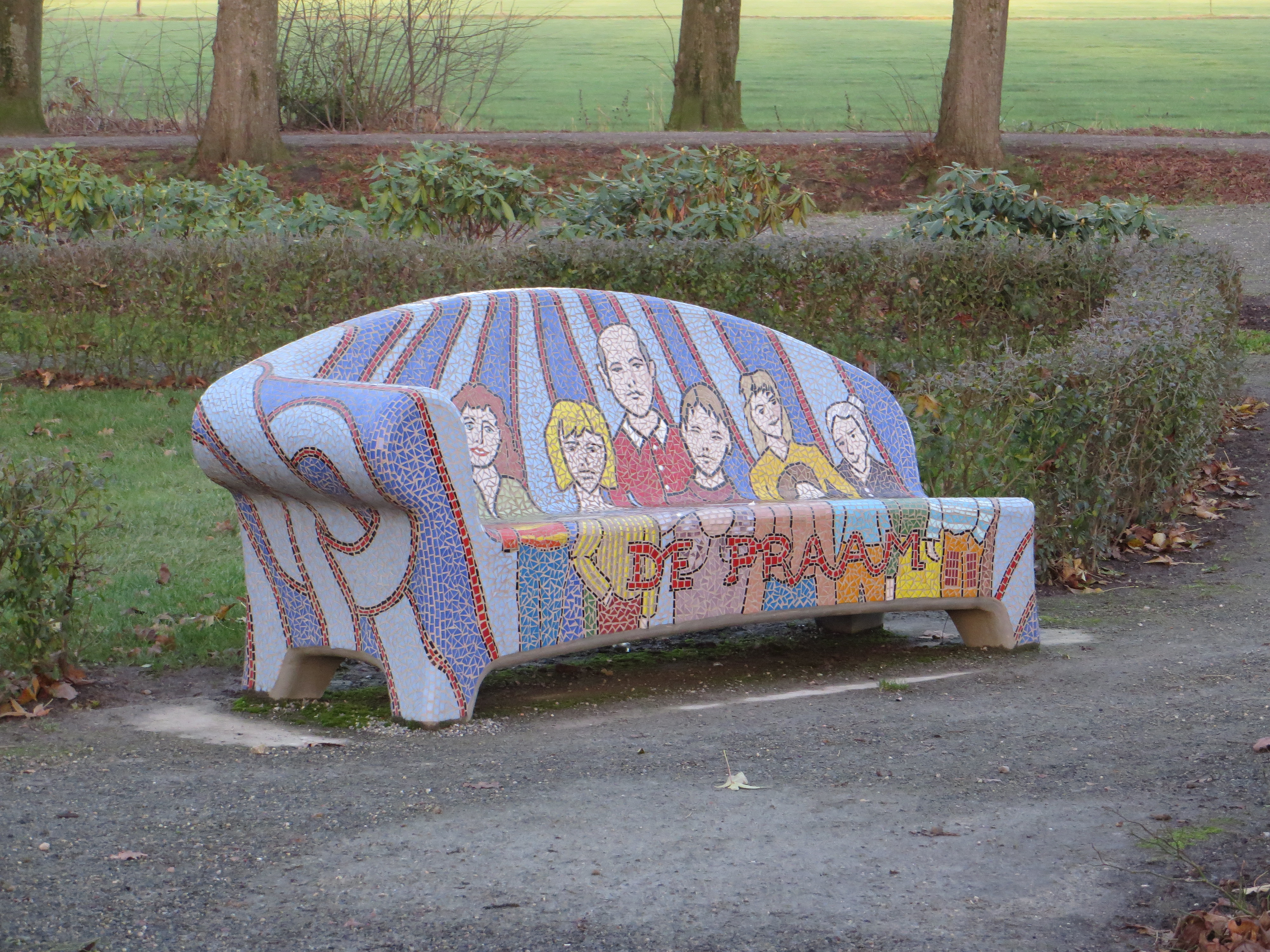
Social sofa in Slagharen

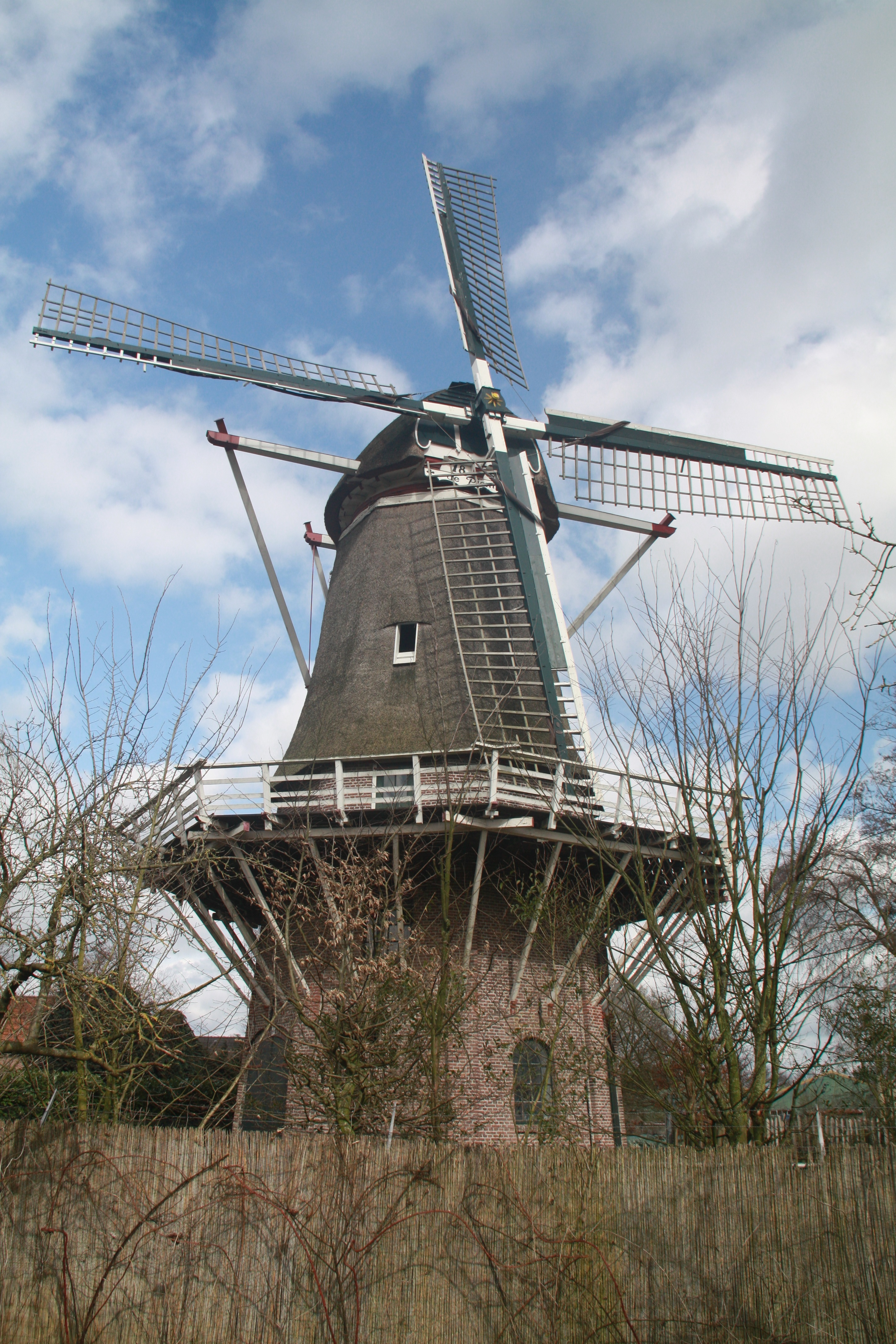
Windmill De Pionier
