= Ambt Hardenberg =

Coordinates: 52°33′N 6°36′E

Ambt Hardenberg is a former municipality in the Dutch province of Overijssel. It consisted of the countryside surrounding the city of Hardenberg, which was a separate municipality.

Ambt Hardenberg existed from 1818 to 1941, when it became a part of Hardenberg.

== See also ==
- Stad Hardenberg
