= Hardenberg =

Hardenberg Haddenbarreg (Dutch Low Saxon)
- City and municipality
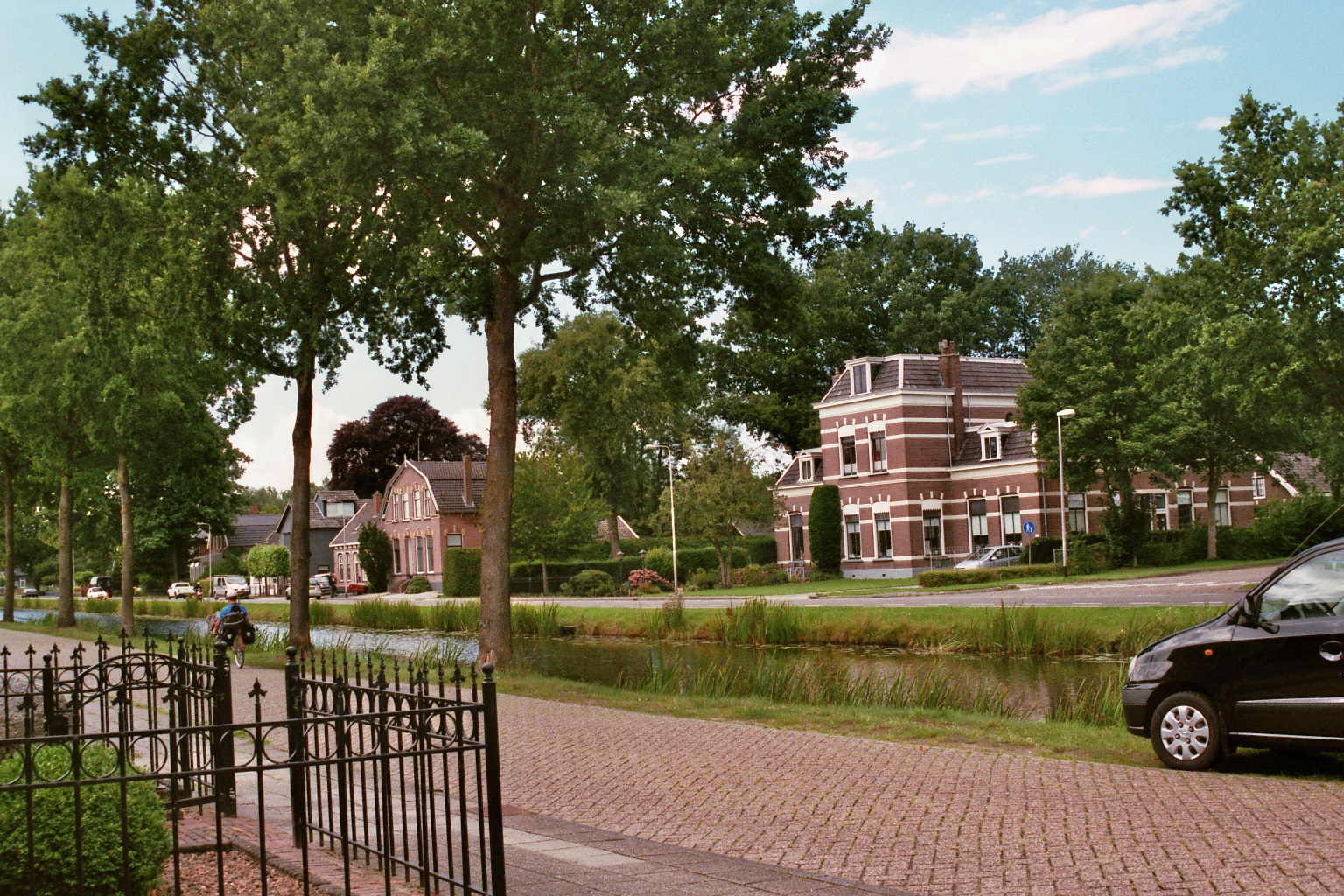
- Former headquarters of the Dedemsvaartsche Stoomtramweg-Maatschappij in Dedemsvaart

- Flag Coat of arms

- Location in Overijssel
- Coordinates: 52°34′N 6°37′E
- Country: Netherlands
- Province: Overijssel

Government
  - Body: Municipal council
  - Mayor: Maarten Offinga (CDA)

Area
  - Total: 317.15 km^{2} (122.45 sq mi)
  - Land: 312.28 km^{2} (120.57 sq mi)
  - Water: 4.87 km^{2} (1.88 sq mi)
- Elevation: 9 m (30 ft)

Population (January 2021)
  - Total: 61,357
  - Density: 196/km^{2} (510/sq mi)
- Demonym: Hardenberger
- Time zone: UTC+1 (CET)
  - Summer (DST): UTC+2 (CEST)
- Postcode: 7690–7704, 7707, 7770–7799
- Area code: 0523
- Website: www.hardenberg.nl

Hardenberg (Dutch: [ˈɦɑrdə(m)bɛr(ə)x]; Dutch Low Saxon: Haddenbarreg or 'n Arnbarg) is a city and municipality in the province of Overijssel in north-eastern Netherlands. It has borders with the province of Drenthe and an international German border. The population of Hardenberg municipality is 63,895 (in 2025). Other than Hardenberg itself, the second largest population center is Dedemsvaart, and Gramsbergen is the only other city in the municipality.

The city of Hardenberg received city rights in 1362 and today has 20.285 inhabitants. It is located to the south-west of Coevorden, south-east of Hoogeveen, and north of Almelo. The Vecht river flows through it and the municipality (together with Ommen and Dalfsen) makes up the Vechtdal (Vecht Valley) area. A sizable portion of the population speaks Dutch Low Saxon as a native language.

The municipality Hardenberg was formed on 1 May 1941 during the Reichskommissariat Niederlande period from merging Stad Hardenberg with Ambt Hardenberg, which was headquartered in Heemse. In January 2001, the municipalities Avereest and Gramsbergen were merged into Hardenberg to form a new, larger municipality.

== History ==
Around the year 760, the village of Nijenstede is said to have originated just east of the present-day center of Hardenberg, where, according to Johan Picardt, the Frankish steward Pepin the Short built a chapel.

In 1227, the bishop of Utrecht Otto II of Lippe was defeated and killed during the Battle of Ane by Rudolph van Coevorden, who led a Drenths rebellion. Because of this, the new bishop Wilbrand of Oldenburg built a castle to the west of Nijenstede called Hardenberch (or Herdenbergh/Hardenborch) in 1230, protected to the north and west by the Vecht and on other sides by dugged moat.

Bishop John of Arkel replaced the castle with a new fortress in 1354. Four years later, he had the castle mound leveled, creating space for the construction of an oval stone wall around the castle, complete with towers and blockhouses. The resulting fortress measured 125 by 60 meters. This proved large enough to accommodate residents, and more and more inhabitants moved from Nijenstede to the safe haven of Hardenberg, creating a new town. In 1362, Bishop Arkel transferred Nijenstede's old rights and privileges to this new settlement, Hardenberg, and also granted it city rights. Two years later, Emperor Charles IV authorized the establishment of a toll in Hardenberg. The toll revenues enabled the maintenance of the Hardenberg fortress, which guarded the borders of Overijssel.

In 1386, the castle was further fortified and embellished. The town also received a new wall. On 5 March 1497, Hardenberg was almost entirely destroyed by a fire. Gramsbergen received city rights in 1442.

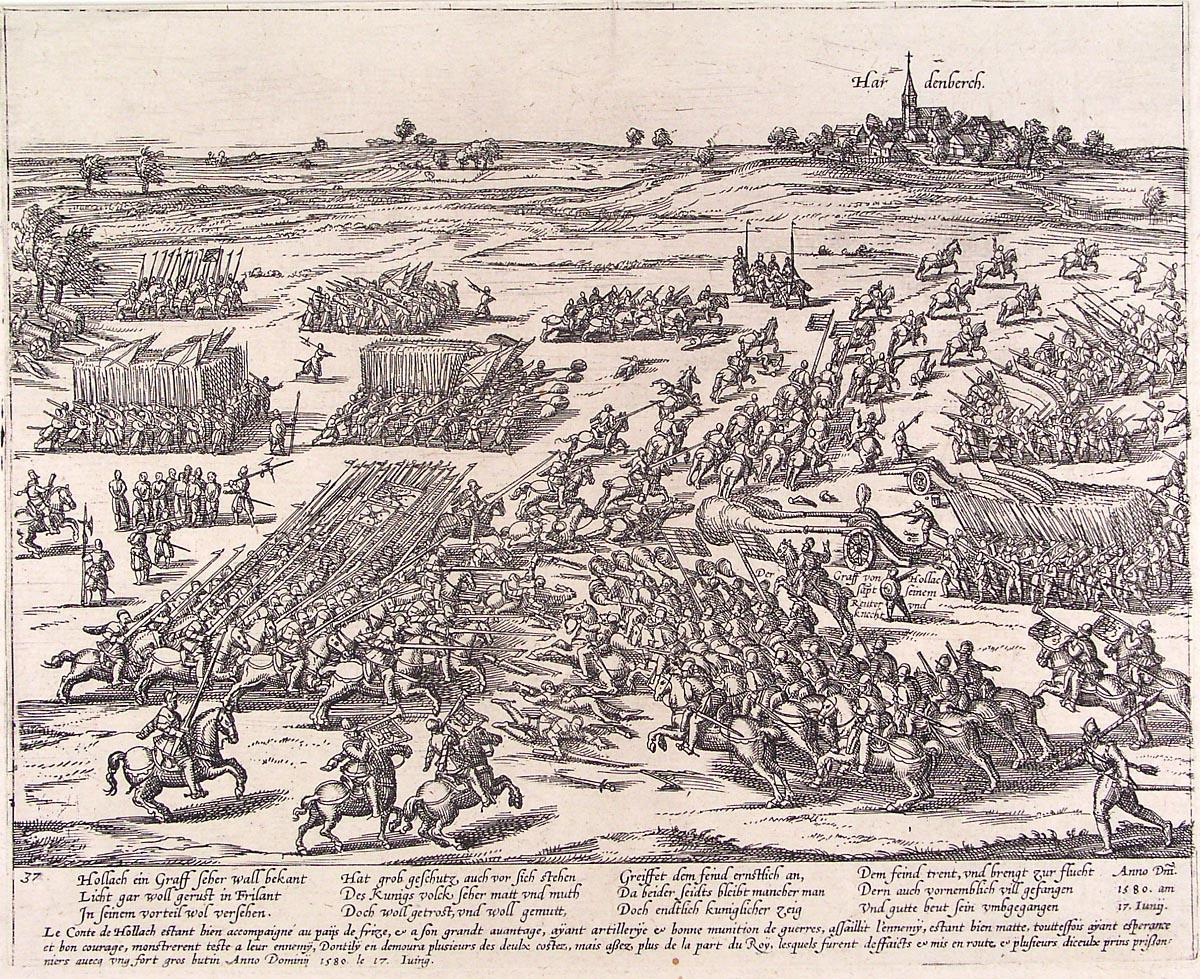
Battle on the fields of Hardenberg on the 17th of June, 1580

In the 15th century, Hardenberg was no longer mentioned as a border fortress. It likely become redundant due to nearby Coevorden and the defenses at Venebrugge and Brucht. Hardenberg did, however, continue to serve as the bishop's residence. In 1518, Bishop Philip of Burgundy ordered the demolition of Hardenberg castle and the fortress wall as well. Since 1959, sections of the old fortress wall have been uncovered and preserved. The Höftekerk now stands on the site where the castle once stood.

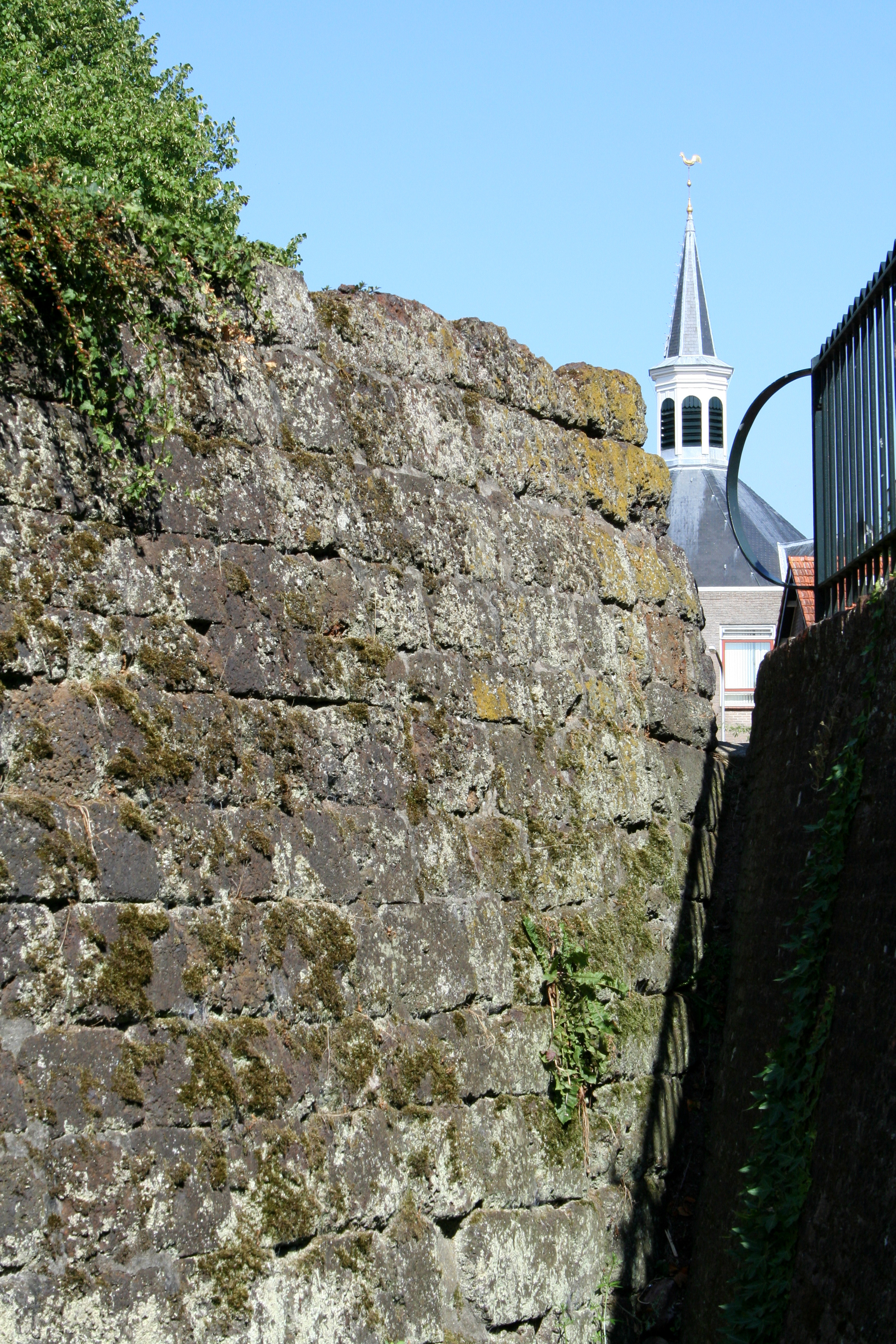
Part of the remaining wall (the Höftekerk is in the background)

On 18 May 1708, a woman named Aaltje Kraak accidentally caused a fire that destroyed almost all of the city of Hardenberg. The hundred wooden houses that made up the town were almost all destroyed. The town was rebuilt with stone houses after a national fundraising campaign.

The town was also known as Klepperstad because it was one of the places with a Klepperman, a type of night watchman (and serving as a fire watchman and town crier) who made his rounds with a clapper.

There was also a small Jewish community in Hardenberg. During German occupation, almost all of these perished in death camps in Poland. The synagogue of Hardenberg was sold in 1948 and was demolished in 1980.

In the post-war years, Hardenberg's town center was modernized, causing much of its original character to be lost. In the late 1950s, Wavin, a plastic pipe factory, established its main production facility in Hardenberg. This company grew into a multinational that manufactured plastic crates and bags, among other things. It became by far the largest employer in Hardenberg. In the 1990s, the company refocused on pipes, and the other operations at the Hardenberg site were sold.

Hardenberg has grown considerably. From the 1960s onwards, several residential areas were built near the village of Heemse, just across the Vecht river, and in the 1970s a residential area of the same name was built on the site of the hamlet of Baalder. Since 2000 new industrial and residential areas have again expanded the town size. A new municipality headquarter building was built in 2008. It was voted the ugliest newly built building by construction magazine Cobouw.

== Geography ==
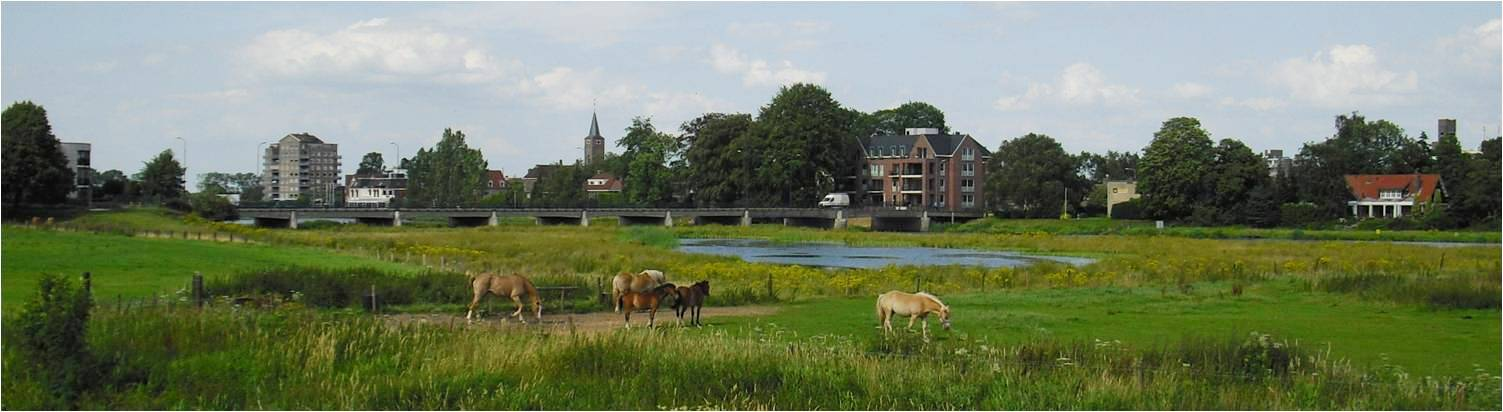
Hardenberg city with the Vecht

The river Vecht enters the area from Emlichheim and Laar in Germany then flows through Gramsbergen and Hardenberg west towards Ommen, Dalfsen and Zwolle before entering the Zuiderzee. Also the Almelo-de Haandrik canal is in active use and crosses the Vecht at De Haandrik.

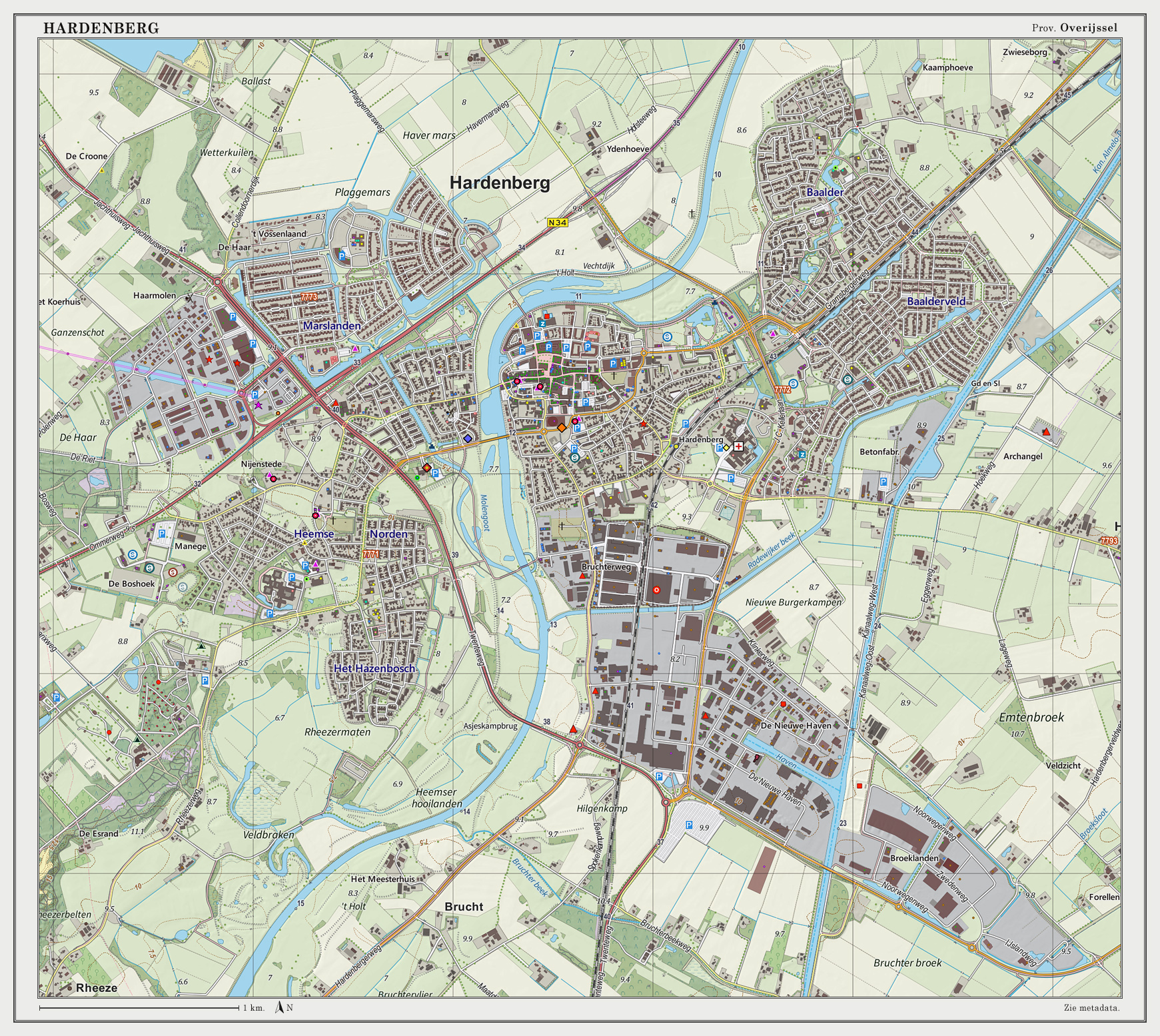
Map of Hardenberg (city), June 2014

Areas of Hardenberg city are:

- Baalder
- Baalderveld
- Centrum
- Hazenbos
- Heemse
- Heemserbos
- Heemsermars
- Marslanden
- Norden

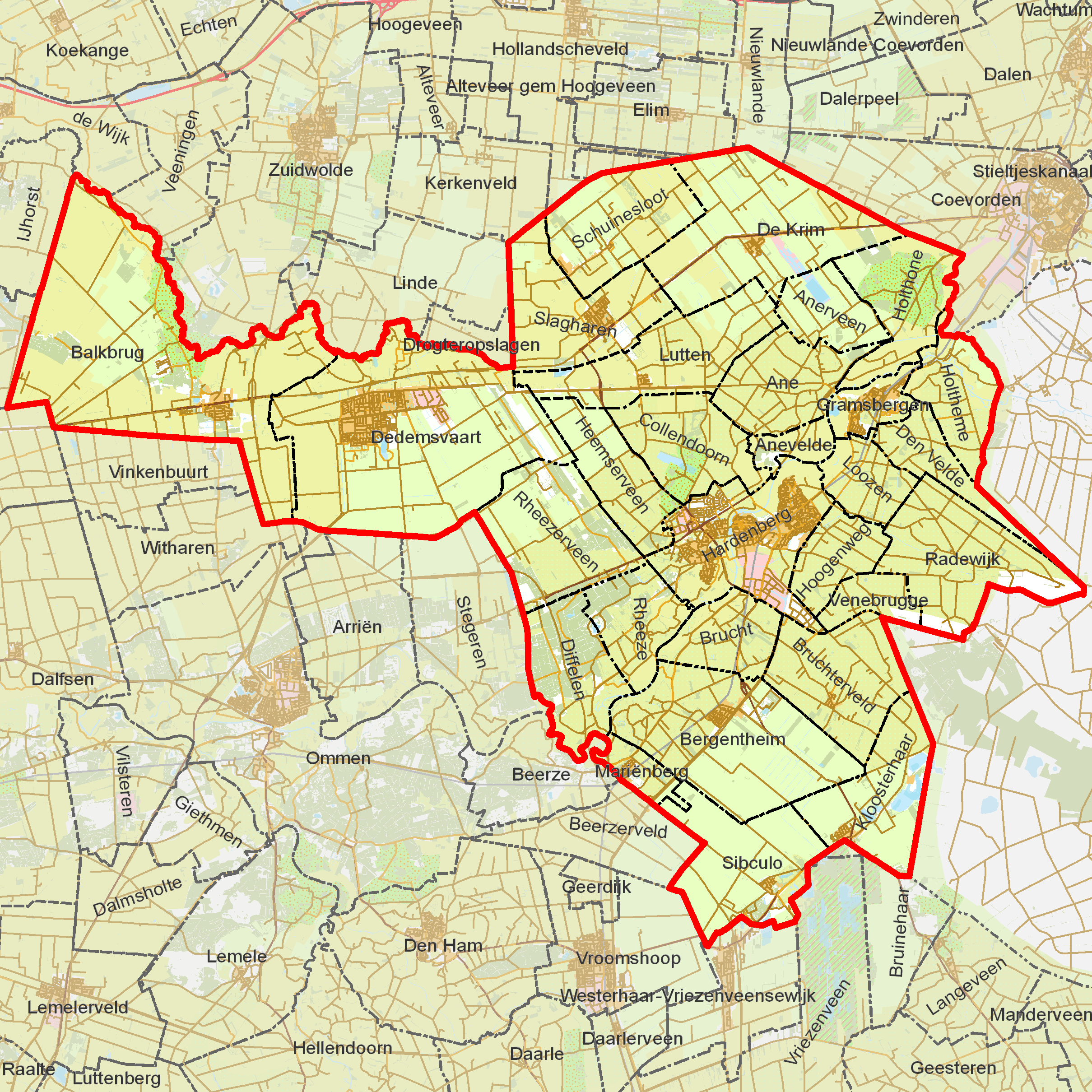
Map of Hardenberg municipality

Population centers in the municipality are:

- Ane
- Anerveen
- Anevelde
- Balkbrug
- Balkbrug Benedenvaart
- Bergentheim
- Bergentheimerveen
- Beute
- Brucht
- Bruchterveld
- Colenbranderbos
- Collendoorn
- De Belt
- De Haandrik
- De Kolonie
- De Krim
- Dedemsvaart
- Den Velde
- Diffelen
- Gramsbergen
- 't Haantje
- Hardenbergerveld
- Heemserveen
- Holtheme
- Holthone
- Hoogenweg
- Kloosterhaar
- Loozen
- Lutten
- Mariënberg
- Nieuwlande
- Ommerkanaal
- Oud-Bergentheim
- Oud-Lutten
- Radewijk
- Reestgebied
- Rheeze
- Rheezerveen
- Rheezerzand
- Rollepaal
- Schuinesloot
- Sibculo
- Slagharen
- Sponturfwijk
- Steekport
- Venebrugge
- Westerhuizingerveld

== Transport ==
The famous Pieterpad passes through Hardenberg.

=== Road ===
The N34 is a major provincial road that connects Hardenberg to Coevorden and Emmen. N36 is another provincial road with connections to Ommen and Almelo. N48 connects the area to Ommen and Hoogeveen.

=== Rail ===
There are three railway stations in Hardenberg: Gramsbergen station, Hardenberg station, and Mariënberg station. All were opened in 1905 and are on the Zwolle-Emmen line. Hardenberg and Mariënberg stations are also on the Hardenberg-Almelo line. Together both these train lines are also known as the Vechtdallijnen (Vechtdal Lines). In 2025 funding was also given for the Nedersaksenlijn (Lower Saxony Line) which will connect Groningen with Twente.

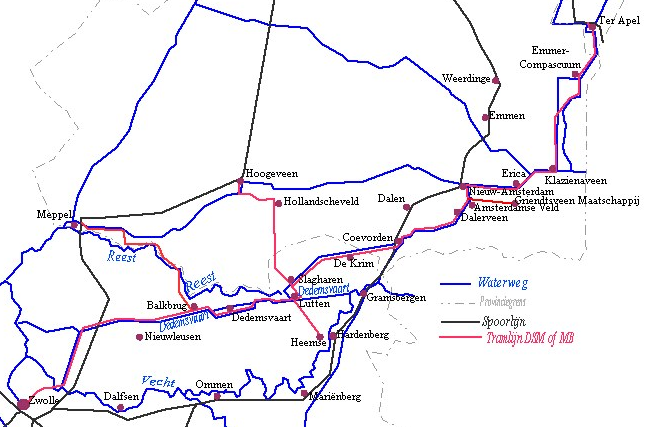
Map of the old DSM routes

In 1886, the Dedemsvaartsche Stoomtramweg-Maatschappij (DSM) company headquartered in Dedemsvaart opened its first lines of steam tram services between Dedemsvaart and Avereest and another line from Lutten to Heemse (terminating on the other side of the Vecht river, saving the cost of a bridge to Hardenberg). The network expanded to more places in and around this region. All DSM lines had closed down by 1947.

== Sports ==
HHC Hardenberg is the local football club of Hardenberg. They play in the Tweede Divisie league. They are based at De Boshoek.

== Religion ==
Hardenberg is predominantly Protestant in religious terms. The Dutch Reformed Churches (NGK) are particularly well represented. It has four church buildings divided among six congregations. The congregations of the Protestant Church in the Netherlands (PKN) also have a large number of members. The village of Slagharen is a predominantly Catholic exclave in Hardenberg.

== Tourism and events ==
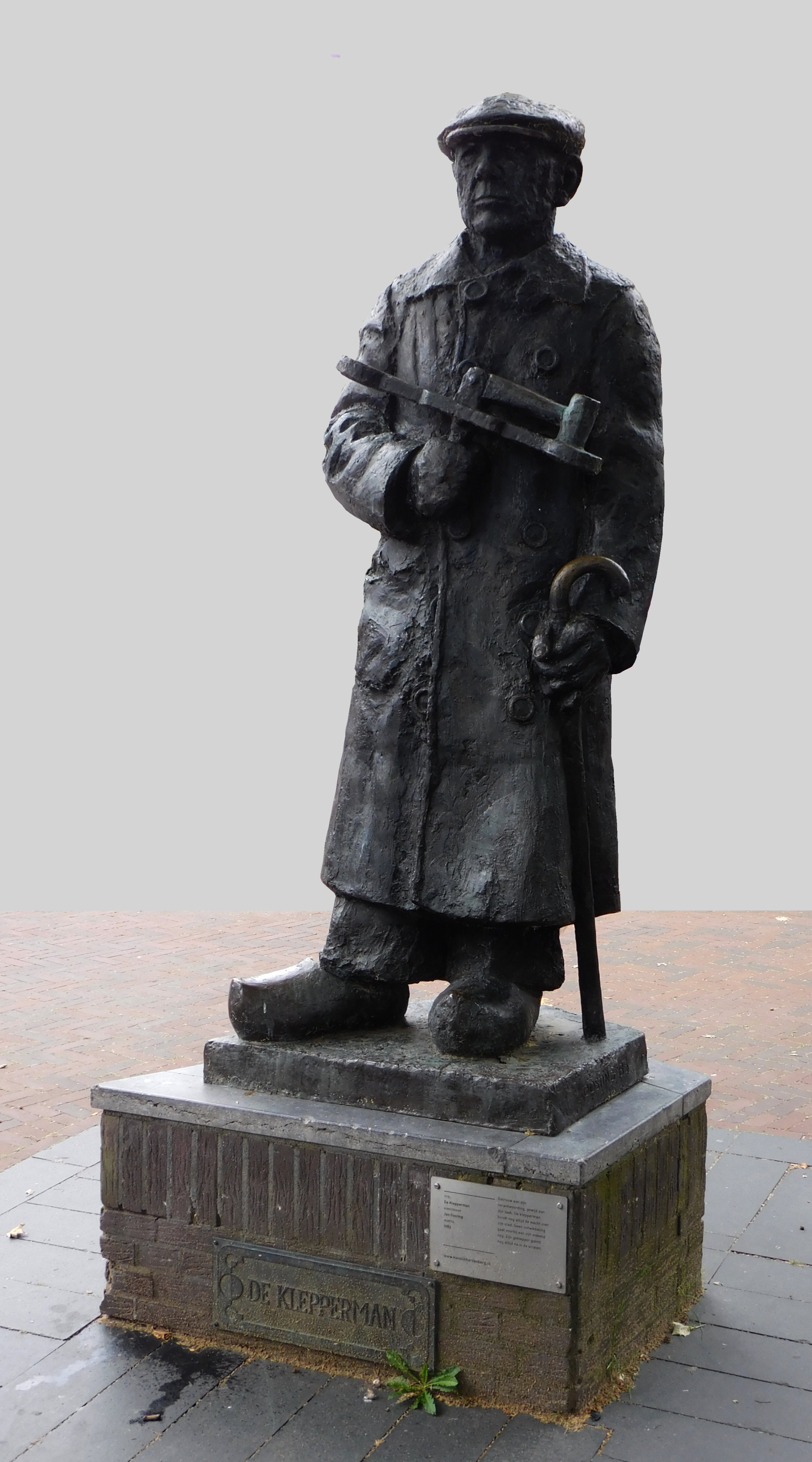
Klepperman statue

During the summer months, the city of Hardenberg profiles itself as a "klepperstad" and organizes many activities under that banner, such as the four-day evening walk, the annual hot air balloon festival, and various small events and parties.

Tourism is a common sector within the municipality. The Vechtdal area contains a lot of campsites for people on vacation and there is a recreational lake De Oldemeijer located in Rheeze. More than 1 million annual visitors also visit Attractiepark Slagharen, one of the largest theme parks of the Netherlands, which is located in Slagharen.

== Notable people ==
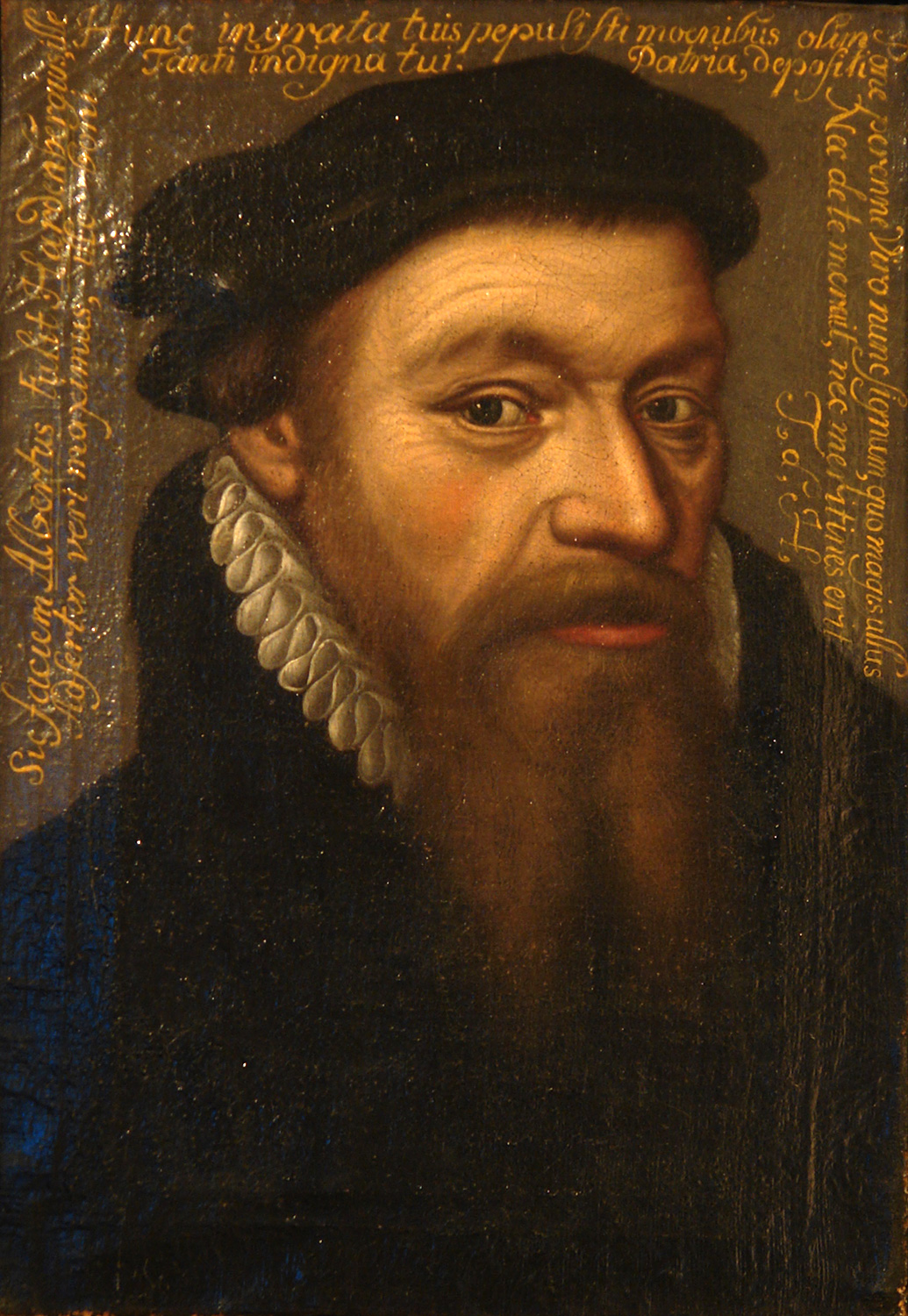
Albert Hardenberg

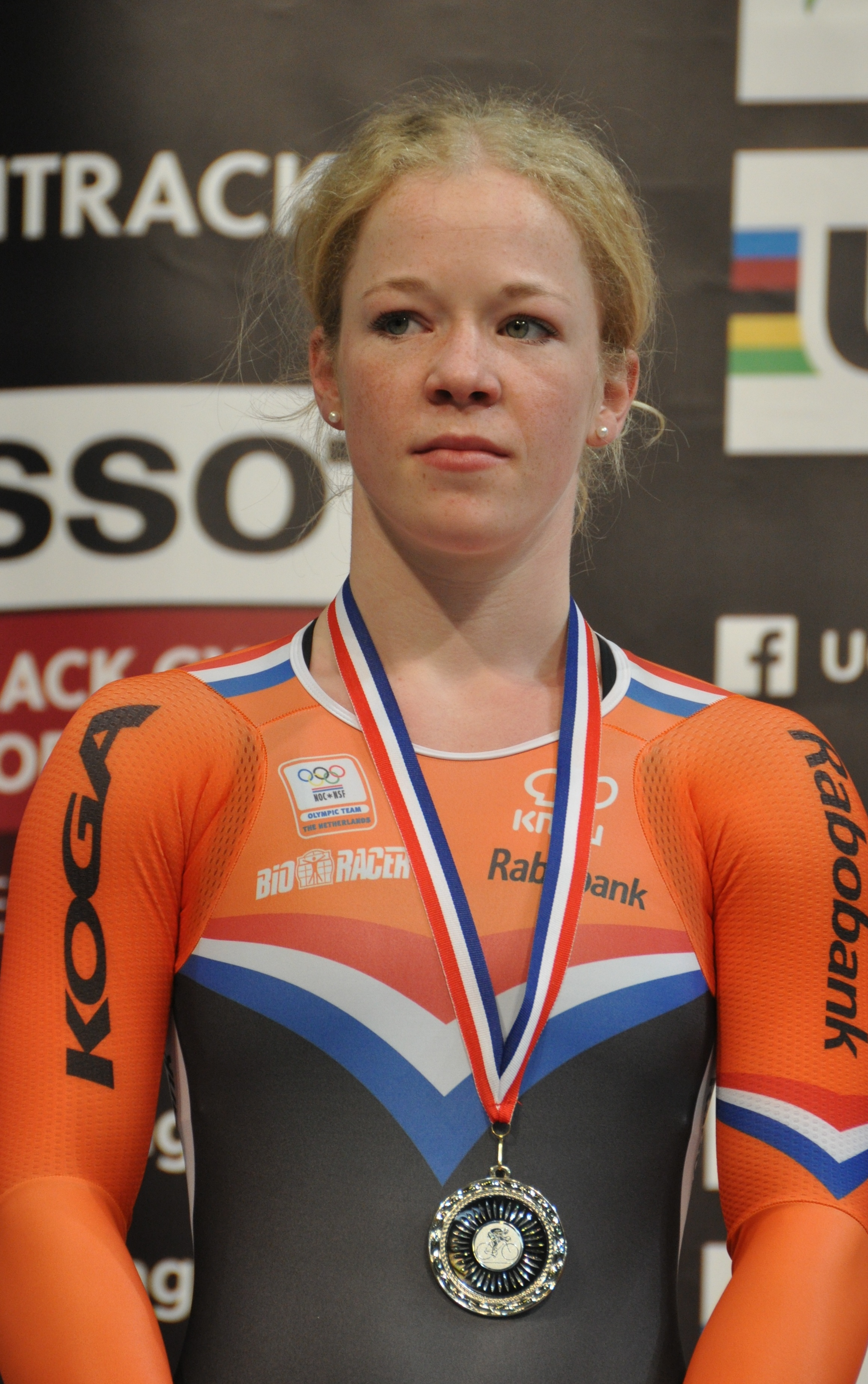
Kyra Lamberink, 2016

- Albert Hardenberg (c.1510 in Rheeze – 1574) a Reformed theologian and Protestant reformer
- Aaltje Kraak (17th century – 18th century) a Dutch woman who caused a major fire in Hardenberg in 1708
- Henk Dorgelo (1894 in Dedemsvaart – 1961) a Dutch physicist and academic
- Anna Charlotte Ruys (1898 in Dedemsvaart – 1977) a Dutch professor of bacteriology and epidemiology
- Mien Ruys (1904 in Dedemsvaart – 1999) a Dutch landscape and garden architect
- August Aimé Balkema (1906 in Avereest – 1996) a Dutch book trader and publisher active in Amsterdam and South Africa
- Henk Bodewitz (1939 in Gramsbergen – 2022) is a Dutch Sanskrit scholar
- Martin Koster (born 1950 in Dedemsvaart) a Dutch writer in the Drèents variety of Dutch Low Saxon
- Joke Bouwstra (born 1956 in Hardenberg) a Dutch researcher and professor of drug administration at Leiden University
- Roel Kuiper (born 1962 in Mariënberg) a Dutch historian, philosopher, ideologue, politician and university professor
- Agnes Mulder (born 1973 in Hardenberg) a Dutch politician (King's Commissioner of Drenthe)
- Roos-Anne (Sanne) Hans (born 1984 in Dedemsvaart) known as lead singer of the band Miss Montreal is a Dutch singer-songwriter and guitar player

=== Sport ===
- Erik Hartsuiker (1940 in Avereest – 2019) a retired Dutch rower, bronze medallist at the 1964 Summer Olympics
- Helen Tanger (born 1978 in Hardenberg) is a rower and bronze medallist at the 2004 Summer Olympics
- Arne Slot (born 1978 in Bergentheim) a former Dutch professional football midfielder with 450 caps
- Kyra Lamberink (born 1996 in Bergentheim) a Dutch female track cyclist
- Niek Kimmann (born 1996 in Lutten) a Dutch male BMX racing cyclist and gold medallist at the 2020 Summer Olympics
- Kas Haverkort (born 2003 in Hardenberg) a Dutch racing driver and Spanish F4 champion

== Image gallery ==
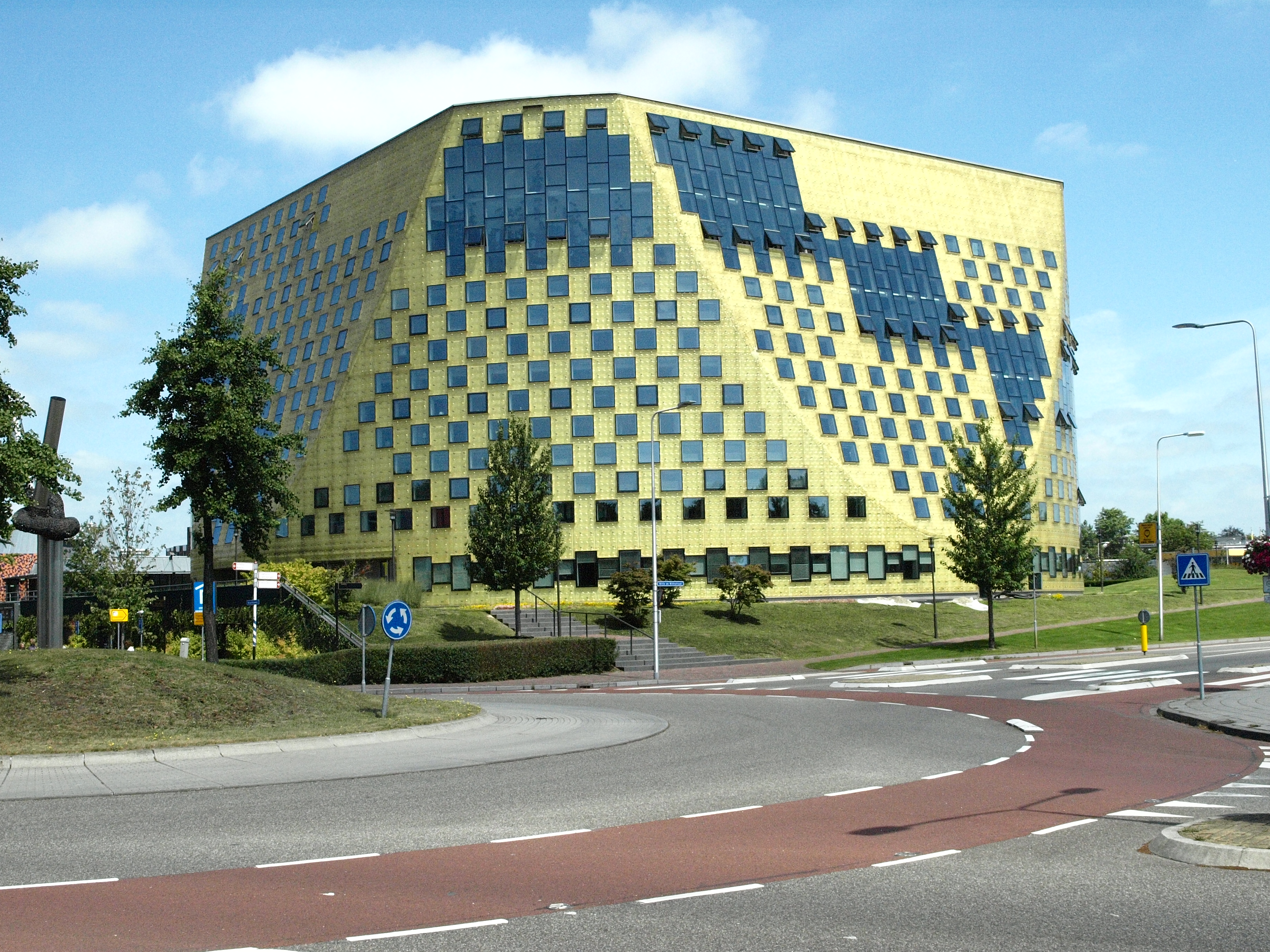
Hardenberg Town Hall

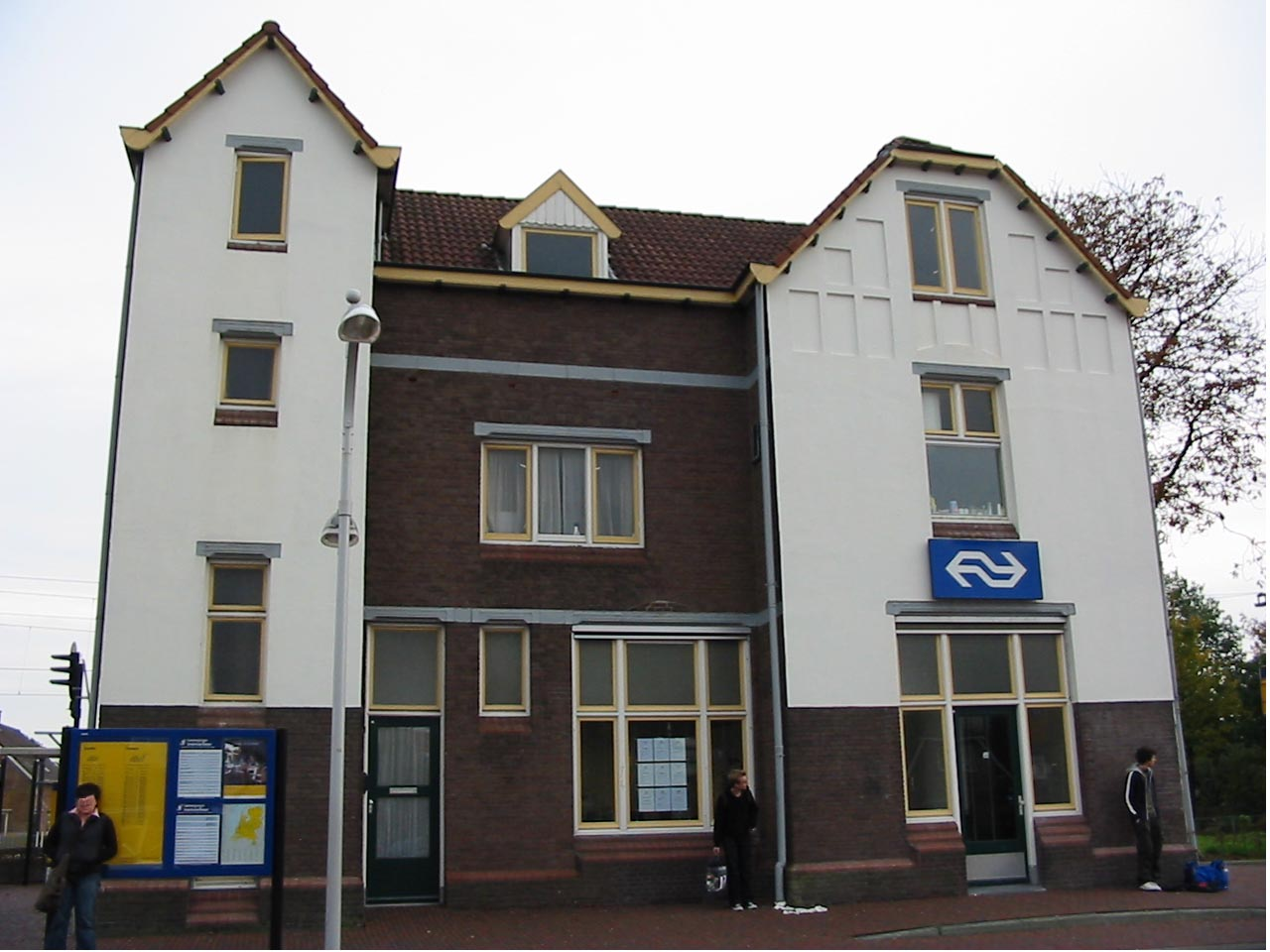
Hardenberg Station

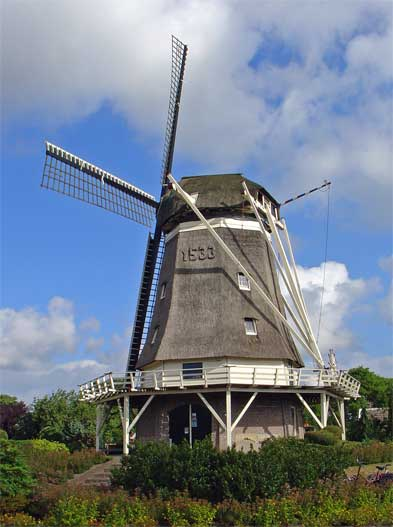
De Oelemölle windmill in Hardenberg

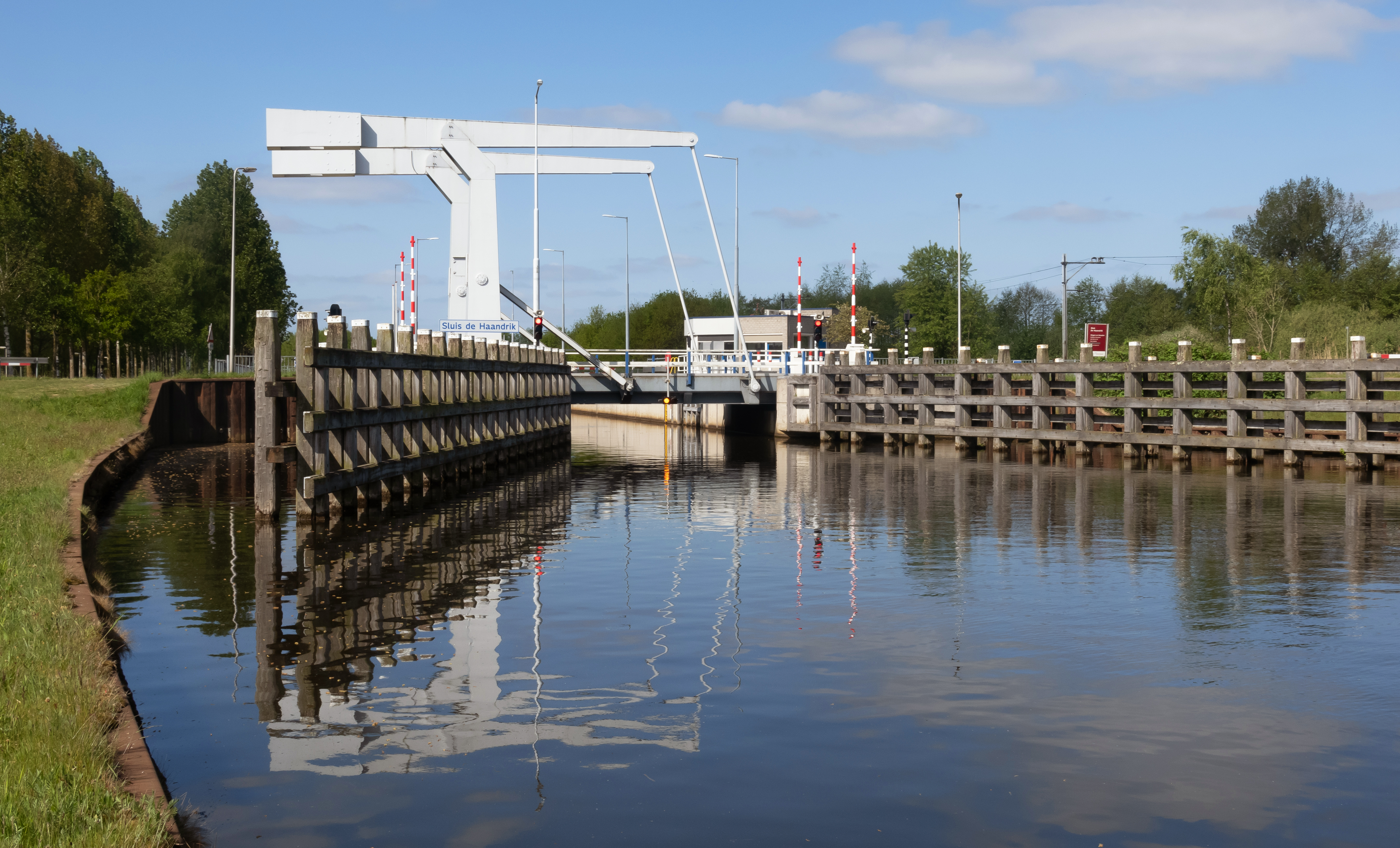
Lock: Sluis De Haandrik

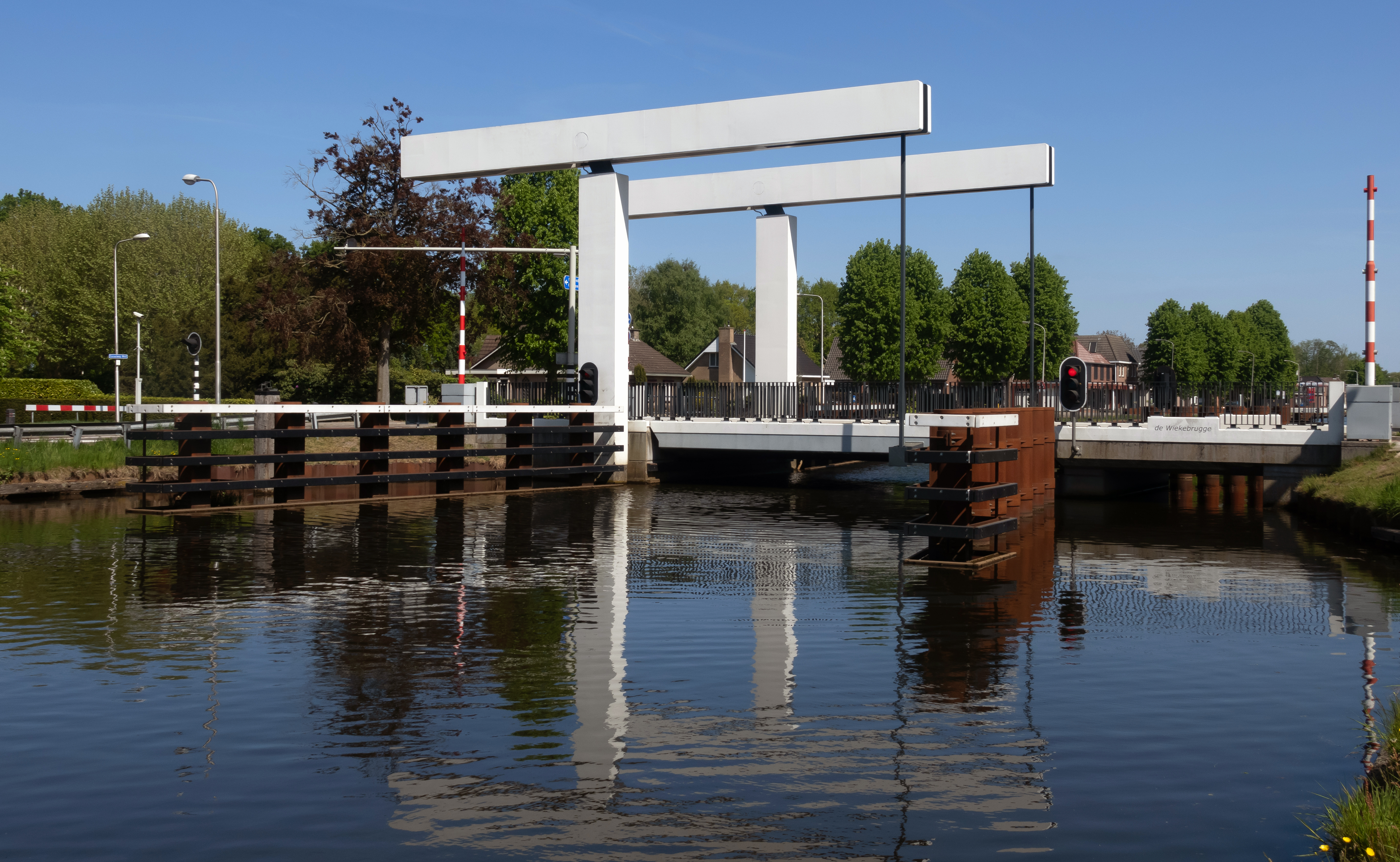
Bergentheim, drawingbridge: the Wiekebrugge

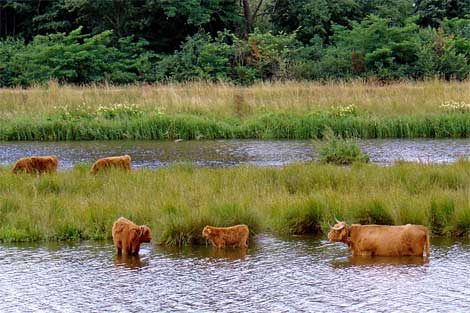
A lake by the Vecht
