= Ane, Overijssel =

Ane Oane
- Hamlet
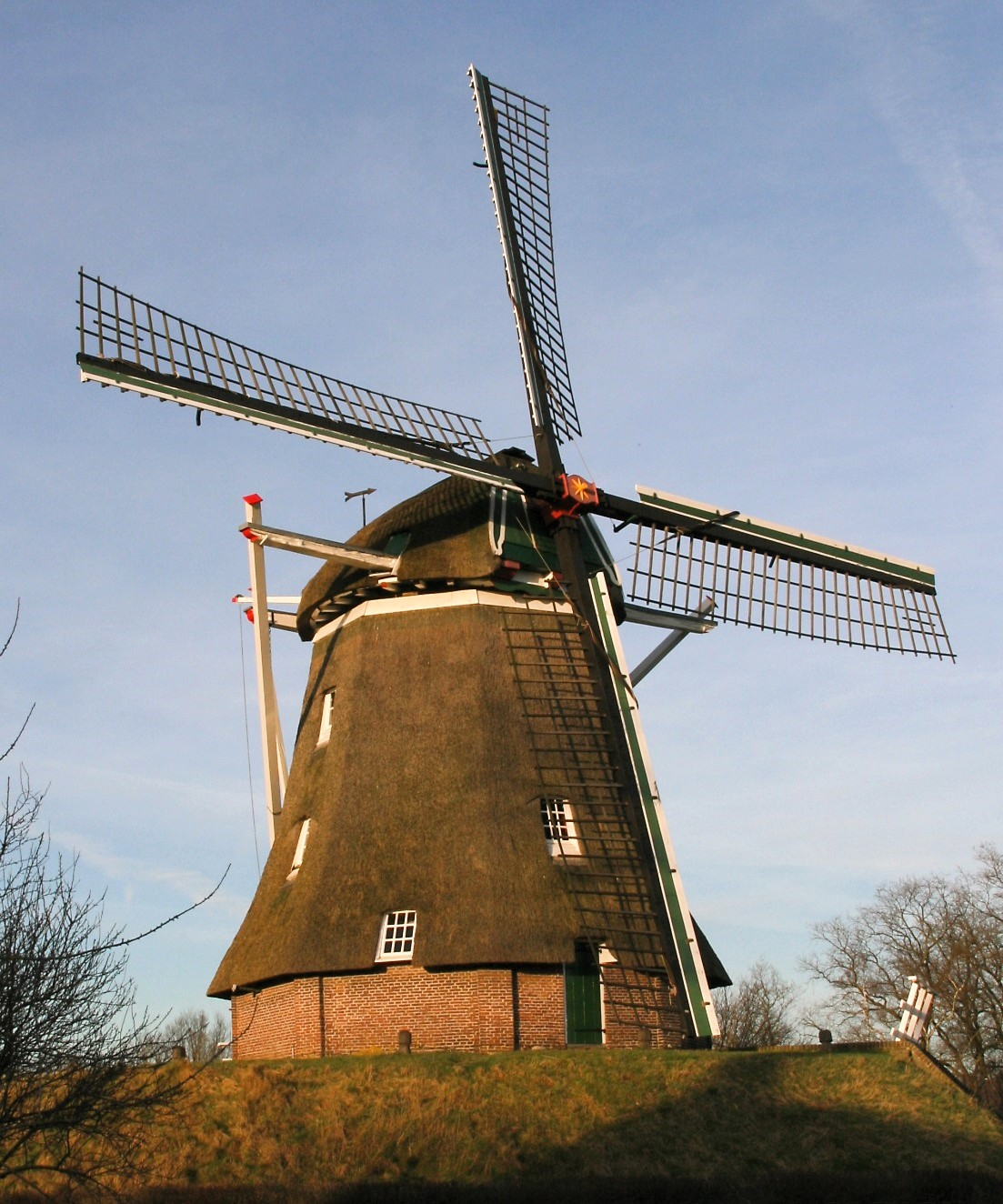
- The Anermolen (windmill of Ane

- Location in province of Overijssel in the Netherlands Ane (Netherlands)
- Coordinates: 52°36′48″N 6°39′3″E
- Country: Netherlands
- Province: Overijssel
- Municipality: Hardenberg

Area
  - Total: 8.54 km^{2} (3.30 sq mi)
- Elevation: 10 m (33 ft)

Population (2021)
  - Total: 560
  - Density: 66/km^{2} (170/sq mi)
- Time zone: UTC+1 (CET)
  - Summer (DST): UTC+2 (CEST)
- Postal code: 7784
- Dialing code: 0524

Ane (Dutch Low Saxon: Aone) is a village in the Dutch province of Overijssel. It is located in the municipality Hardenberg, about 5 km northeast of the centre of Hardenberg.

In 1227, the Battle of Ane was fought during which the bishop of Utrecht was defeated by the citizens of Drenthe. In 1840, it was home to 358 people. In 1864, the gristmill Anermolen was built. It was restored in 1981.
