= Nieuwleusen =

- Town
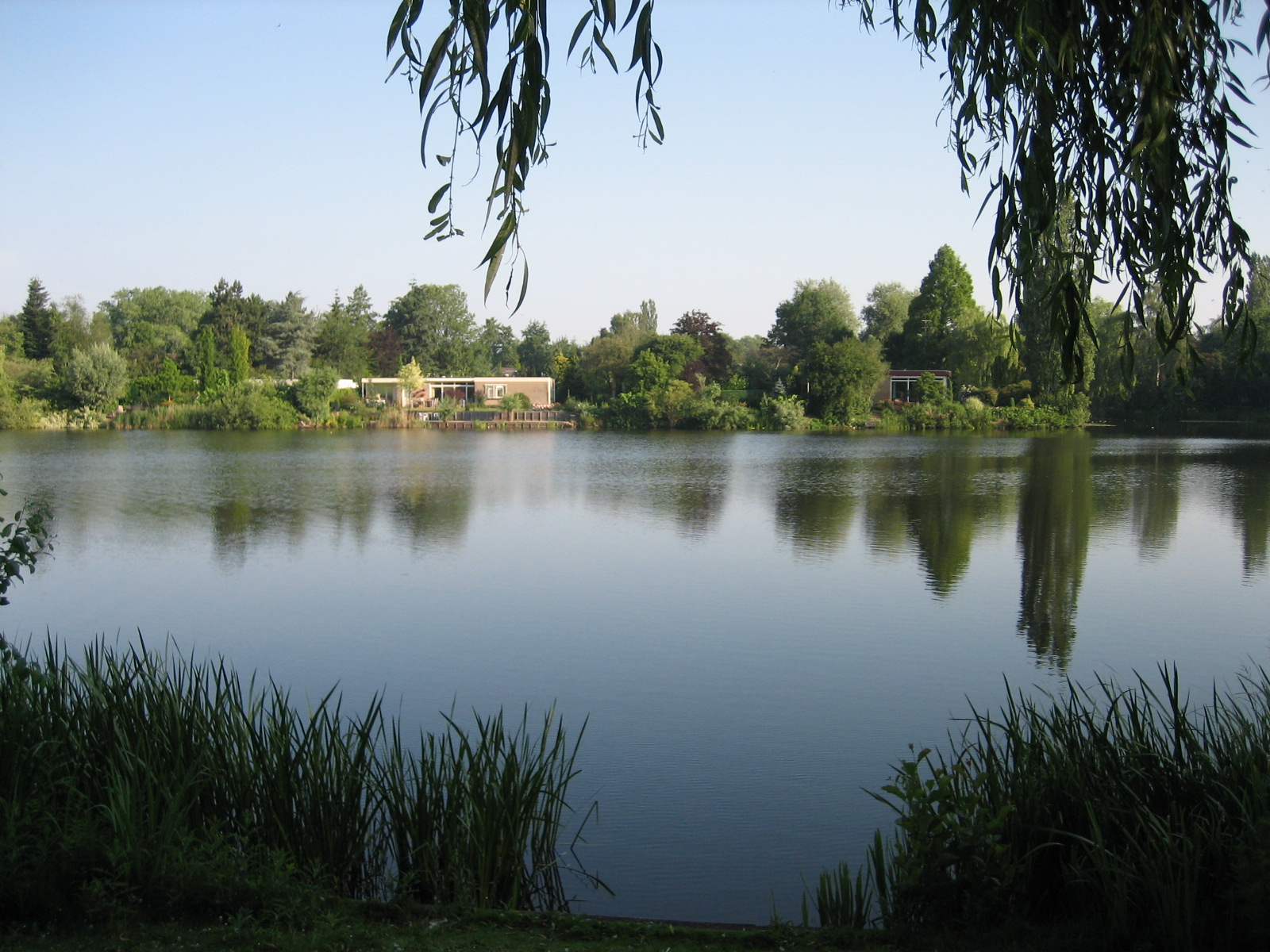
- The Old Hulsterplas in Nieuwleusen

- Flag Coat of arms

- Location in the Netherlands Nieuwleusen (Netherlands)
- Coordinates: 52°35′0″N 6°17′0″E
- Country: Netherlands
- Province: Overijssel
- Municipality: Dalfsen

Area
  - Total: 27.94 km^{2} (10.79 sq mi)
- Elevation: 3.1 m (10 ft)

Population (2021)
  - Total: 9,300
  - Density: 330/km^{2} (860/sq mi)
- Time zone: UTC+1 (CET)
  - Summer (DST): UTC+2 (CEST)
- Postal code: 7711
- Dialing code: 0529
- Major roads: N377 en N758

Nieuwleusen (Low Saxon: Ni'jlusen) is a town in the Dutch province of Overijssel with 9300 inhabitants as of 2021. In the 2001 municipal reform, most of the former municipality of Nieuwleusen was incorporated into the municipality of Dalfsen. Some parts of the former municipality, including the Lichtmis area, was added to the neighbouring municipality of Zwolle.

== Situation ==
The provincial road N377 (the 'Den Hulst') runs along the town, going from Hasselt in the west to Coevorden in the east. To the north are the hamlet of Punthorst and the Staatsbos state woodland in the municipality of Staphorst. South of Nieuwleusen is Dalfsen, a slightly bigger town from which the municipality takes its name. To the west, provincial road N377 and highway A28 meet at De Lichtmis, the location of a former military bulwark which provided access to the north of the country. Nieuwleusen is situated between the Vecht and Reest rivers to the south and north respectively, and is counted as part of the historical region of Salland, or latterly the (Overijssels) Vechtdal (Vecht Valley - a usage in tourism).

The town has a northern and an older southern half (today called Nieuwleusen-Noord and Nieuwleusen-Zuid, respectively) separated by sports fields and facilities. The northern part has the Old and New Hulsterplas, two connected recreational bodies of water created between the nineteen-sixties and -eighties. The southern part has the Kerkenhoek area with the Grote Kerk (Great Church) from 1830, first built in 1660; the former town hall; and the small Palthebos wood, once the possession of the Palthe family of clergy and landowners.

Rural cores and former hamlets that form part of Nieuwleusen include Den Hulst to the north, De Meele to the northwest and the Ruitenveen to the southwest.

New housing has been under construction for years. Construction is underway in various locations, notably to the west (the 'Westerbouwlanden').

== Accessibility ==
Public transportation to and from Nieuwleusen include bus routes 301 between Zwolle and Coevorden, 649 (a school bus) between Zwolle and Dedemsvaart and 217, all operated by Syntus Overijssel. Roads leading into Nieuwleusen include the N377 (from Hasselt), N758 (from Zwolle) and N757 (from Dalfsen).

== History ==
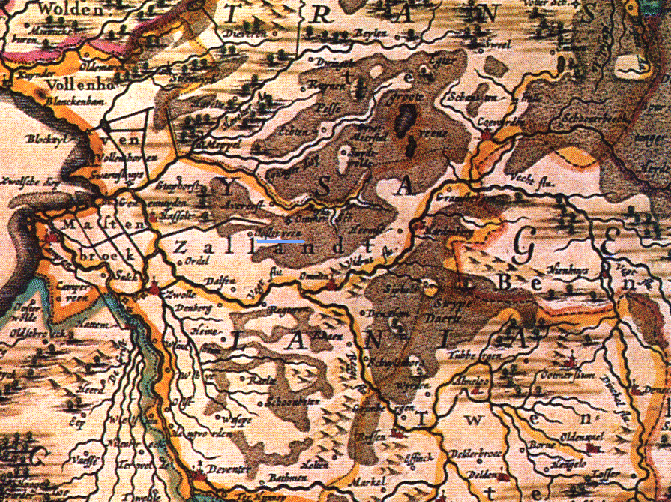
The Oosterveen, which would develop into Nieuwleusen, underlined on a map by Janssonius (1658). The dark brown areas are peat moors. Click to enhance.

Nieuwleusen came into existence in the first half of the seventeenth century. At the time, most of the area between Leusen, a village on the Vecht, and the Reest on the border with the province of Drenthe consisted of inaccessible peat moors. The entire area of the Vechtdal, from Hasselt to Coevorden, is indicated as 't Veen (the Peat Moor) on a map by Abraham Goos from the early seventeenth century. The area where Nieuwleusen now lies is called the Ommer moer (Moor of Ommen) on the same map.

=== The Luessener Compagnie ===
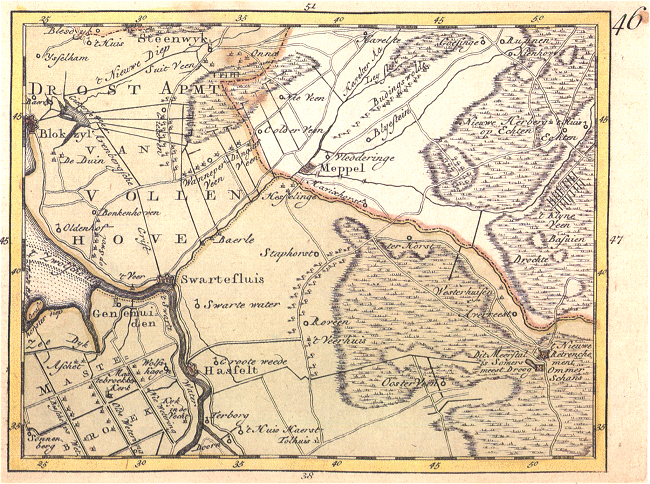
The 'OosterVeen' in 1773. The line above it is the Beentjesgraven stream, followed in 1809 for the trajectory of the Dedemsvaart canal. Click to enhance.

On 8 January 1631, the Luessener Compagnie was established by inhabitants of Zwolle and Kampen to cultivate the area north of Leusen, which belonged to the Marke van Leusen (the local association of land owners). It was mainly pioneers from Leusen who made the land arable. The first farms of the new settlement stood along the Pad (Path), today the Oosterveen road. Hence, Nieuwleusen got its early name of Oosterveen, as seen on the earliest area maps. Once the settlement got its name of Nieuwleusen (New Leusen), the original Leusen got to be called Oudleusen or Old Leusen (Low Saxon: Oldlusen). It is believed that leusen in these names means lo-essen, approximately 'wooded fields' - which would have been descriptive of the (Old) Leusen area and carried over into the name of Nieuwleusen.

Between 1640 and 1646, the nobleman Zweer van Haersolte built the havezathe (country house typical of Overijssel) Oosterveen here. It was demolished in 1862; a scale model is on view at the town's historical museum (see below). In 1655, a house for a schoolteacher was built on the Oosterveen. The baptismal register of Nieuwleusen was kept from 1659. The first Reformed ministers were called from Zwolle, Dalfsen and Ommen. The first minister was Reverend Van Bercum, who arrived in 1663.

=== The Dedemsvaart ===
In 1809, Nieuwleusen-born nobleman and politician Baron Willem Jan van Dedem started construction of the Dedemsvaart canal through northern Overijssel, meant to facilitate the transportation of peat, which was being dug on a large scale in this part of the Netherlands. The canal would eventually stretch from the Zwarte Water in Hasselt to the Vecht at Gramsbergen, cutting horizontally through the north of the province. In 1811, the canal went as far as Balkbrug (past Nieuwleusen). Just north of Nieuwleusen, as at other points where there were locks and bridges, the Dedemsvaart stimulated settlement alongside the canal. It encouraged the growth of the hamlet of Den Hulst (known locally as Nulst), first mentioned in the early eighteenth century. From Den Hulst, the Ommerdiek road (now the main road Burg. J.P. Backxlaan) led down to Nieuwleusen. Den Hulst would evolve into the northern part of Nieuwleusen. A track for a tram engine was laid alongside the Dedemsvaart in 1885; the tram engine was run by the Dedemsvaartsche Stoomtramweg Maatschappij until cars and bus services made it obsolete. The canal having lost its economic importance by the mid-twentieth century, parts of it were drained, including (in 1969) the part that ran through Den Hulst. At the height of De Meele to the west, the Dedemsvaart still exists, as it does in other parts of the province. Provincial road N377 was constructed on the site of the canal and alongside the preserved parts.

=== The municipality of Nieuwleusen ===
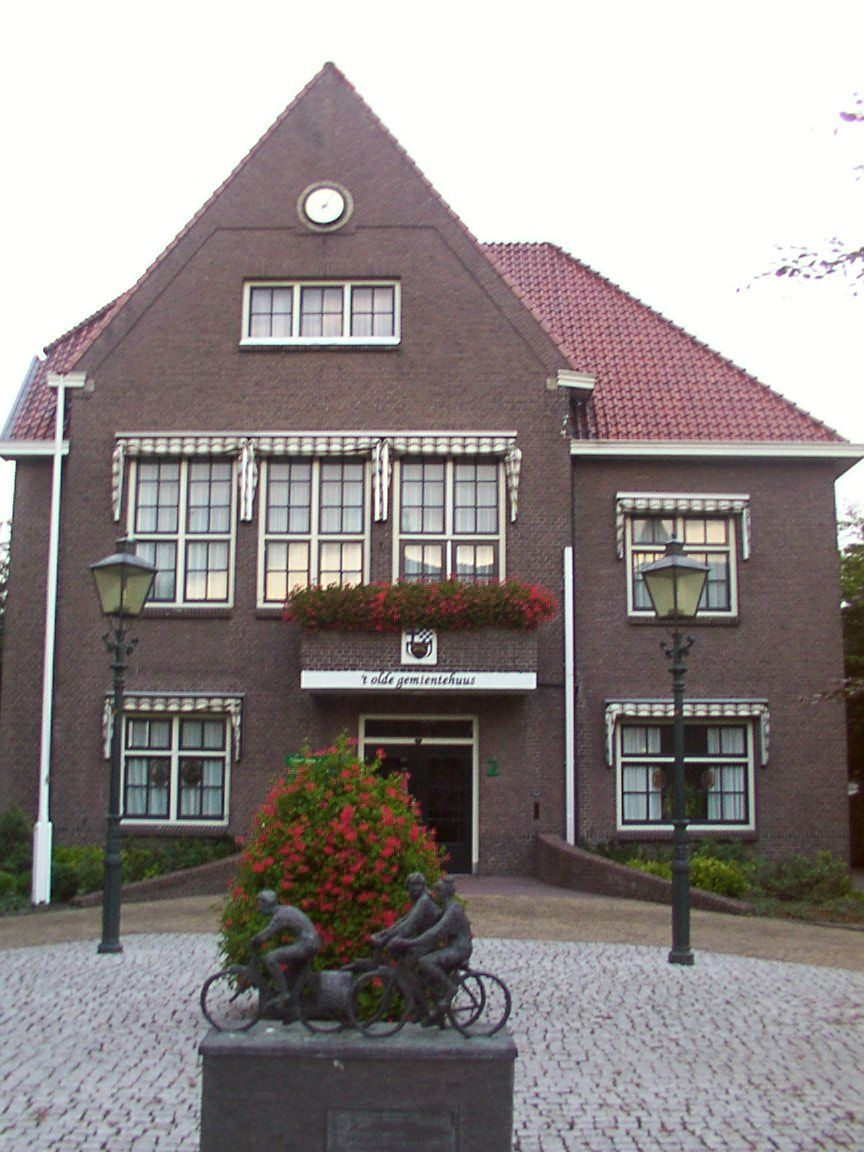
The former town hall of Nieuwleusen. The statuette in the foreground attests to the importance of bicycle manufacturing for the town's economy in the twentieth century

At the start of the eighteenth century, Nieuwleusen formed a single municipality with the hamlet of Avereest. On 1 July 1818, the municipal budgets were separated and Nieuwleusen became an independent municipality. However, it was in a 'personal union' with Avereest until 1833, sharing a mayor. Nieuwleusen had no municipal coat of arms until 1899. Like many municipalities, it applied for one in that year on the occasion of the construction of a new meeting hall for the Provincial States of Overijssel. The coat of arms was designed on the basis of those of Dalfsen (because the Marke van Leusen had been part of the legal district of Dalfsen) and the then municipality of Zwollekerspel (because part of Zwollekerspel had been incorporated into the municipality of Nieuwleusen). The crossed scythes in the lower part of the coat of arms symbolise agriculture. In 1954, Nieuwleusen applied for and was granted a crown atop its coat of arms. The municipality existed until 31 December 2000. The former municipal coat of arms is now the official 'town coat of arms'.

=== De Rollecate ===
In 1913, the first state college for female teachers of husbandry and housekeeping, called De Rollecate, was opened in Den Hulst. Baron Van Dedem had made his country estate of the same name available to this end. The house De Rollecate, where the courses were taught, had been built around 1654–1655 in Vollenhove, and dismantled in 1821 by Van Dedem to be rebuilt on the bank of his Dedemsvaart canal. The college was run by Ms Theda Mansholt and later by Ms Greta Smit. Rural women, prospective teachers, were trained in housekeeping, farming and market gardening. In 1930, the college moved to Deventer and the house was demolished.

=== Union ===
A bicycle factory called Union was set up in Den Hulst in 1904. The factory, which went on to produce famous Dutch bicycles throughout the twentieth century, was an important factor of employment in Nieuwleusen. In 1979, the old Union building was lost in a fire, the cause of which was never established. The factory was in persistent financial and managerial trouble in the last decades of its existence. Union was bankrupted in 2001, was placed in receivership with Larcom from Ommen and was sold in 2005 to Dutch Bicycle Group from Schiedam. Some production remains in Nieuwleusen. Various companies are now housed in the former factory building.

== Industry ==
Notwithstanding Union's demise, Nieuwleusen remains industrially active because of the town's favourable location close to Zwolle. There are growing industrial zones (De Meele, De Evenboer, De Rollecate, De Grift).

Shops are concentrated in the northern and southern village cores, both cores organizing their own cultural and commercial activities. Both in the north and in the south, shops are concentrated around the Backxlaan. A new square lined by combined shopping and residential units was created alongside the Backxlaan in the south in 2007. A small market is held every Saturday and moves between the north and the south every half year.

== Culture ==
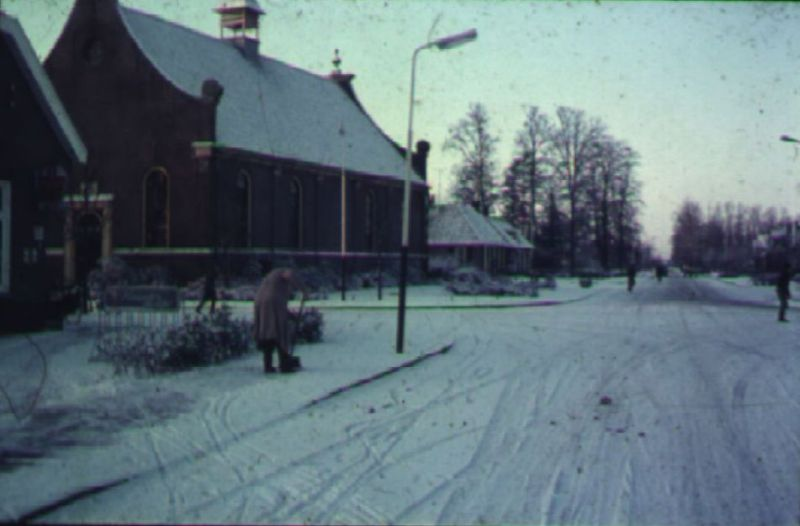
Winter scene in Nieuwleusen, with the Grote Kerk (Great Church)

In 1982, Nieuwleusen celebrated its 350th anniversary, and the Historische Vereniging Ni'jluusn van vrogger (Historical Association Nieuwleusen of Old) was founded. This association opened the Palthehof Museum of local history in 1998, which features permanent and temporary exhibitions about aspects of the town's past.

The Grammofoonmuseum (Gramophone Museum) has gramophones on display from early models to more recent ones.

The Christian marching band De Broederband was founded in 1925, and there is a Christian male choir, the Hazeuzangers.

The last surviving of six windmills in Nieuwleusen, Massier's mill from 1861, is located on Westeinde road. Having fallen into disrepair, it was restored to milling capacity in 2007-08 and opened for public activities.

Nieuwleusen has a number of primary schools as well as a school for secondary education.

The town is twinned with St Albans, England, and Hörstel, Germany.

== Sports ==
Nieuwleusen has a cluster of outdoor and indoor sports facilities which separate the northern and southern halves of the town. It includes football pitches, tennis courts, korfball pitches, a skating rink and an outdoor swimming pool. There are many sports clubs, including two football clubs (USV Nieuwleusen and SV Nieuwleusen), an association for shooting sports and a motorcycle club. According to the Dalfsen council, Nieuwleusen has the highest percentage of motorcycle owners in the Netherlands.

== Language ==
The dialect of Nieuwleusen is a variety of Low Saxon. Several dialect maps represent Nieuwleusen as being partly or wholly within the Zuud-Drèents dialectal area. The town lying in Overijssel rather than in the bordering province of Drenthe, however, its dialect (traditionally called simply Ni'jlusens or plat) is often seen as Sallaans rather than Drents. The dialect singer Aalt Westerman from Nieuwleusen, for instance, is billed as 'the troubadour of the Sallaans language'.

The dialect researcher Harrie Scholtmeijer has recently classed the Nieuwleusen dialect as neither Drèents nor Sallaans, but 'North Overijssels'. His categorisation, however, demarcates the main dialect groups within the province of Overijssel and does not examine dialectal continuity across provincial borders. Scholtmeijer supports the view that the Nieuwleusen dialect does not share Sallaans features such as an umlaut in diminutives, or short or drawn-out vowels in certain words that have long vowels in North Overijssels (as in Southwest-South Drèents). The late dialect researcher Hendrik Entjes, who spent the latter part of his life living in Nieuwleusen, has suggested that there is, or used to be, no single Nieuwleusen dialect and that features from both Drèents and Sallaans are found:

- "[Nieuwleusen] has an old part, in the south, and a new part which came into existence when the Dedemsvaart was dug. The new part used to be called De Hulst. There were old farms on sandy plateaus which rose above the peat. But De Hulst never developed into a proper peat colony. Now, in the past I have made RND [Dutch Dialect Atlases] recordings. One in Nieuwleusen and one in De Hulst. But now that I compare the two, I notice that my informants in De Hulst were from those older farms. When, by contrast, I go to the people who are descended from those peat workers, from the time when the Dedemsvaart was dug, there is a clear difference in dialect. Here they express this by saying: the north and the south do speak a bit differently. But what they mean is: the descendants of the old inhabitants speak a bit differently from the descendants of those who came later. [...] The old Vecht river area, for instance, says etten [to eat], but in the peat colonies one finds eten. I think this comes from Drente. And I am trying to find traces of that colonial language. One might then say that there is a peat colony dialect in Overijssel."

In accordance with a countrywide trend, the use of the dialect is dwindling in favour of Standard Dutch, and where it continues to be used it is increasingly influenced by the standard language. The dialect is used marginally in publications, for instance in the magazine of the Historical Association Ni'jluusn van vrogger. Some of its vocabulary and expressions have been mapped (for instance, see Schoemaker-Ytsma in the Bibliography).

=== Language sample ===
Zo kwamp Klaos dan met zien negotie bij een gezin waor ak de name niet van numen wille. De vrouw begun der over: "Klaos, wat ek eheurd. Heb ie onlangs bij Griete eslaopen? Wat muk dor nou van denken?" Klaos had zien antwoord niet klaor. Wat mus hij daor nou op zeggen? Mar hij kreeg hulpe. Er ging een schip deur de Dedemsvaort en het mag dan wel toevallig wezen, mar opiens zei Klaos tegen de vrouwe: "Dreit oe ies umme en leest ies wat op det schip stiet". Het mense kreeg een kleur tot achter de oren, want zij lezen de woorden: "ZIET OP U ZELVEN".

Standard Dutch translation:
Zo kwam Klaas dan met zijn handelswaar bij een gezin waar ik de naam niet van wil noemen. De vrouw begon erover: "Klaas, wat heb ik gehoord. Heb jij onlangs bij Greet geslapen? Wat moet ik daar nou van denken?" Klaas had zijn antwoord niet gereed. Wat moest hij daar nou op zeggen? Maar hij kreeg hulp. Er ging een schip door de Dedemsvaart en het mag dan wel toevallig zijn, maar ineens zei Klaas tegen de vrouw: "Draai je eens om en lees eens wat er op dat schip staat". Het mens kreeg een kleur tot achter de oren, want zij las de woorden: "ZIET OP U ZELVEN".

English translation:
Klaos, then, took his merchandise to a family I wish to remain unnamed. The wife broached the subject: "Klaos, what have they told me. Did you sleep with Griete the other day? What am I supposed to make of that?" Klaos did not have a ready answer. What to say to this? But he got unexpected assistance. A ship passed through the Dedemsvaart, and it may be a big coincidence, but Klaos suddenly told the woman: "Turn around and have a look at what it says on that ship". The woman turned crimson, for she read the words: "LOOK UPON THYSELF".

From 'Olde Kloas' by Berend van Duren, in Gees Bartels-Martens (1997), Een rondje Nieuwleusen. Een bescheiden rondgang door de literatuur en geschiedenis van Nieuwleusen, Kampen: IJsselacademie

== People of note ==
This list includes notable people who live(d) in Nieuwleusen.

- Willem Jan van Dedem (1776–1851), sponsor of the Dedemsvaart canal
- Manon Flier (born 1984), volleyball player in the national team
- Korie Homan (born 1986), wheelchair tennis player
- Tjako van Schie (born 1961), pianist and composer

== Bibliography ==
This list contains books about Nieuwleusen.

- Bartels-Martens, Gees (1997), Een rondje Nieuwleusen: Een bescheiden rondgang door de literatuur en geschiedenis van Nieuwleusen, Kampen: IJsselacademie
- Brouwer, Hanneke (1975), De gemeente Nieuwleusen; een morfologische studie, Amsterdam: Vrije Universiteit Amsterdam
- Hengeveld-van Berkum, G., G. Kreule-Kok & J.W. de Weerd (samenstelling) (1992), Boerderijen toen, en nu..., Nieuwleusen: Ni'jluusn van vrogger
- Hille, H. & Th. Postma (1986), Afgescheidenen in een Overijssels dorp; anderhalve eeuw gereformeerden in Nieuwleusen
- Koman, Ruben A. (2006), Dalfser Muggen: Volksverhalen uit een Overijsselse gemeente. Mondelinge overlevering, volksgeloof en vertelcultuur in Dalfsen, Hoonhorst, Lemelerveld, Nieuwleusen, Oudleusen e.o., Bedum: Profiel Uitgeverij (in collaboration with IJsselacademie, Kampen)
- Meijerink, H.J. & E.H. Mulder (1971), Nieuwleusen in oude ansichten, Zaltbommel: Europese Bibliotheek
- Meijerink, H.J. (1974), Kent u ze nog... de Nieuwleusenaren, Zaltbommel: Europese Bibliotheek
- Middag, Henk (1988), Deelgebiedsbeschrijving van de gemeente Nieuwleusen, Groningen: Rijksuniversiteit Groningen
- Pereboom, Freek & Marian Pereboom (1982), Nieuwleusen in de kaart gekeken, Kampen: IJsselacademie
- Schoemaker-Ytsma, A.C.M. (2006), "Zo zegge wi'j det" van A tot Z! Woorden en gezegdes in het dialect van Nieuwleusen, Nieuwleusen: The Readshop J. Hilbrink
- Steege, J. ter (1982), De kerke tot Oosterveen; Geschiedenis van de Hervormde gemeente Nieuwleusen, Dedemsvaart: In de Roos
- Steege, J. ter & A.C. ter Steege-Boeren (1982), Nieuwleusen in oude ansichten deel 2, Zaltbommel: Europese Bibliotheek
- Steege, J. ter & A.C. ter Steege-Boeren (1985), Kent u ze nog... de Nieuwleusenaren deel 2, Zaltbommel: Europese Bibliotheek
- Sterken Rzn, H. (1976), Ni'j luusen mien dörpien, Nieuwleusen: private publication
- Varwijk, G.H. (Ed.) (1998), De Dedemsvaart, zijn stad, streek en dorpen, Dedemsvaart: Boekhandel Rooseboom
- Visscher, Wim (2005), Heeren van de Ligtmis: Geschiedenis van de Leusener Compagnie, het begin van Nieuwleusen en het Oosterveen, Gouda: H&K Uitgevers
- Weerd, Jakob de (Ed.) (2007), Fotoboek Nieuwleusen, Nieuwleusen: Ni'jluusn van vrogger
