= Den Hulst =

Coordinates: 52°36′N 6°17′E

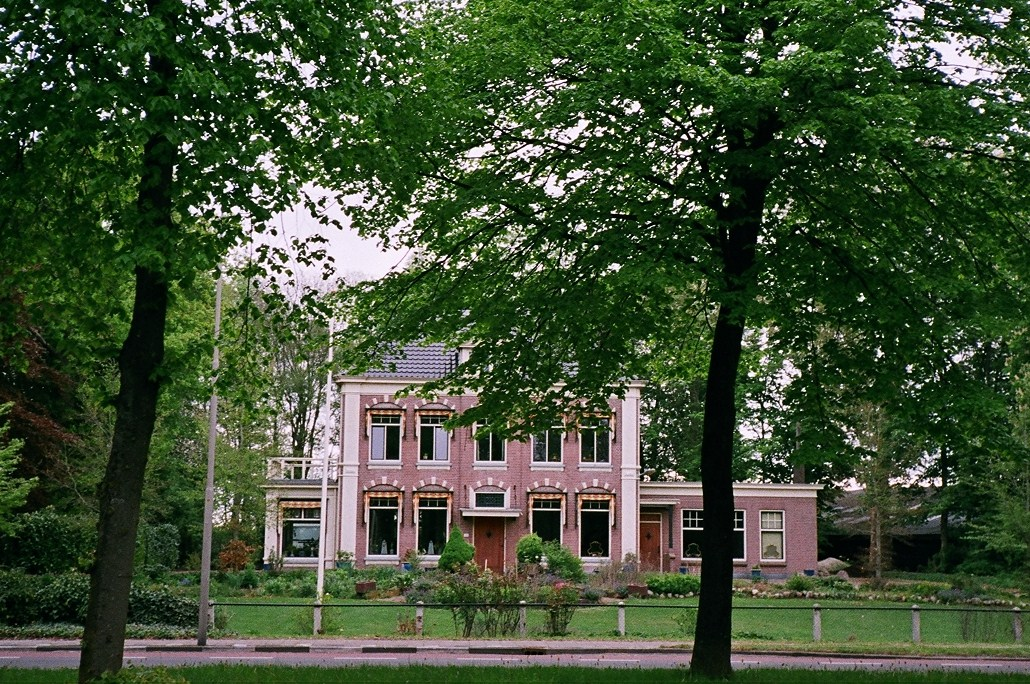
Mansion in Den Hulst

Den Hulst, can be spelled at times as De Hulst and traditionally pronounced as Nulst locally is a historical Dutch hamlet which was incorporated into the village and municipality of Nieuwleusen (today in the municipality of Dalfsen). The northern part of Nieuwleusen is known as Den Hulst to this day.

== Location ==
Den Hulst is located in the central north of the province of Overijssel. It is a built-up stretch along the provincial motorway N377, itself called de Den Hulst where it traverses the locality. The locality predates the motorway, which was constructed along the trajectory of the former Dedemsvaart canal (parts of which still exist).

Immediately north of Den Hulst is the municipality of Staphorst, nearby to which are the Staphorst woods. Hulsterplas Lake, dug south of the Dedemsvaart when the canal was filled in, is part of Den Hulst, as is the northern end of Burgemeester Backxlaan, the street that connects it with the historical core of Nieuwleusen. West of Den Hulst, at the junction of the N377 and the A28 motorway, is De Lichtmis, the location of a historical sconce and today a hub of roadside facilities including a motel and restaurants.

== Early history and the Dedemsvaart ==
References from the early 18th century make mention of "in Den Hulst, that is, at the Canal" and "at the Canal in the Oosterhulst". The canal in question is not the Dedemsvaart, which was started in 1809, but the earlier and smaller Beentjesgraven, a drainage channel a bit further north which still exists. The Oosterhulst is the present-day name for a stretch of the N377 motorway east of Den Hulst.

In the first half of the 19th century the Dedemsvaart canal was constructed to transport peat on an east–west axis, from the moors in the eastern Netherlands to the more urban west, where the peat was burnt for fuel. The canal, which ran from Hasselt in the west to Gramsbergen in the east, had eight locks. Hamlets and towns grew up around the canal's locks and bridges. Den Hulst, which had twelve houses when the canal reached it, developed economic activity around the Dedemsvaart. Peat transporters who accompanied horse-drawn barges frequented cafés along the towpaths; Rijkman Wicherson's café in Den Hulst was one such establishment.

The Dedemsvaart's patron, Willem Jan baron Van Dedem, wrote about his canal:

"As early as the autumn of that year [1809, when construction was begun at Hasselt] the stretch to the Ligtmis inn was almost finished. A channel was dug as far as the hamlet of de Hulst and in 1811 the canal was navigable up to the Oosterhuizer field [some 7 km east of Den Hulst], a distance of about five hours on foot from Hasselt."

Den Hulst was located at lock number three and the Ommerdieker bridge. People living in Den Hulst were said to be living "an de vaort" (along the canal), just like residents of the town of Dedemsvaart which sprung up to the east. The south side of Den Hulst was called the "zaandkaante", the sand side, because of the sand towpath. Traffic grew, and at the end of the 19th century a tram track was laid along the canal between De Lichtmis and Lutten. The steam tram took people from Den Hulst to the city of Zwolle until it became an antiquated form of long-distance transportation, when the tracks were removed.

Den Hulst gradually merged with the settlement of Nieuwleusen to the south, which had its origin in peat cutting and agricultural activity.

== De Rollecate ==
In 1913, a state college was founded in Den Hulst to train teachers in girls' education (specifically, landbouwhuishoud education, where rural women were trained in housekeeping, agricultural and horticultural tasks). The school was called Rollecate after baron Van Dedem's estate of that name, which he had made available to enable the founding of the college. Rollecate mansion had been built in Vollenhove around 1654-55 and Van Dedem had moved it to Den Hulst in 1821, where he had a view of his canal. The school was led by pedagogue Theda Mansholt and later by Greta Smit. In 1930, the college moved to Deventer, and the mansion was torn down.

== Union ==
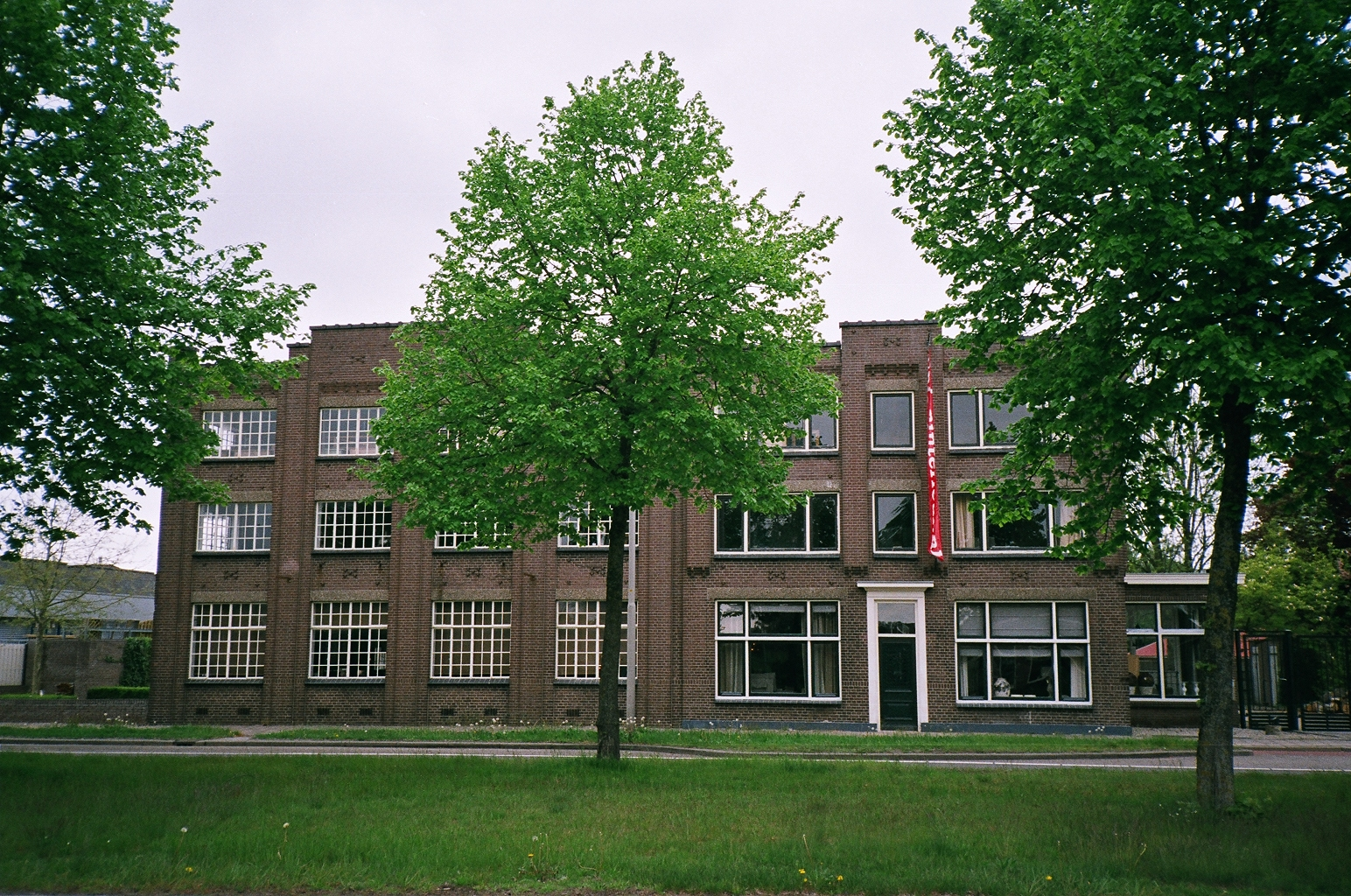
A building of the former Union bicycle manufacturing plant in Den Hulst

In 1904, the Van den Berg brothers opened the Union bicycle manufacturing plant in Den Hulst. The company also included building materials and lumber plants and eventually branched into mopeds. It fast became Nieuwleusen's biggest employer. In its early years, Union printed "on the Dedemsvaart" or simply "Dedemsvaart" on its publicity material because people were more likely to be familiar with the canal than with the settlement of Den Hulst; this caused some to link the factory with the town of Dedemsvaart east of Den Hulst.

From the mid-70s on, Union was plagued by mismanagement and conflicts between managers and employees. The old Union factory building was consumed by fire in 1979 in circumstances that were never cleared up. The company went bankrupt in 2001 and was placed in the curatorship of social enterprise Larcom in Ommen. Union ceased to exist as a company when it was sold to the Dutch Bicycle Group in Schiedam in 2005. The former Union premises are now used by several companies. Another large fire destroyed most of Union's former buildings in 2009.

== End of the Dedemsvaart canal ==
After World War II, the Dedemsvaart canal lost its economic significance due to the rise in motorised land transportation. The 1960s saw large tracts filled and replaced with motorways, and in 1969, the Den Hulst canal was filled, although a tract just to the west in the neighbouring hamlet of De Meele is still open. As a result of the canal's disappearance, Den Hulst is now essentially a row of houses, farm houses and companies on either side of the motorway. The sand used for filling in the canal was obtained by excavating farmland just south of it, which was then converted into a small lake, the Hulsterplas.

== Nieuwleusen-Noord ==
In the course of its integration into Nieuwleusen, Den Hulst came to be called Nieuwleusen-noord or noord (north), whereas the southern part of Nieuwleusen is called zuid (south). The Ommerdiek road that ran from north to south was rebaptised Burgemeester Backxlaan. The northern and southern parts of the village are today separated by sports fields and sports facilities. Both north and south have a concentration of retailers who organize separate cultural and commercial activities. A small market is held every Saturday and moves between north and south every half year.

The name of the hamlet of Den Hulst is reflected in such names as Hulstkampenweg and Hulsterpad roads and retirement home de Hulstkampen.
