= Daniel Koerhuis =

Dutch politician (born 1981)

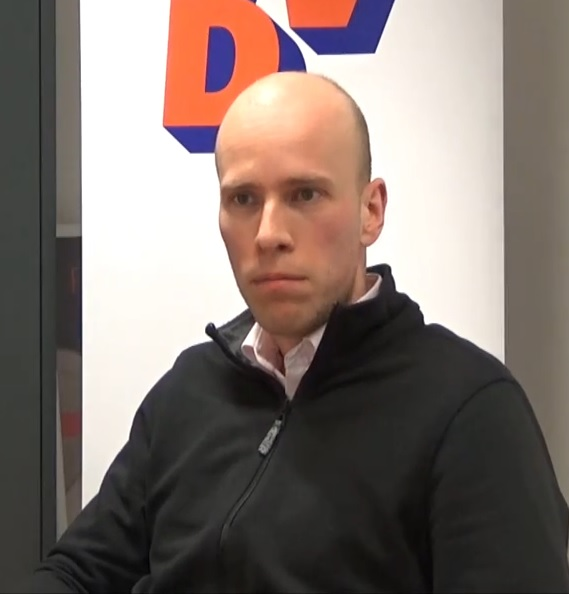
Daniel Koerhuis, 2017

Daniel Antonius Nikola Koerhuis (born 26 July 1981 in Dedemsvaart) is a Dutch politician, who served as a Member of Parliament for the People's Party for Freedom and Democracy (VVD, Volkspartij voor Vrijheid en Democratie) between 23 March 2017 and 2023.

== Electoral history ==
Electoral history of Daniël Koerhuis
Year	Body	Party	Pos.	Votes	Result		Ref.
Year	Body	Party	Pos.	Votes	Party seats	Individual	Ref.
2021	House of Representatives	People's Party for Freedom and Democracy	19	2,194	34	Won	
