= Martin Koster =

Dutch writer in Low Saxon

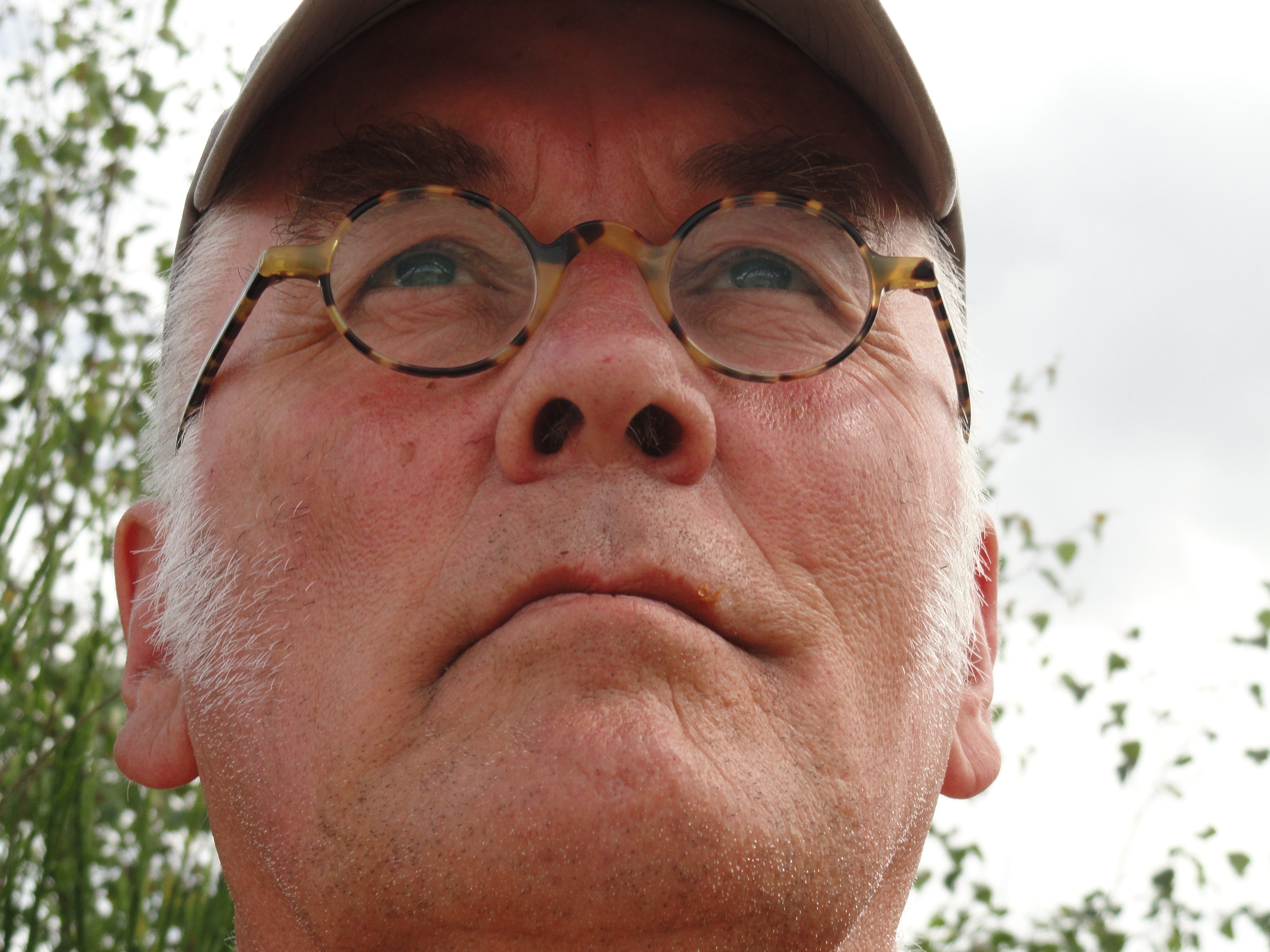
- Martin Koster in 2012
- Born: Martin Gert Koster; 1950 (age 75–76); Dedemsvaart, Overijssel, Netherlands
- Occupations: teacher, writer

Martin Gert Koster (Dedemsvaart, Netherlands, 1950) is a Dutch writer in the Drèents variety of Dutch Low Saxon. Known for his parodies and sarcasm, he is one of the founders of Drèents literary magazine Roet, which sought to broaden the literary appeal of Drèents writing by teasing it away from a focus on nostalgia and trodden paths. In 2021 Koster received a knighthood in the Order of Orange-Nassau for his efforts on behalf of the Drèents language.

== Youth and employment as teacher ==
Koster's family on his father's side had lived between the river Reest and the Dedemsvaart canal since the 19th century. His mother's family left the Kingdom of Hannover in the 19th century as asylum seekers, establishing themselves in Roswinkel in the province of Drenthe. Koster himself grew up in the village of Dedemsvaart, in the house from which his parents ran a grocery shop.

The first six years of his life, he spoke "nothing but the finest Drèents there is: Riestdrèents or south-west Drèents". He attended higher secondary education in Zwolle; at age eighteen he and his parents moved to nearby Hoogeveen. In 1970 Koster took up a study of Dutch at the University of Groningen, where he was qualified as a teacher of Dutch in secondary schools. The university's Low Saxon Institute, where his teachers included professor of Low Saxon Hendrik Entjes, instilled a fondness in him for regional language and literature in it.

Between 1976 and 1981, Koster was a teacher at Assen, Deventer and Stadskanaal. He was a guest teacher of Drèents at the teachers' college in Meppel. He was a publican for a stint in Nee. In Leek in 2000, he took up a position teaching Dutch to non-native speakers. He has also run a liquor store, been a public transport driver and worked as a shepherd. Today he lives in Lieveren.

== Writing and teaching in Low Saxon ==
Koster's poems and sketches, which have by and large appeared in Roet magazine, were published under a plethora of playful pen names, including the prominent one Meine Roswinkel. He has published under his own name since 1995. Themes in his work include death, loneliness, marginal figures, the precarious position of Low Saxon, and the difficult relationship between men and women. He has frequently parodied the work of other Drèents writers, such as Marga Kool, Roel Reijntjes and Peter van der Velde.

Koster was a coordinator of teaching methods of several varieties of Drèents and helped compile a Drèents spelling and literature course for local radio station Radio Noord. He has written newspaper columns for the Provinciale Drentsche en Asser Krant, Nieuwsblad van het Noorden and, from 2015 to 2020, Dagblad van het Noorden. He also corrected and edited many Drèents-language publications.

With fellow Drèents writer Anne Doornbos, Koster founded the 'Nei Drèents Geneutschap' in 2005, a society which gave awards to people and organizations for doing the Drèents language a good turn. Conversely, the society gave ironic awards to those who it believed had done the language a disservice.

== Founding of Roet ==
In a pub in Groningen in 1979, Koster suggested creating a literary magazine in Drèents. His fellow student, Ton Kolkman from Twente, was instantly enthused. That same day they wrote the first issue of Roet (Drèents for garden weeds). From its improvised beginnings, the magazine went on to become one of the house publications of the Drèents emancipation institute Huus van de Taol. It profiled itself as antagonistic towards stiflingly old-fashioned, conservative and untalented writing. The time of siep, schaop en scheuper (sheep dog, sheep and shepherd), proclaimed the editors, was over. Shortly before starting Roet, Koster had been an editor of De Pennevogel (appearing between 1974–1979) which, on a similar tack as its predecessor 't Swieniegeltje, had included work in several varieties of Low Saxon from the Netherlands and Germany.

As distinct from the older Drèents publication Oeze Volk, Roet published controversially themed pieces on subjects such as homosexuality, which was a first within the world of Drèents writing. Initially publishing only Drèents, it later adapted its policy and included work in Dutch and other languages as well. Koster was an editor of Roet for twenty years. In 2004 he published an anthology from 25 years of Roet entitled Strèupers van de taol: 25 jaor Roet (Poachers of the language: 25 years of Roet).

== Koster and the Drentse Schrieverskring ==
Koster was a member of the Drentse Schrieverskring, a society of Drèents writers founded in 1953. He started to vent his opinion that the society included many members who were not interested in literature. Some members wanted to see him expelled on the basis of his writings, but under the patronage of the society's president Klaas Kleine he was appointed to the board in 1991.

When discord arose in 1992 because a number of members did not want writer and politician Lukas Koops to become president, Koster supported Koops. Citing a ban placed on himself to talk critically about members, Koster subsequently left the Schrieverskring.

== Publications by and about Koster ==
Many of Koster's short pieces, not always published under his own name, have not been collected. In 1995, Het Drentse Boek published his semi-autobiographical account Zölfportret mit sparzegelties (Self-portrait with Spar savings coupons), vignettes largely of his childhood and student life. He made the first Drèents translation of a comic, the Spike and Suzy album Het hondeparadies (The dog paradise), published in 1998. In the same year he published the Dutch-language monograph Tegen de stroom in. Het kunstenaarschap van Rudi Seidel (Against the grain. Rudi Seidel's life as an artist).

The collection Hotel an 't spoor (Hotel along the railroad) brought together Koster's poems of the preceding thirty years (Het Drentse Boek, 2010). It won the 2011 Dagblad van het Noorden regional language prize in the prose and poetry category. The volume includes his oft-quoted short poem Requiem veur een hunebed of Petrae in de vrömde, which takes an ironic swipe at Drenthe's famous megalithic hunebeds.

In 2017 Het Drentse Boek published Koster's Oostwaartsch! Grensverkennings van een Sudentendrent, a travel account written partly in Dutch and partly in Drèents. This was followed by Ik trap hum an (Het Drentse Boek, 2020), a selection of columns Koster wrote for the daily Dagblad van het Noorden under the pen name Sjarlefrans. Also in 2020 appeared Een goed stuk vleis: Drents volkstiedschrift under the pseudonymous editorship of Lodewijk van Heiden and John Harbours (Koster and Jan Harbers).

The winter 1999/2000 issue of Roet was dedicated to Koster on the occasion of his stepping down as editor in chief. In 2006, the Drèents language institute Drentse Taol (now Huus van de Taol) released a writer's portrait about him on DVD.

== Quotes ==
- Writing in Drèents is and always will be a curious affair. And I like it that way. I like the offbeat. It's what gives life an interesting twist.
- I, Meine Roswinkel, was born along the Heufdvaort, some three kilometres south of the Riest, and with hindsight you could say I've remained a Peat Drent all my life. That's to say, I need space, I want to be able to name what I don't like, I don't want to be buried in some or other village on the sands where there is no private life, where you have to join in everything. I have zero obligations. I am my own boss.
