= Staphorster Boertje =

Dutch quack (1840-1922)

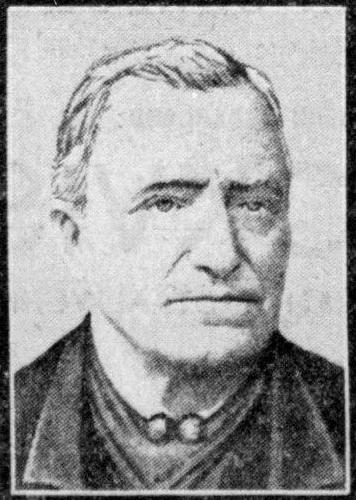
- Portrait of the Staphorster Boertje (Peter Stegeman) from 1922
- Born: Peter Stegeman; 9 October 1840; Staphorst, Netherlands
- Died: 31 January 1922 (aged 81); Staphorst, Netherlands
- Occupations: carpenter, quack
- Years active: 1890s-1922

Peter Stegeman (9 October 1840 – 31 January 1922), known professionally as the Staphorster Boertje, was a Dutch carpenter and quack doctor. In the late 19th and early 20th century, Stegeman, who possessed no medical training, achieved considerable fame as a traveling herbalist and salesman of personally prepared remedies, despite being convicted multiple times of practicing medicine without a license. After Stegeman's death in 1922, his descendants and various others continued selling his remedies under the Staphorster Boertje name, the last of whom died in 2020.

== Biography ==
Peter Stegeman was born on 9 October 1840 in Staphorst. According to Stegeman, his family was of German descent, and its members, including his grandfather and great-grandfather, had practiced medicine since at least 1611. He was initially employed as a carpenter in Staphorst, and from 1900 he was officially listed in government registries as being employed as a farmer. Stegeman's adopted persona of the "Staphorster Boertje" (literally translated as the Little Farmer from Staphorst) may have been a reference to this listed profession, though a lawyer who supported Stegeman claimed it was instead a reference to the famous Dutch doctor Herman Boerhaave.

Stegeman reportedly began practicing as a herbalist around 1870. He had no medical training, according to him he had been taught by his uncle, who had also been a herbal doctor. He owned a library of books containing knowledge about the supposed medicinal properties of various herbs, many of which he collected in the fields around Staphorst. The first public mention of the Staphorster Boertje date from 1891, when a public prosecutor in Zwolle investigated him for practicing medicine without a license, but was unable to press charges due to the reluctance of people in Staphorst to testify against him.

In the early 1890s, the Staphorster Boertje began traveling around the Netherlands, visiting a different city every dag where he would hold public meetings with patients. The only exceptions were Thursday, when he attended to patients in Staphorst, and Sunday, when the Boertje, a faithful Christian, would remain at home and only treat "severe cases". In 1895, some of the towns which the Staphorster Boertje would regularly visit included Amsterdam, Zwolle, Steenwijk, Deventer, The Hague, Arnhem, and Heerenveen. During these meetings, patients would come up to Stegeman, silently staring at them until the patient began to explain their symptoms, after which he would start asking questions, and eventually come to a diagnosis for which various powders, drops or herbs would be prepared. Patients often noted the personal attention he paid to them. The content of the remedies could vary widely; patients with prostate issues were prescribed the exact same drops as patients with recurring headaches. A powder meant to cure deafness was made up of horsetail and centaury.

The Staphorster Boertje, who possessed no medical credentials, frequently ran afoul of an 1865 law banning the practicing of medicine without a license. In 1895 alone, he was convicted four different times, twice in Steenwijk, once in Heerenveen and another time in Zwolle. In many cases, the Staphorster Boertje refused to show up for court hearings, and when he was fined 300 guilders he had the sum paid for him by a wealthy sympathiser. Many of the court cases only served to increase the Boertje's notoriety, and when the prosecutions gradually died down his supporters saw this as an indication of the veracity of his healing abilities.

To avoid these charges, the Staphorster Boertje publicly claimed to neither conduct physical examinations nor offer any medical treatment, instead merely selling tickets to public meetings where he would only "ask questions" to attendees. In addition, he employed the services of a licensed doctor Voorman from 1900, although after Voorman's death in 1906 the Boertje continued practicing independently. The Staphorster Boertje was further convicted at least twice of charges involving the treatment of patients, once concerning the death of a 16-year-old girl under his care, and second for mistreating a patient's crooked leg.

His popularity made him a target of the Vereniging tegen de Kwakzalverij, an organisation founded in 1881 to combat medical quackery, who frequently published articles criticising him with little effect. Stegeman became very wealthy as a result of his practice as the Staphorster Boertje, building himself a new house in Staphorst and financially bailing out two of his sons at a cost of around 1.5 million euros in 2024. In 1901, former president of the South African Republic Paul Kruger personally visited Stegeman to receive treatment from him. Several imitators and impostors appeared under the name Staphorster Boertje as well, seeking to take advantage of Stegeman's popularity.

In the 20th century, media attention to the Staphorster Boertje slowed, though his practice remained widely popular.The Staphorster Boertje was last prosecuted in 1915 in Heerenveen, a case which eventually went up to the Supreme Court of the Netherlands. As late as 1920, the Staphorster Boertje was still traveling out of Staphorst every day but Thursday to treat patients, at the age of 80.

Peter Stegeman died on 31 January 1922 in Staphorst.

== Legacy ==
After Peter Stegeman's death, at least seven of his descendants, including his sons Lammert, Klaas and Jan Stegeman, as well as several grandchildren, would continue selling his remedies under the Staphorster Boertje name. In 1938, the name Staphorster Boertje was officially trademarked, The last person to use the title "Staphorster Boertje", Lubbert Slager, died in 2020.

In 2000, the Vereniging tegen de Kwakzalverij listed Stegeman as number five on its list of the most famous Dutch quacks of the twentieth century.

In 2024, journalist Wim Coster, a great-great-grandchild of Peter Stegeman, wrote a biography about him, in which he characterises the Staphorster Boertje as a figure who was not a mere quack, but possessed valuable knowledge about the medicinal properties of various plants. The book was critically panned by the Vereniging tegen de Kwakzalverij, which criticised the author's lack of knowledge and scepticism about the Staphorster Boertje's medical claims and motives.
