= Willem Jan van Dedem =

Dutch landowner

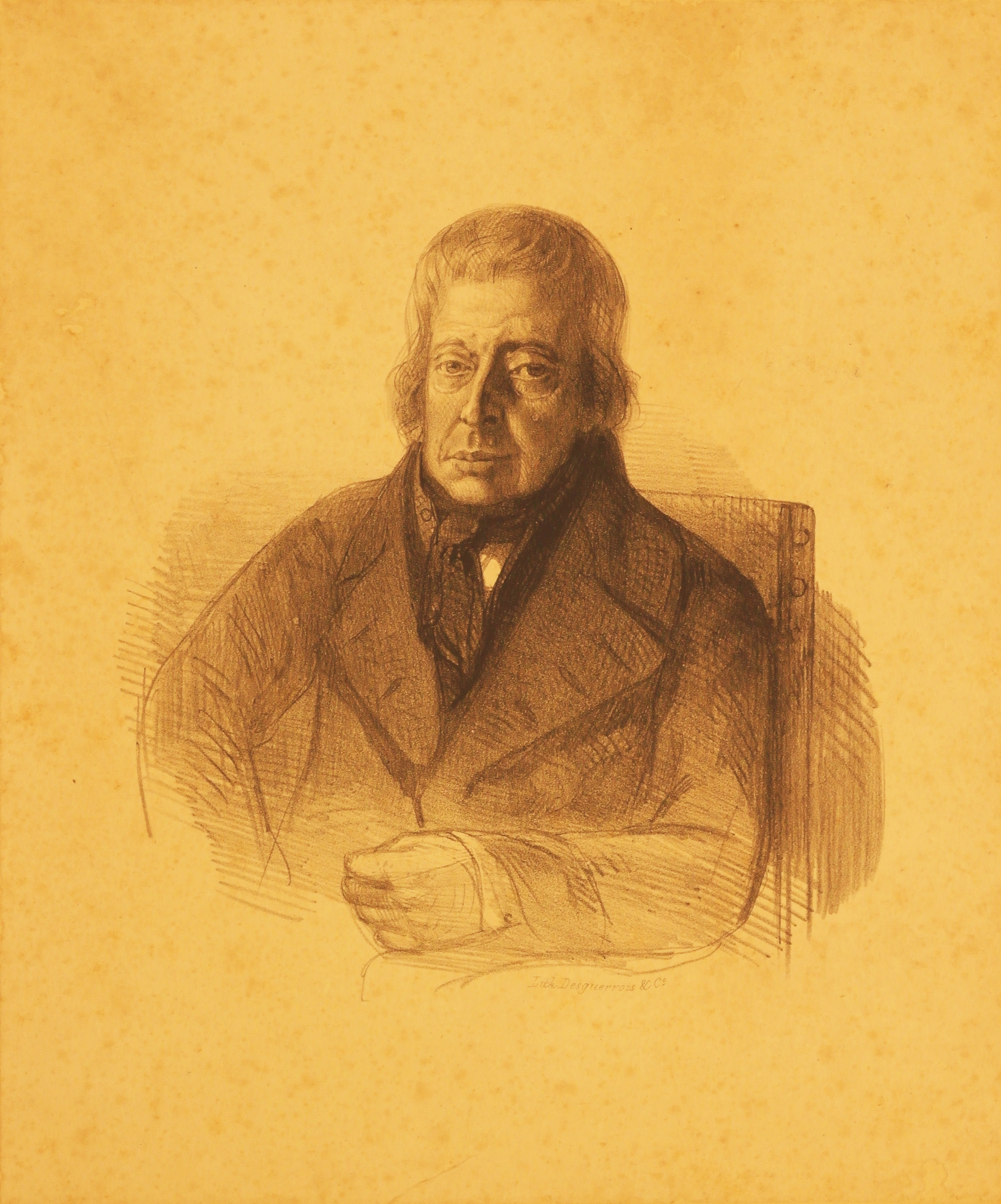
- Born: Willem Jan van Dedem tot den Bergh; 18 March 1776; Zwolle, Dutch Republic
- Died: 21 November 1851 (aged 75); Nieuwleusen, Netherlands
- Occupation(s): lawyer, landowner, taxation officer
- Known for: Dedemsvaart (town) and Dedemsvaart (canal)

Willem Jan, Baron van Dedem tot de Rollecate (18 March 1776 – 21 November 1851) was a Dutch lawyer, landowner and taxation officer who was responsible for the peat excavation in south-east Drenthe and north-east Overijssel. The canal and town of Dedemsvaart are named after van Dedem.

== Biography ==
Van Dedem was born on 18 March 1776 in Zwolle as a member of the van Dedem family. He studied law, and began his career as a lawyer in Zwolle.

Gerrit Willem van Marle, his father-in-law, had developed a plan in 1791 to excavate the peat in south-east Drenthe and north-east Overijssel by digging a canal from Hasselt to Gramsbergen. In 1809, van Dedem received permission from King Louis Bonaparte to dig the canal which became known as Dedemsvaart (Dedem's canal). The construction of the canal started in July 1809, and by 1811, it had reached Balkbrug where the raised bog was located. The same year, the town of Dedemsvaart was established.

In 1813, van Dedem was appointed Director Direct Taxation of Overijssel. On 28 August 1814, he was elevated to Baron van Dedem tot de Rollecate. In 1821, he moved his manor Rollecate in Vollenhove brick by brick to Den Hulst, Nieuwleusen in order to see his canal and land from his house. He ran into financial difficulties, and in 1825 sold large parts of land to the Dutch government. In 1845, the canal, bridges and sluices were sold to the province of Overijssel.

On 21 November 1851, van Dedem died in Rollecate, Nieuwleusen, at the age of 75.

On 21 July 1859, a monument was revealed in his honour in Dedemsvaart. The manor Rollecate was demolished in 1930 to build a main road (nowadays known as N377).

== Gallery ==
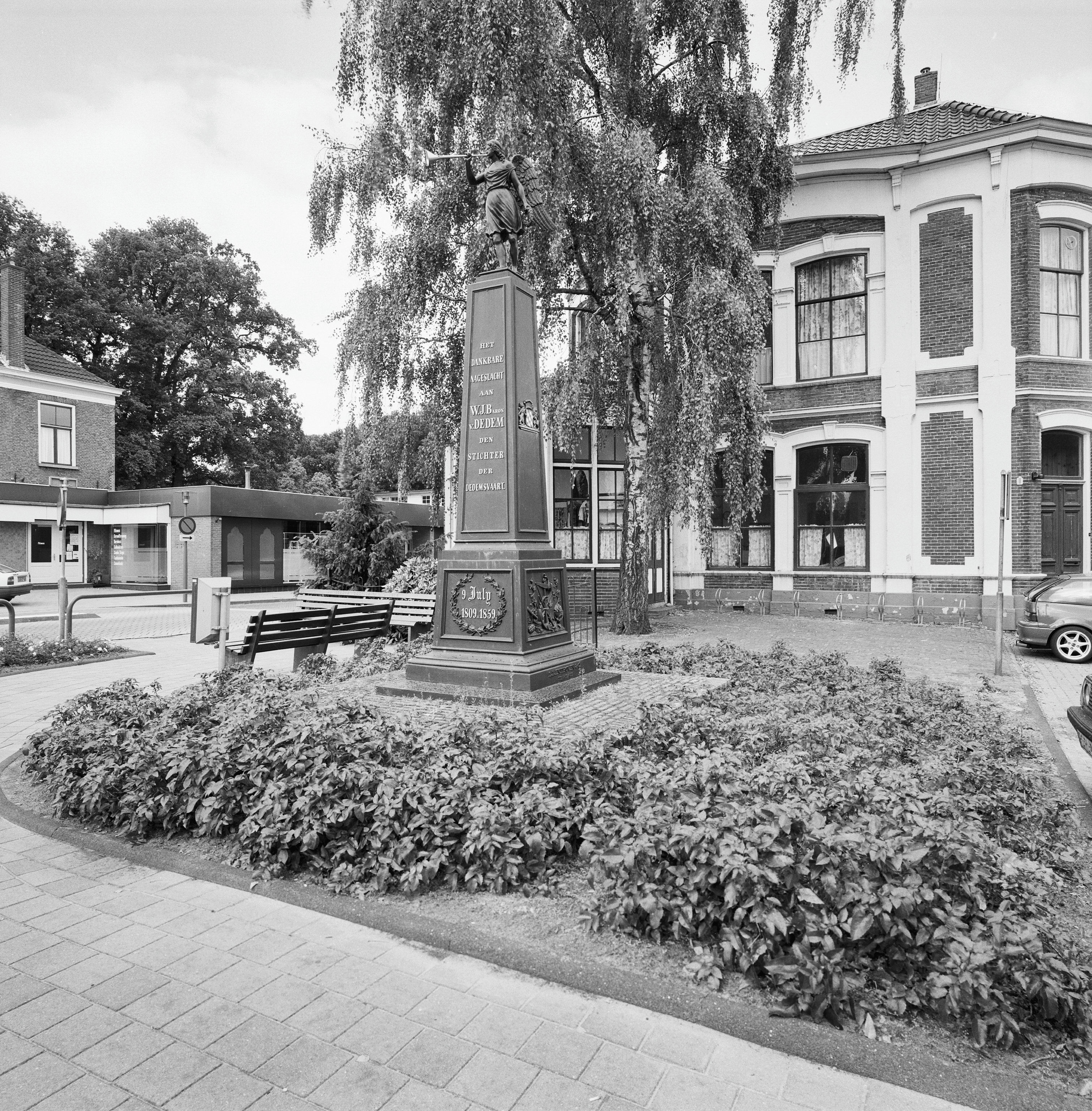
Monument in Dedemsvaart

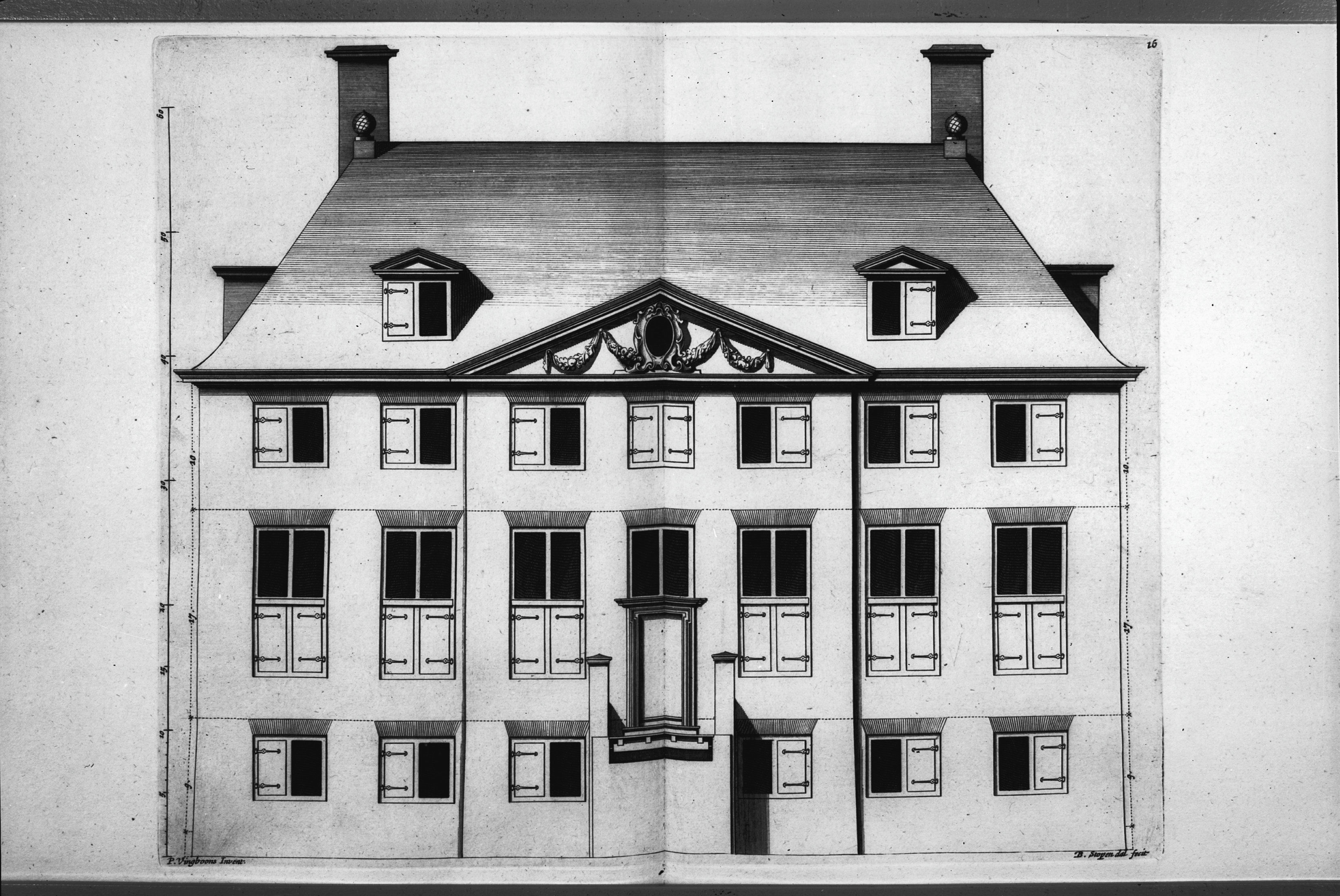
Drawing of Rollecate when it was still located in Vollenhove
