= Punthorst =

- Hamlet
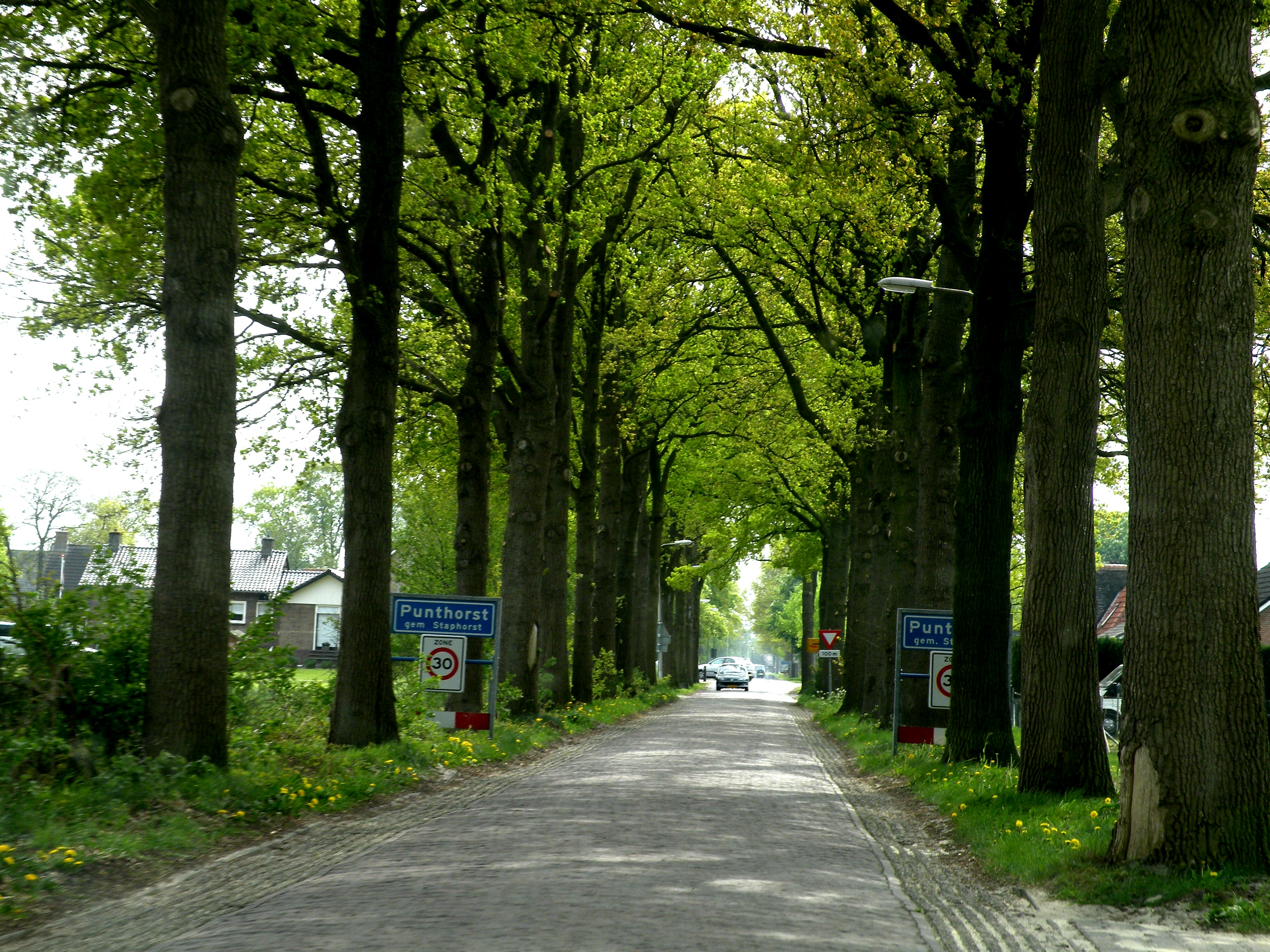
- Entrance to Punthorst

- Location in the province of Overijssel in the Netherlands Punthorst (Netherlands)
- Coordinates: 52°37′N 6°16′E
- Country: Netherlands
- Province: Overijssel
- Municipality: Staphorst
- Elevation: 2.7 m (8.9 ft)

Population (2021)
  - Total: 970
- Time zone: UTC+1 (CET)
  - Summer (DST): UTC+2 (CEST)
- Postcode: 7715
- Area code: 0529

Punthorst (Dutch pronunciation: [ˈpʏnt.ɦɔrst]) is a hamlet in the Dutch municipality of Staphorst in Overijssel. As of 2021, it had a population of 970.

Punthorst is a relatively young residential area, which mostly emerged in the 1930s. The place was first attested as de Punt in 1830–1855. Punthorst itself is most likely a compound of punt ('point') and horst ('overgrown elevated place').
