= Dedemsvaart =

Dedemsvaart De Voart
- Town
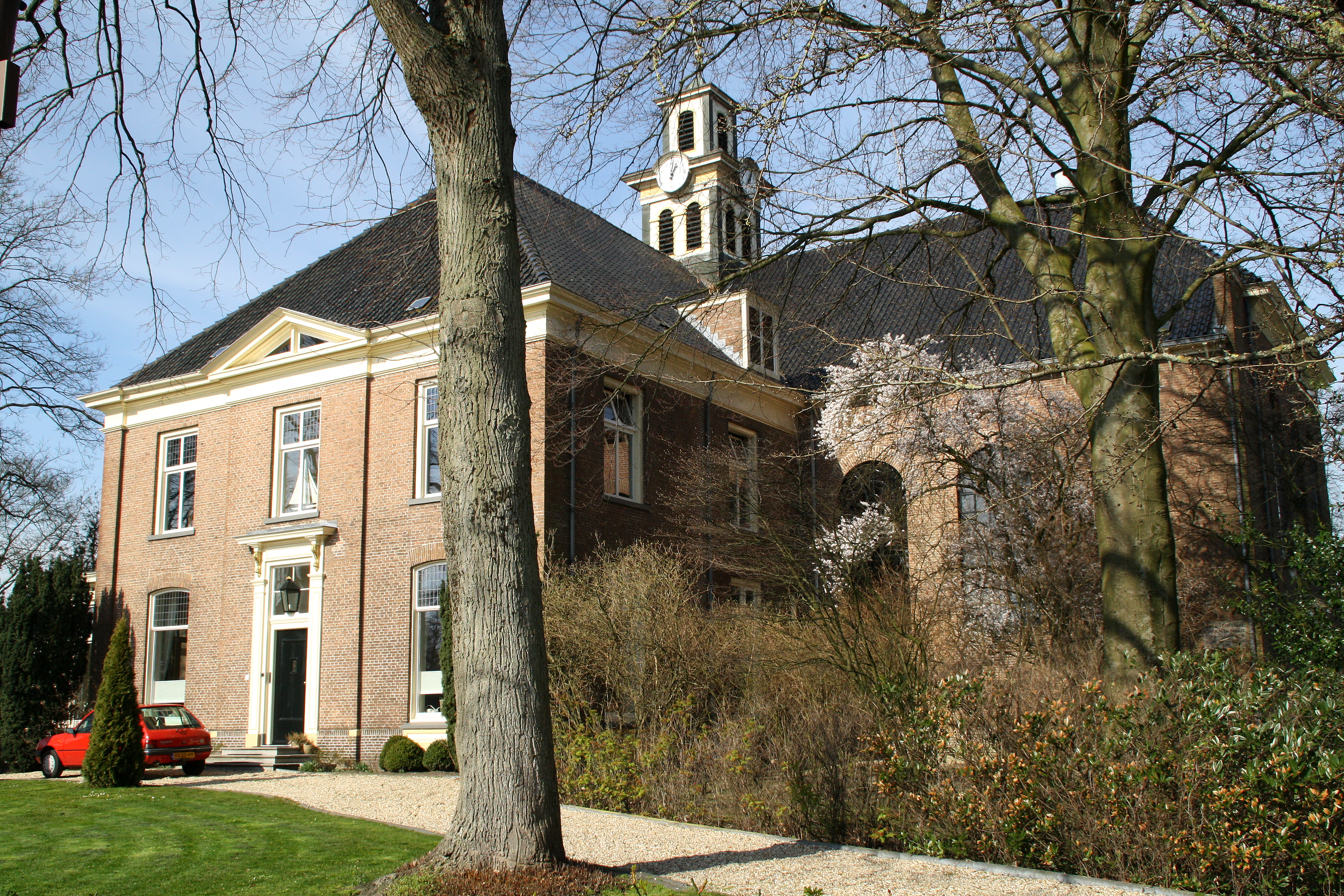
- Dutch Reformed Church

- Location in province of Overijssel in the Netherlands Dedemsvaart (Netherlands)
- Coordinates: 52°36′N 6°28′E
- Country: Netherlands
- Province: Overijssel
- Municipality: Hardenberg
- Established: 1811

Area
  - Total: 34.99 km^{2} (13.51 sq mi)
- Elevation: 7 m (23 ft)

Population (2021)
  - Total: 12,840
  - Density: 367.0/km^{2} (950.4/sq mi)
- Time zone: UTC+1 (CET)
  - Summer (DST): UTC+2 (CEST)
- Postal code: 7701
- Dialing code: 0523

Dedemsvaart ("Dedem's Canal") (Dutch Low Saxon: De Voart) is a town in Overijssel, the Netherlands.

== Overview ==
The town is located along an old canal, also called Dedemsvaart, which is the source of the village's name. The canal lost its commercial importance after World War II. The area around Dedemsvaart, until 2001 part of the municipality of Avereest, was an important centre for industry. Willem Jan van Dedem, after whom the canal and town were named, made a plan to dig a canal; construction began on 9 July 1810. Around two years later, in 1811, the canal had already reached Balkbrug, and the town was established.

In 1845 the project got into financial trouble and the baron had to forfeit the canal of Dedemsvaart, until then a private possession, to the province of Overijssel, who took further care of the canal. Over the years the canal changed and eventually became unfit for commercial use.

The village of Dedemsvaart lies near the N377 between Balkbrug and Lutten. The municipality of Avereest was disbanded in 2001 and became part of the municipality of Hardenberg. It's also the only settlement within the municipality where cannabis is semi-legally sold.

== Notable attractions ==
- Tuinen Mien Ruys, a complex of 25 gardens by noted Dutch landscape and garden architect Mien Ruys.
- Kalkovens, three big lime kilns, these were built in 1820.

== Notable people ==
- Henk Dorgelo (1894–1961), physicist and academic
- Sanne Hans (born 1984), singer-songwriter
- Daniel Koerhuis (born 1981), politician
- Birgit Kos (born 1995), fashion model
- Martin Koster (born 1950), author
- Reinier Paping (1931–2021), speedskater, the winner of the 1963 Elfstedentocht better known as "the hell of '63"
- Anna Charlotte Ruys (1898–1977), professor of bacteriology and epidemiology
- Jannie Visscher (born 1961), politician
- Jarno Westerman (born 2002), football player
- Fernon Wibier (born 1971), tennis player

== Gallery ==
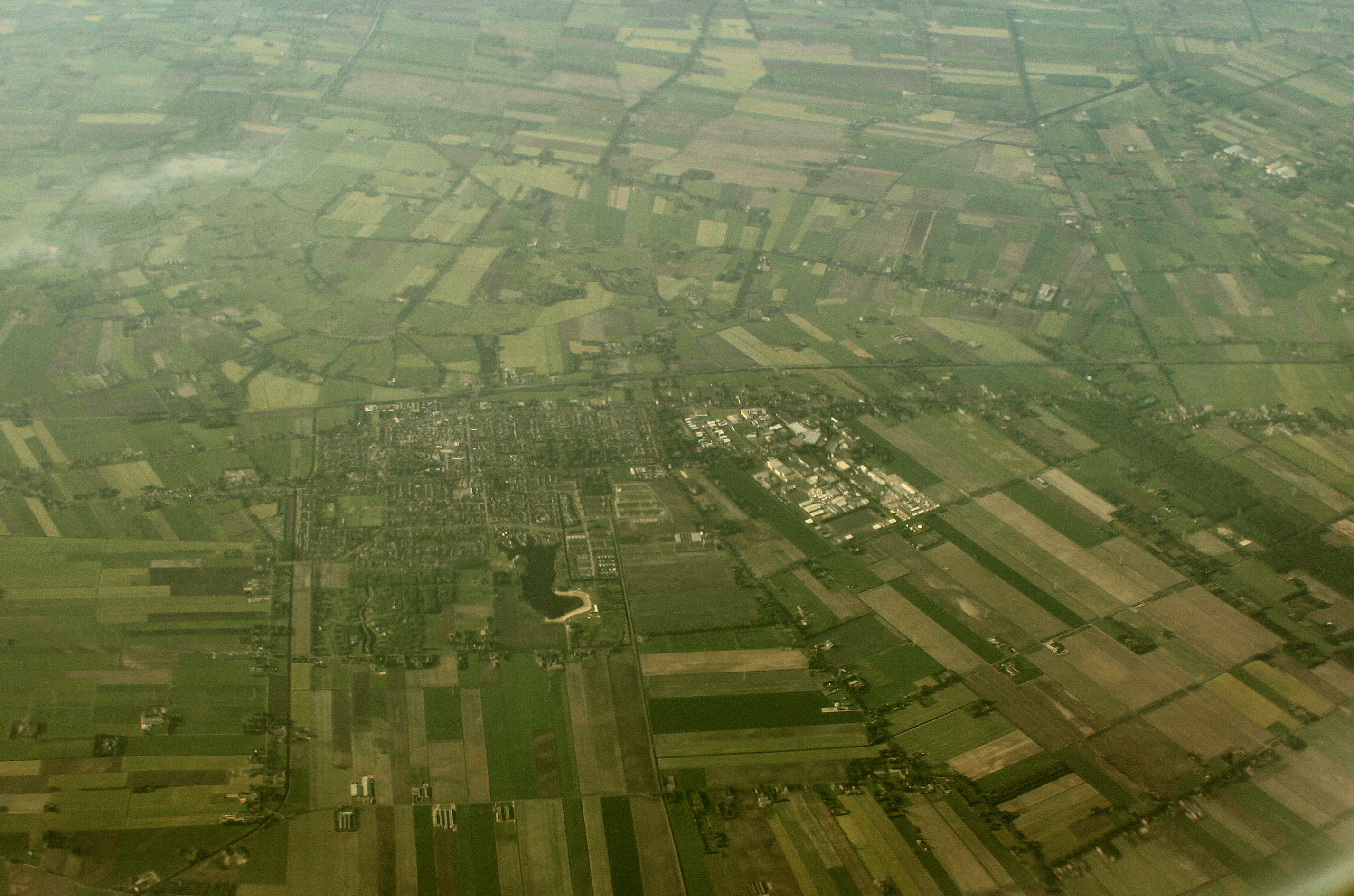
Aerial photograph of Dedemsvaart

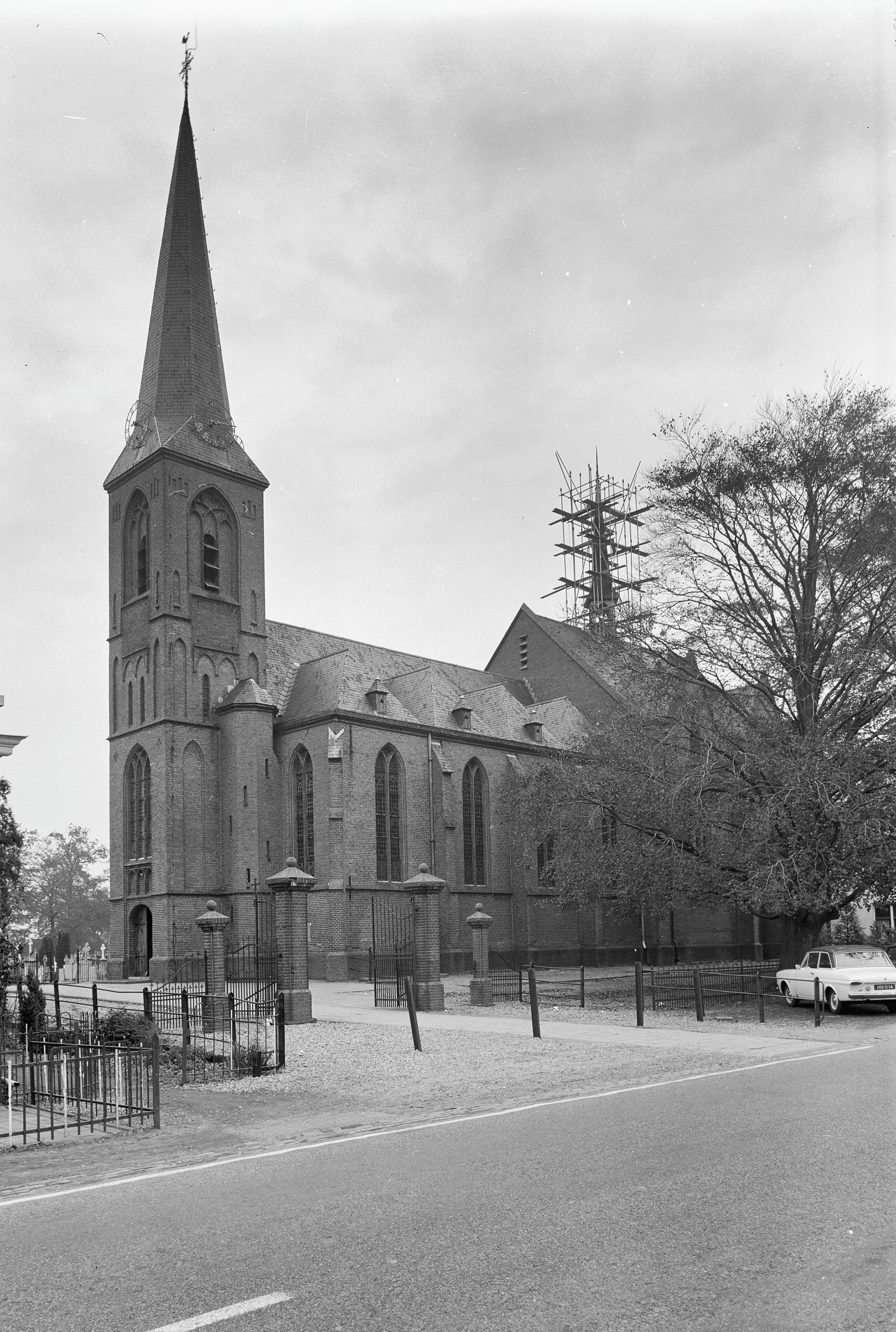
Roman Catholic church

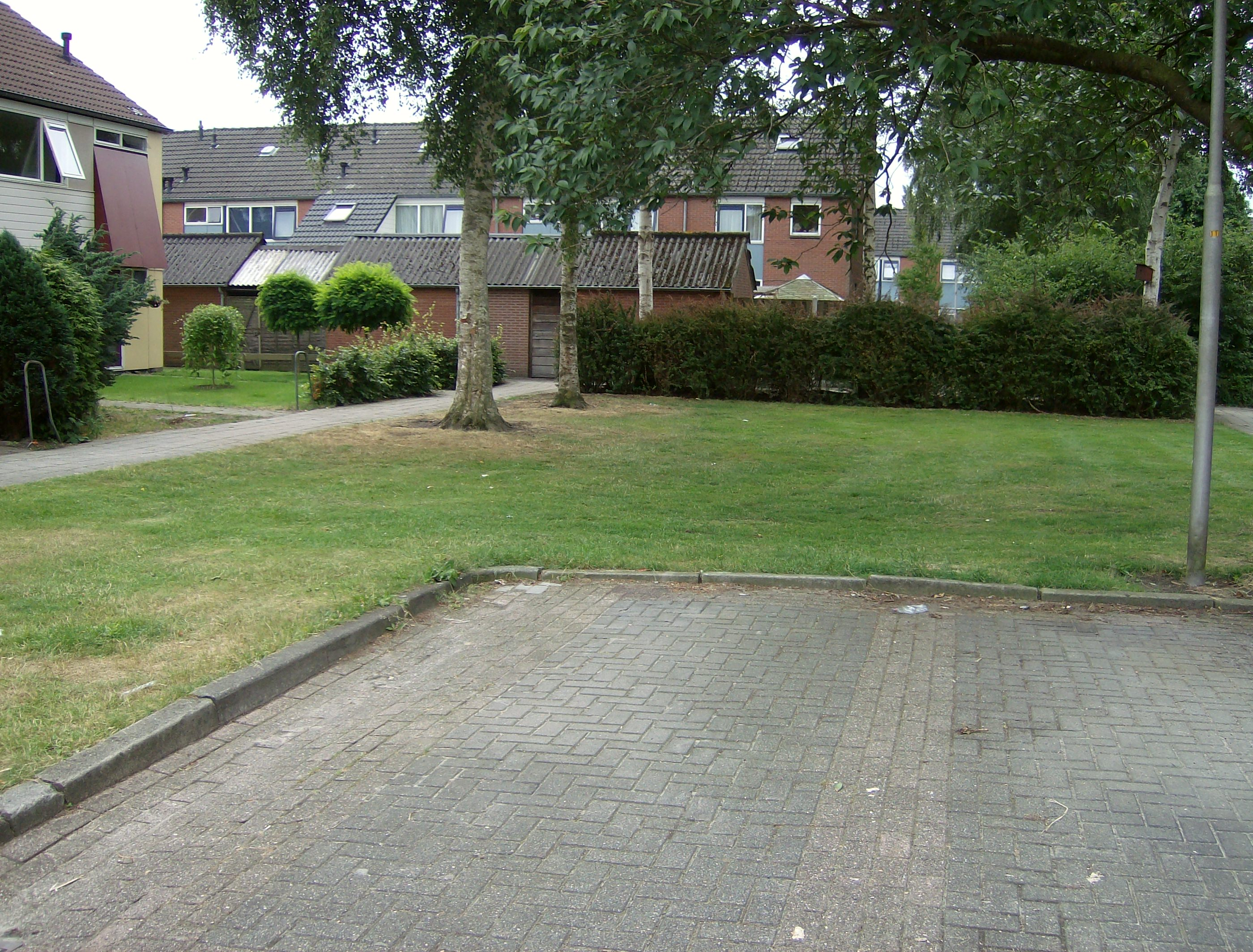
Little court

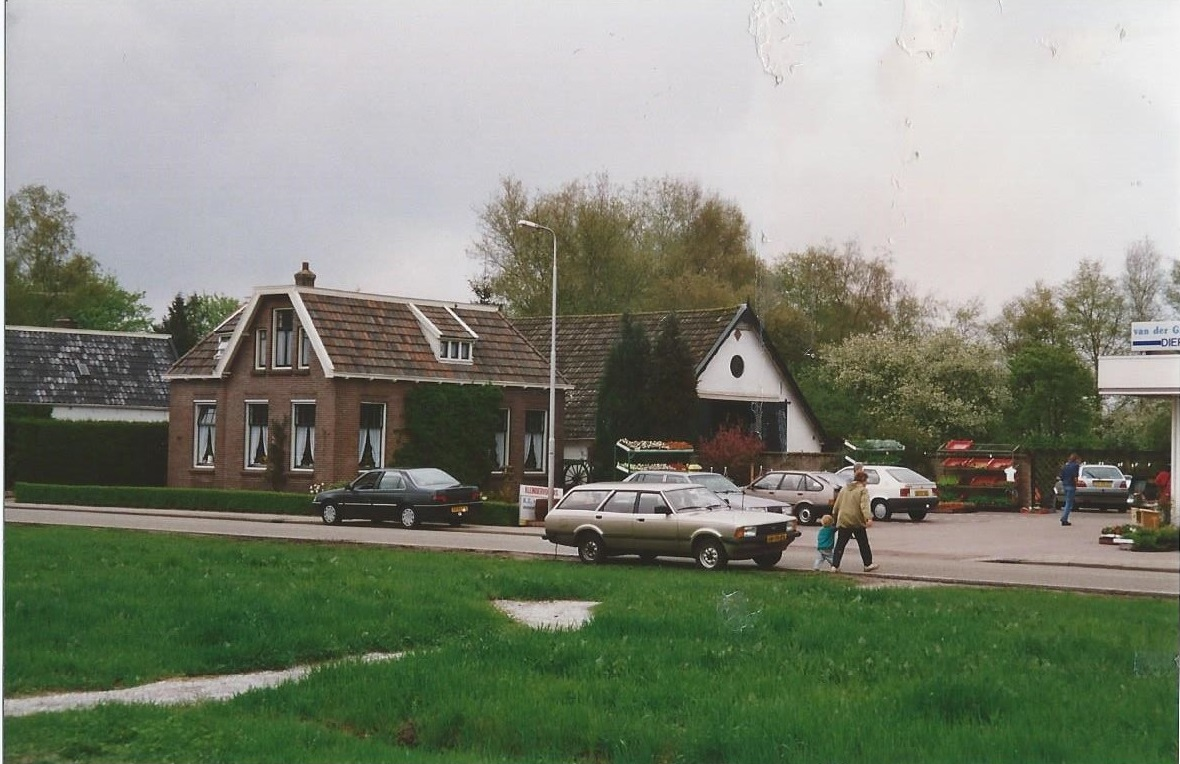
Street view
