= Staphorst =

- Municipality
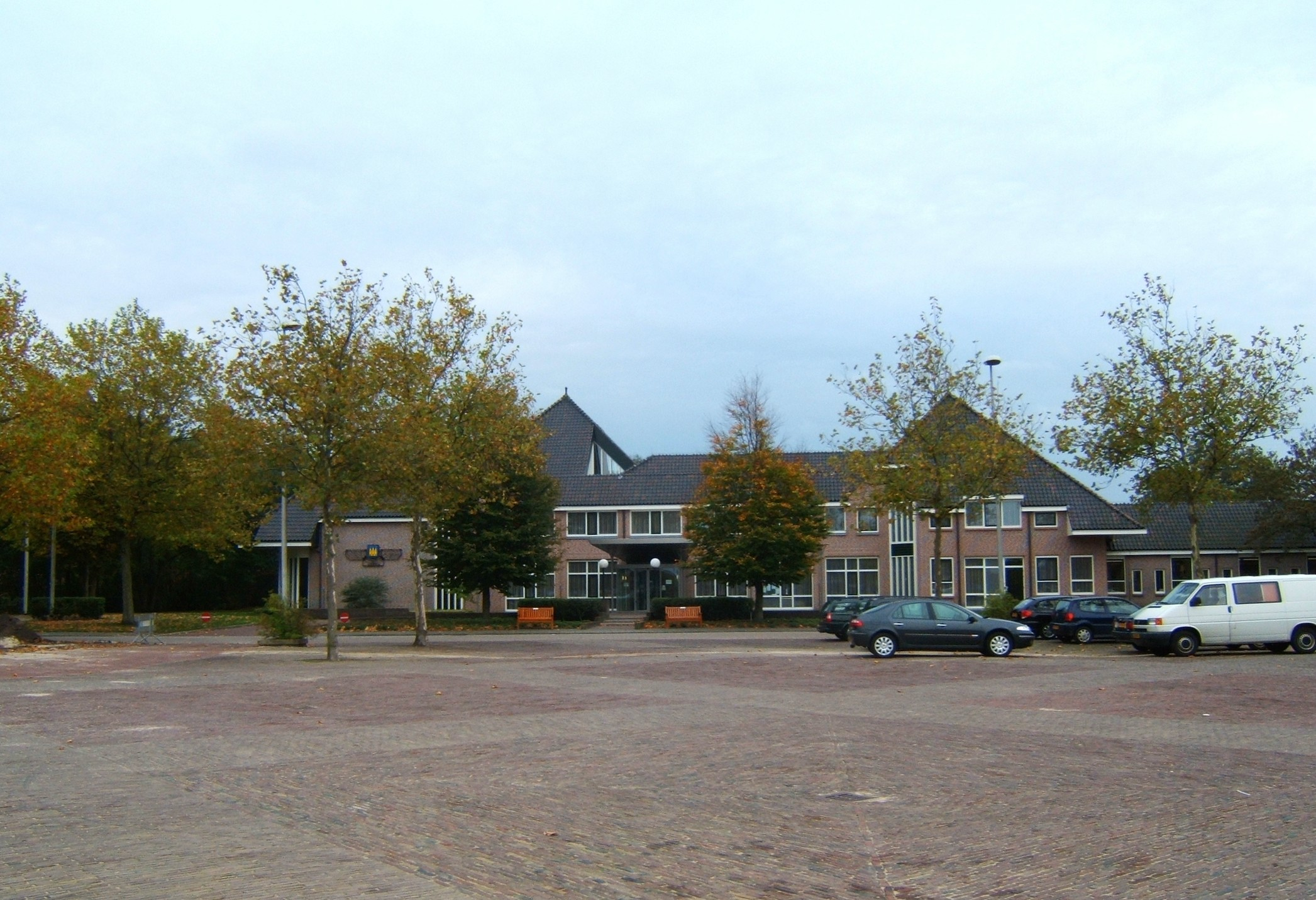
- Staphorst city hall

- Flag Coat of arms

- Location in Overijssel

- Location within Overijssel Location within Netherlands
- Coordinates: 52°39′N 6°13′E
- Country: Netherlands
- Province: Overijssel

Government
  - Body: Municipal council
  - Mayor: Jan ten Kate (Ind.)

Area
  - Total: 135.69 km^{2} (52.39 sq mi)
  - Land: 133.99 km^{2} (51.73 sq mi)
  - Water: 1.70 km^{2} (0.66 sq mi)
- Elevation: 1 m (3.3 ft)

Population (2026)
  - Total: 18,220
  - Density: 129/km^{2} (330/sq mi)
  - Town/Urban Center: 6,710
- Demonym(s): Staphorstenaar, Staphorster
- Time zone: UTC+1 (CET)
  - Summer (DST): UTC+2 (CEST)
- Postcode: 7715, 7950–7955
- Area code: 0522
- Website: www.staphorst.nl

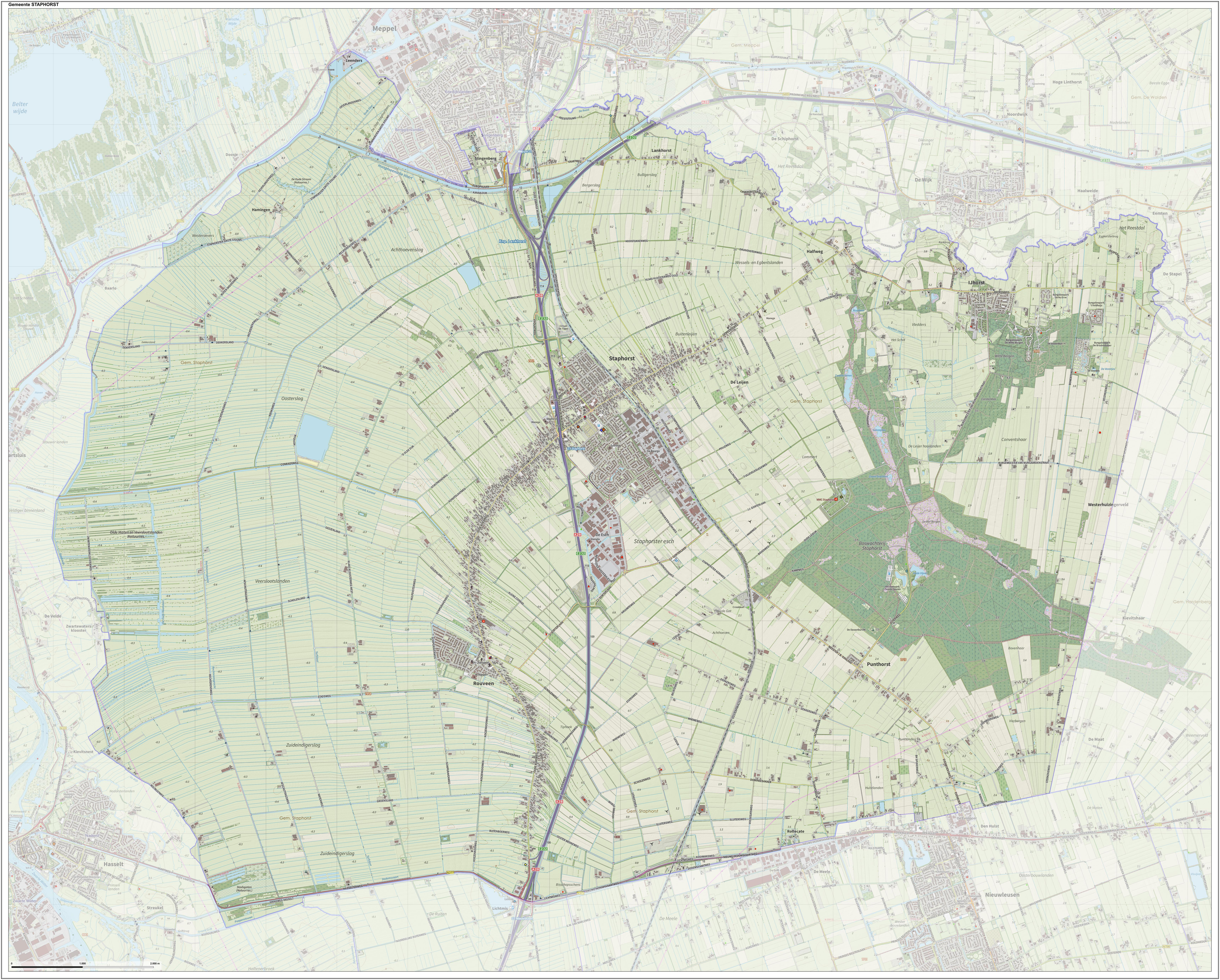
Dutch Topographic map of the municipality of Staphorst, June 2015

Staphorst (Dutch pronunciation: [ˈstɑpɦɔrst]) is a municipality and a town in the eastern Netherlands.

== History ==
The villages of Staphorst and its southern neighbour Rouveen came into existence in the 13th century, when monks started to bring the bogs and swamps into culture.

All the farms were built along the long road through the bog area. Thus a lengthy row of farms was built, becoming the 11 km (7 mi) long village of Staphorst-Rouveen. This phenomenon is called in Dutch: lintbebouwing (ribbon urbanization). In many parts of the Netherlands this type of village is quite common, e.g. Vriezenveen, the villages along river dykes in the Netherlands, the so-called moor-colonies in the provinces Drenthe and Groningen, as well as the German regions opposite the border.

Staphorst was a Dutch municipality, created through a decree by French emperor Napoleon who merged four smaller entities into a much larger one. The 1811 decree merged the villages of Rouveen, Staphorst and IJhorst along with nearby sparsely populated Hasselter schoutambt (a judicial entity) into a municipality, known since 1818 as Staphorst. Except for a few minor changes, Staphorst's borders have remained unchanged, making it an anomaly in Dutch municipal history.

A specialty for Staphorst is, that after a farmer's death, his land was often divided between his sons. The son who did not inherit his father's farm built a farm-house for his own behind the other. Therefore, many pieces of farmland are very lengthy, yet narrow (e.g. 1500 x 40 metres). Originally, each piece of land was 125 metres wide.

The farms are of the traditional Low Saxon type. They have green doors and window shutters. Most farms existing now were built between 1850 and 1910.

== Society ==
Staphorst is still a largely orthodox Calvinist village and has one of the highest church attendancy rates of the Netherlands. In 1971, Staphorst became world news due to an outbreak of polio. 39 people (mostly children) became infected with polio. Of these, five died and a number of others became disabled. 20% of residents remain unvaccinated for religious reasons. As a result, Staphorst and other similar areas in the Netherlands are classified as risk areas by the WHO – the only such area in Europe.

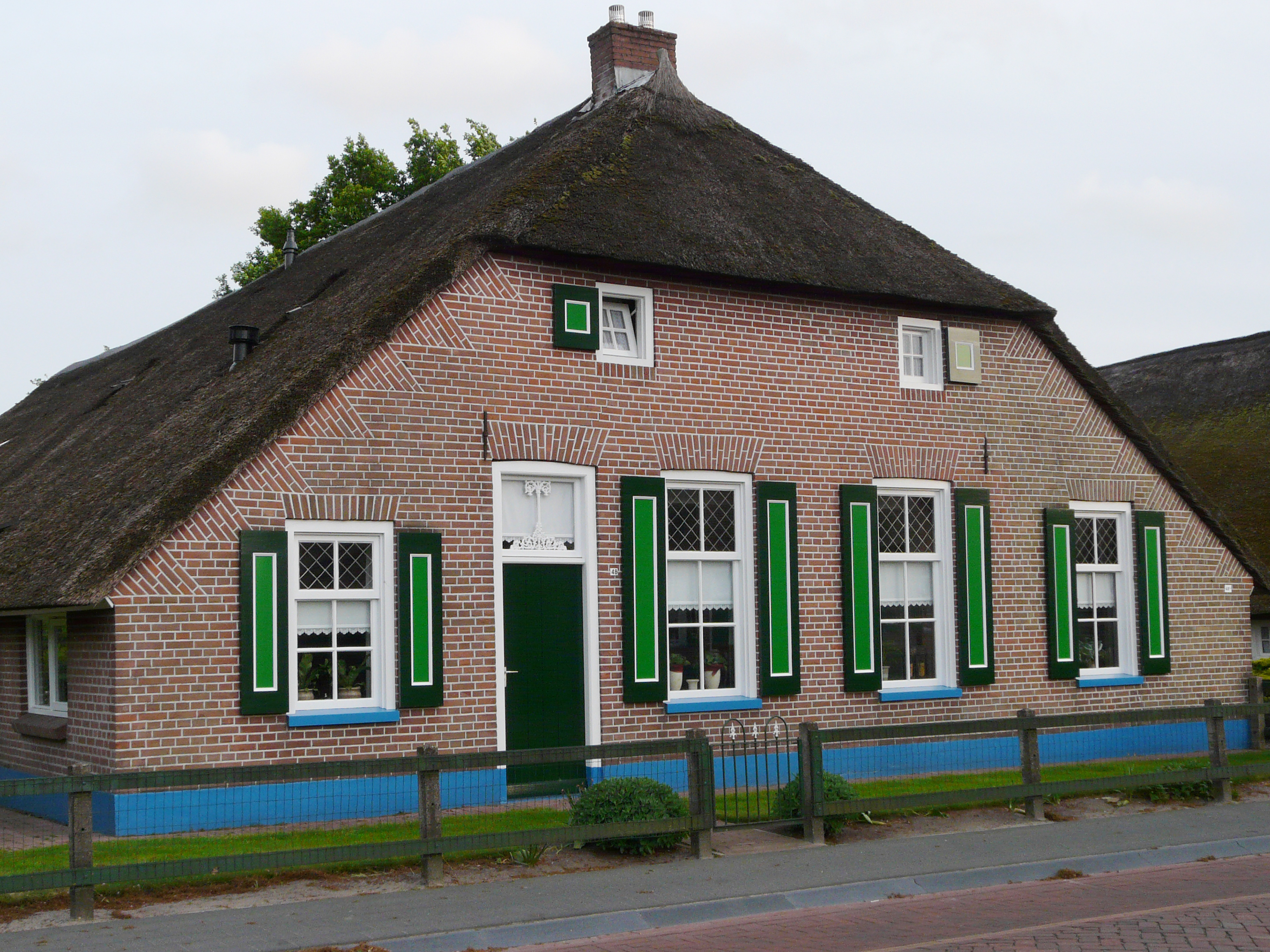
Staphorster farmhouse in authentic colors

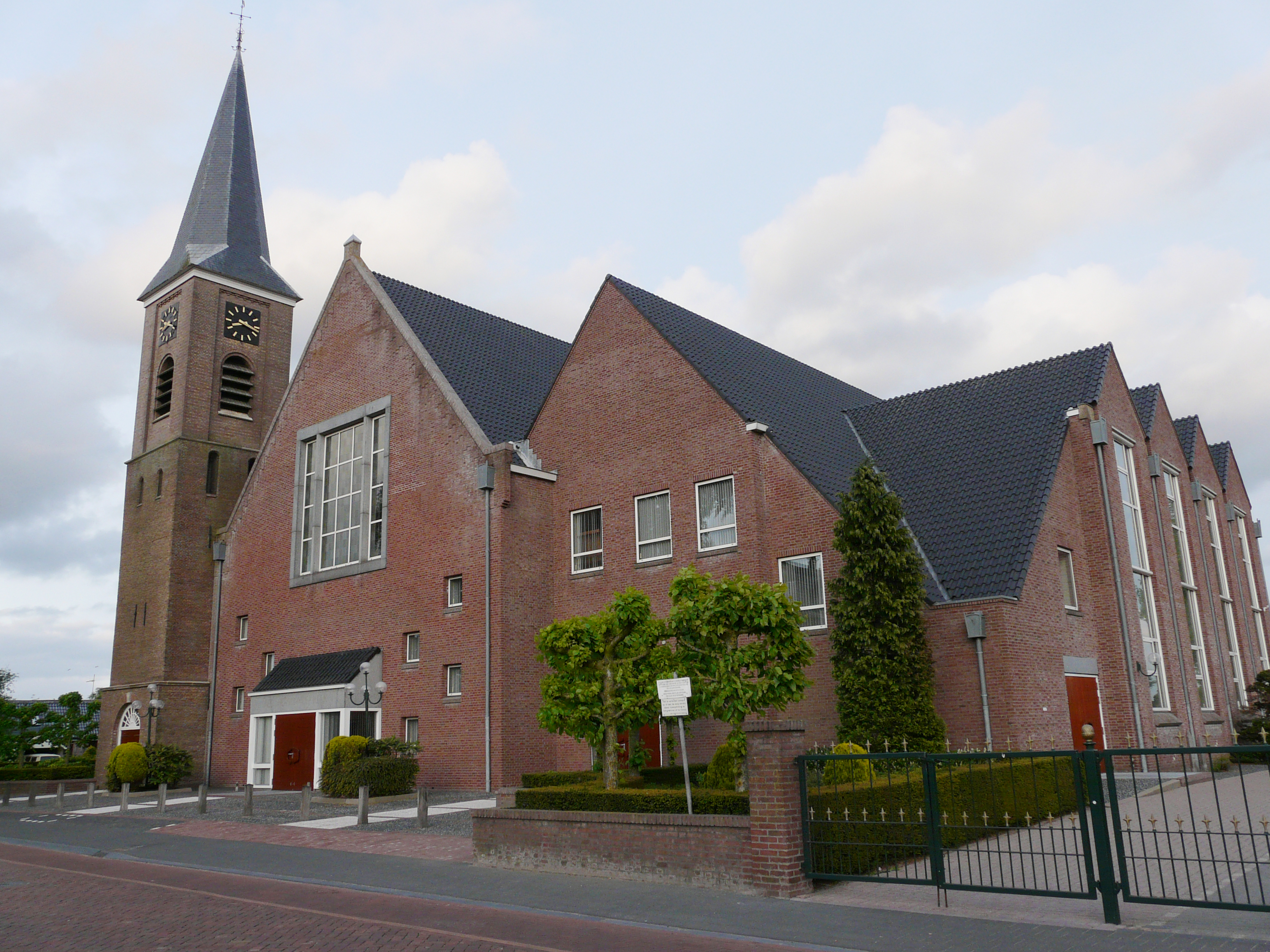
Restored Reformed Church Dorpskerk (2300 seats)

The Total Fertility Rate (TFR) in Staphorst at 2.76 was 4th highest in all of Netherlands in 2003. That makes Staphorst a place with one of the highest birth rates in all of Europe.

== Population centres ==
- Halfweg
- Hamingen
- IJhorst
- Lankhorst
- De Leijen
- Punthorst
- Rouveen
- Slingenberg
- Staphorst

== Demographics ==
Staphorst had a sustainable birth rate until the beginning of 21st century. But during the 2000–07 period, the birth rate dropped considerably.

- Birth Rate: 15.79 per 1000 (down from 18.96 in 2000).
- Death Rate: 6.98 per 1000.
- NGR: +0.88%

The birth rate of Staphorst declined further to 14.9‰ in 2016, while the total fertility rate declined to 2,65 children per woman.

== Notable people ==
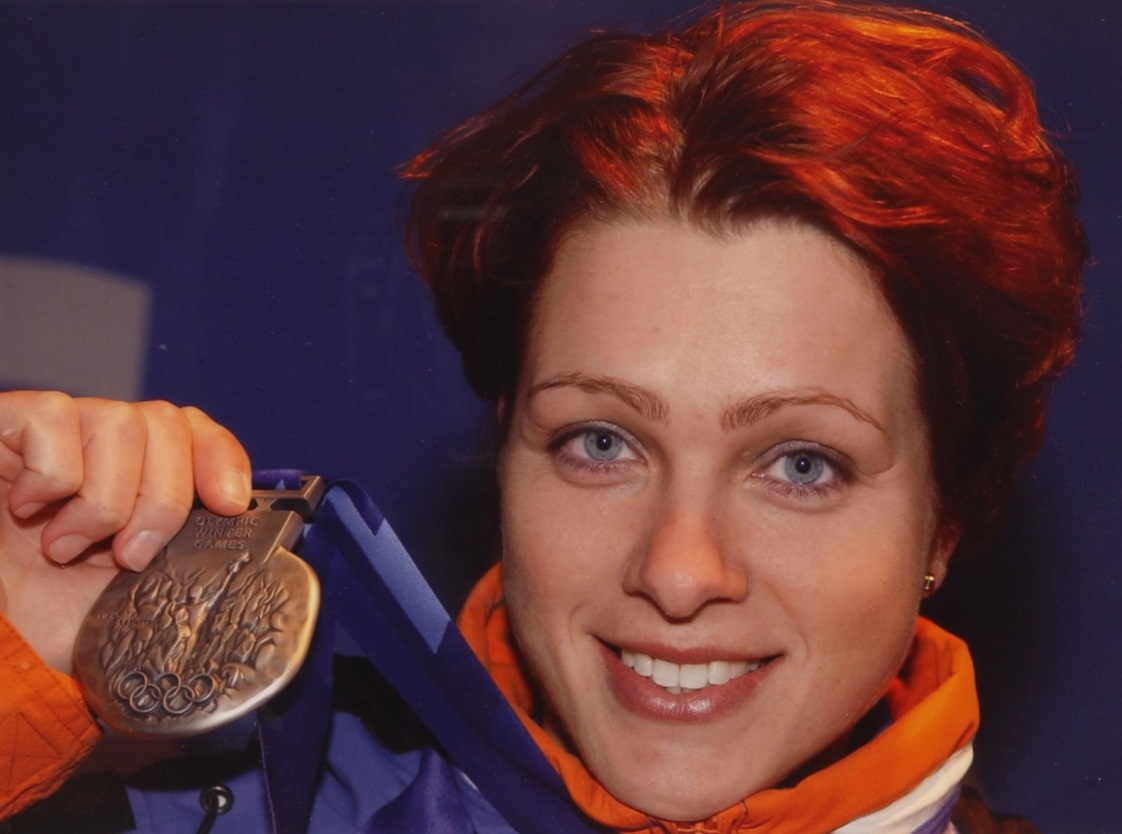
Gretha Smit, 2002

- Lambertus Johannes Hansen (1803 in Staphorst – 1859) Dutch painter
- Tjerk Vermaning (1929 in Staphorst – 1986) a controversial Dutch amateur archaeologist
- Roelof Bisschop (born 1956 in Staphorst) a Dutch historian and politician
- Peter Stegeman, known professionally as the Staphorster Boertje (1840 in Staphorst – 1922)

=== Sport ===
- Marc Houtzager (born 1971 in Rouveen) a Dutch show jumping equestrian, silver medallist at the 2012 Summer Olympics
- Bert Konterman (born 1971 in Rouveen) former professional footballer with 470 appearances for clubs in the Netherlands and Scotland.
- Gretha Smit (born 1976 in Rouveen) a Dutch former speed skater, silver medallist in the 2002 Winter Olympics

== Gallery ==
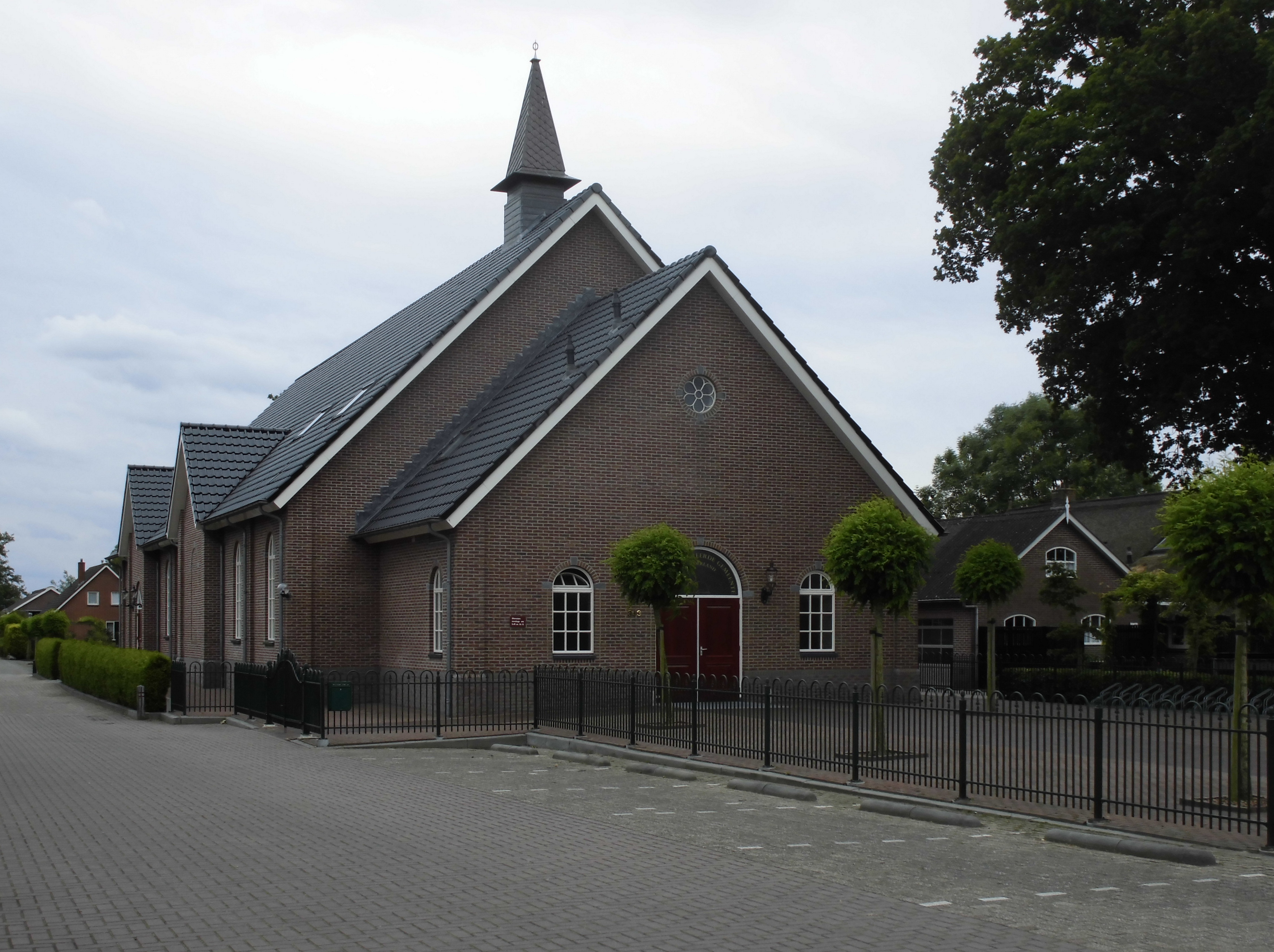
Rouveen - Oud Gereformeerde Kerk

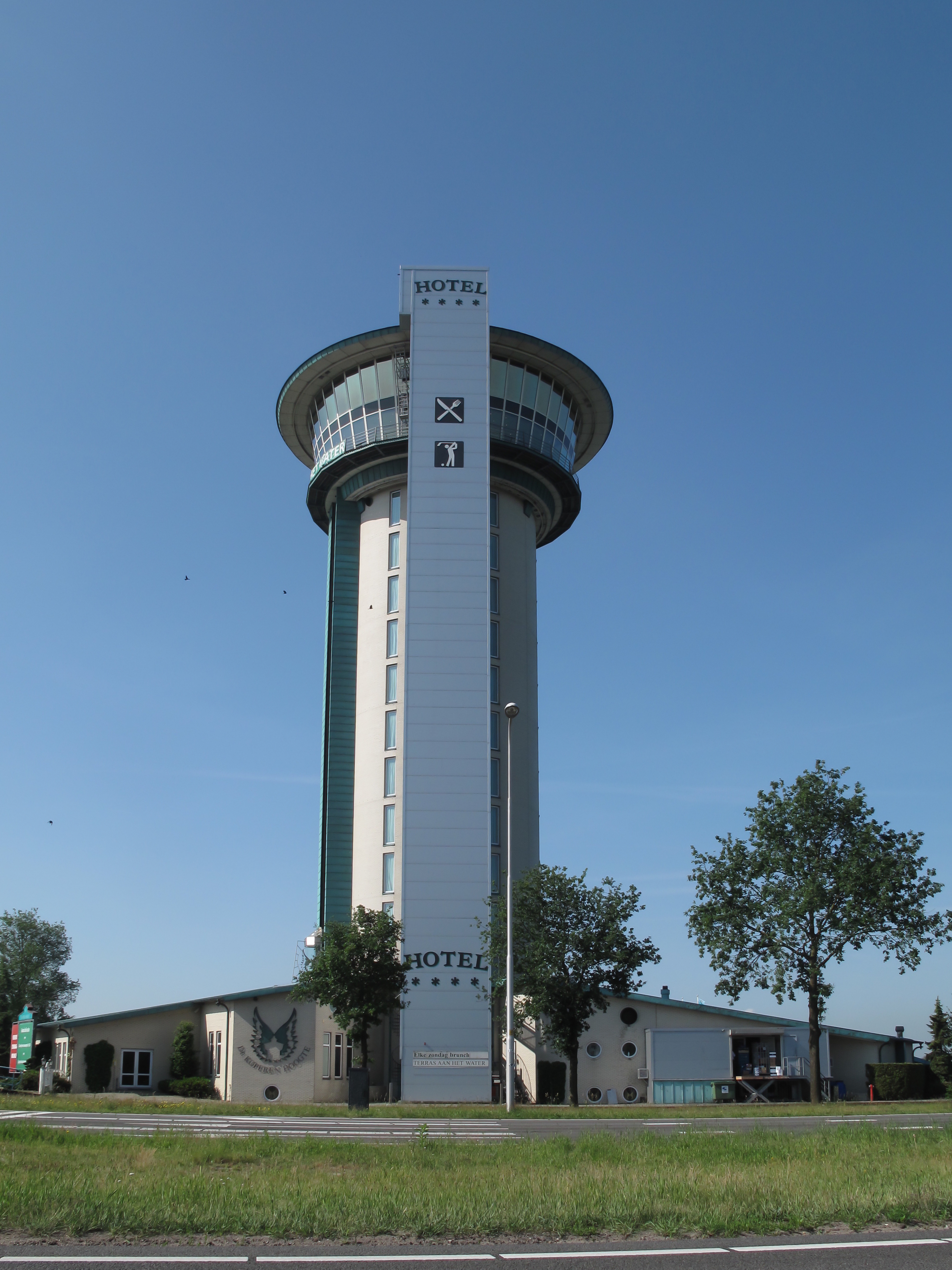
Rouveen, hotel

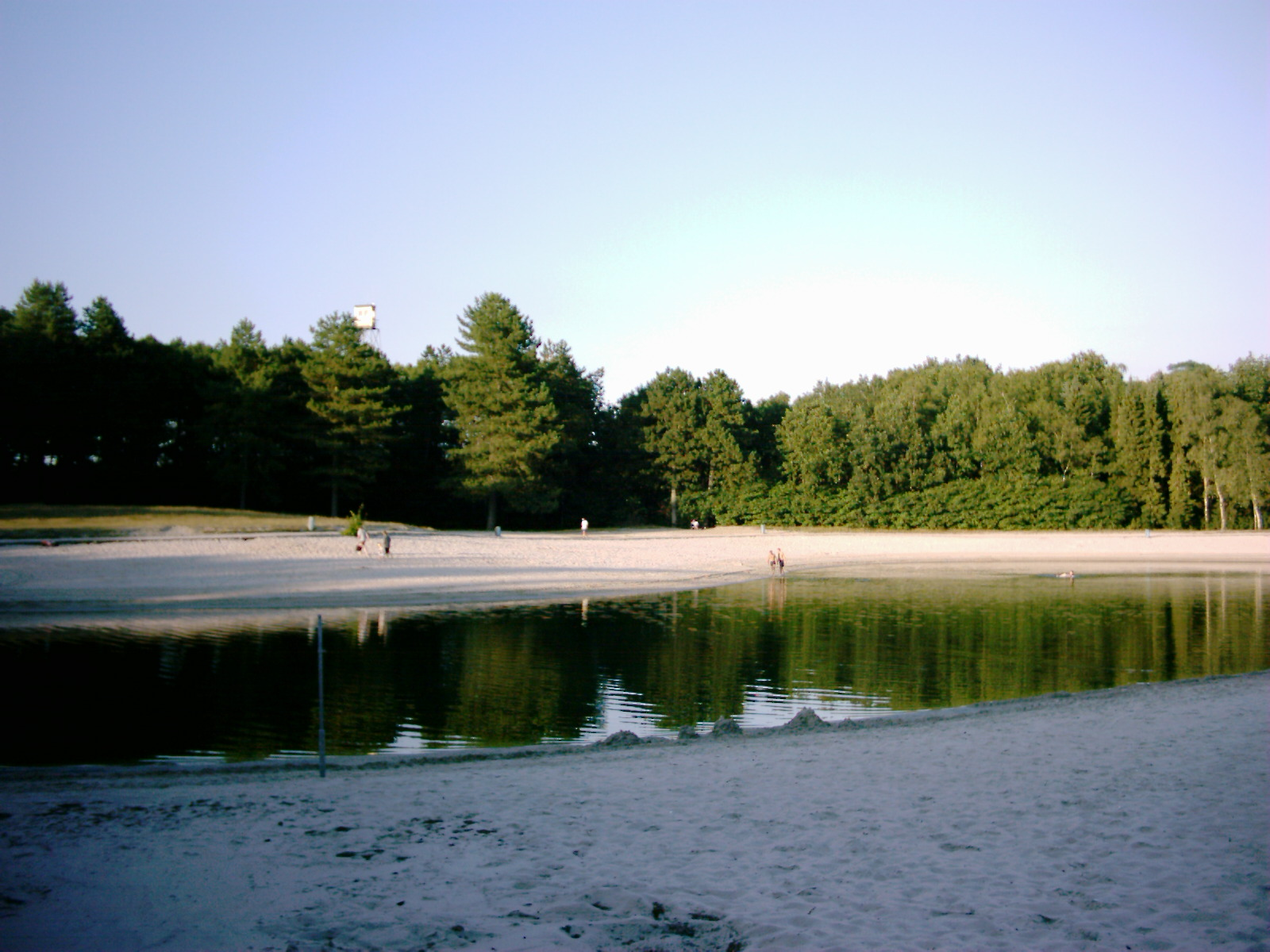
Forest Service Staphorst, Recreational pond 'de Zwarte Dennen'

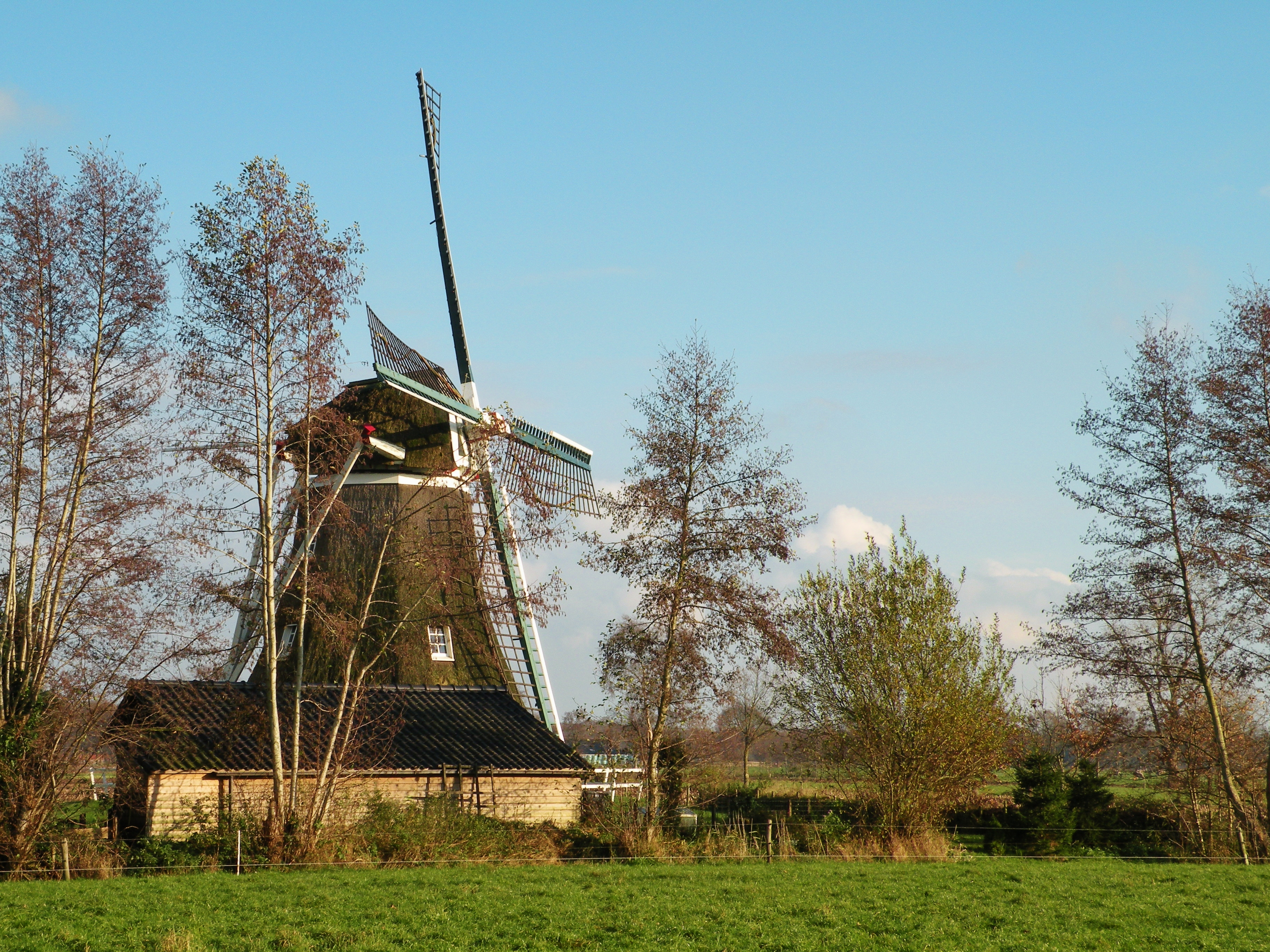
Molen De Leijen, Staphorst
