= Achter 't Hout =

- Hamlet
- Location in the province of Drenthe in the Netherlands Achter 't Hout (Netherlands)
- Coordinates: 52.99534°N 6.79348°E
- Country: Netherlands
- Province: Drenthe
- Municipality: Aa en Hunze
- Village: Gieten
- Elevation: 8.5 m (28 ft)
- Time zone: UTC+1 (CET)
  - Summer (DST): UTC+2 (CEST)
- Postcode: 9461
- Area code: 0592

Achter 't Hout (Dutch: [ˈɑx.tər ət ˈɦɑu̯t]) is a hamlet in the municipality of Aa en Hunze, in the province of Drenthe.

The hamlet is located between Bonnen and Kostvlies, north of the Grensweg, the dividing road between Gasselte and Gieten, of which it is located to the southeast. Like the hamlets of Bonnen and Veenhof, it belongs to Gieten regarding addressing.

The street name is written as Achter het Hout, Dutch for "behind the woods". An older spelling for the hamlet, from around 1900, is Achter 't Holt.
