= Ekehaar =

- Village
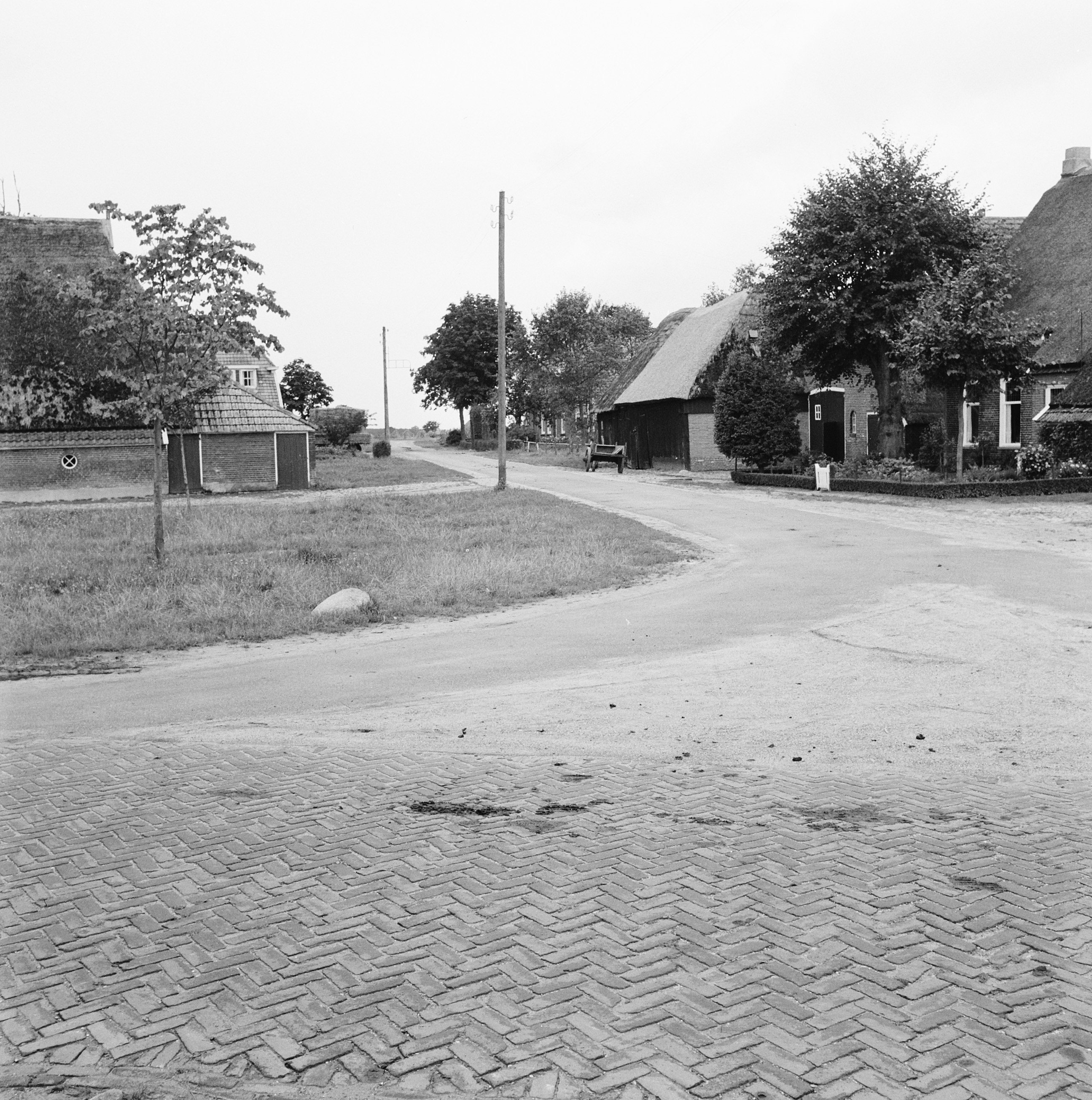
- Street in Ekehaar

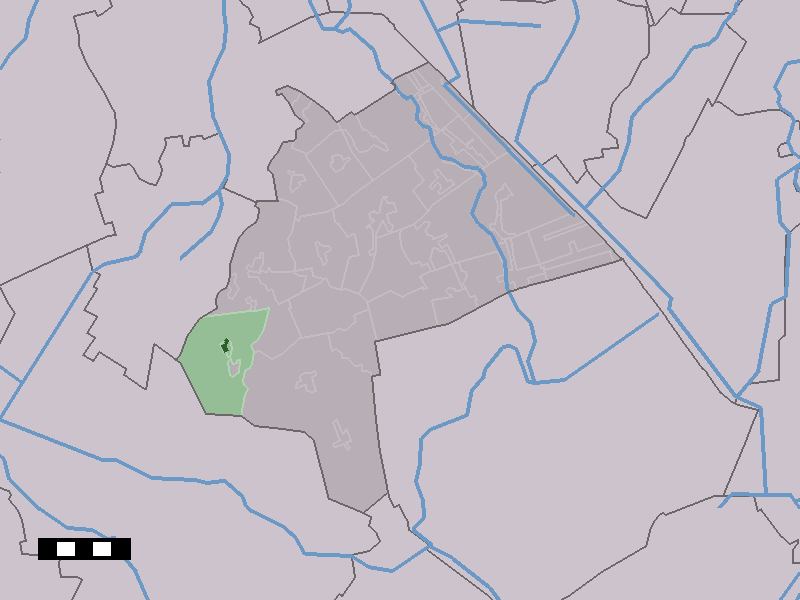
- The town centre (dark green) and the statistical district (light green) of Ekehaar in the municipality of Aa en Hunze.

- Location in the Netherlands Ekehaar (Netherlands)
- Coordinates: 52°57′9″N 6°36′9″E
- Country: Netherlands
- Province: Drenthe
- Municipality: Aa en Hunze

Area
  - Total: 9.12 km^{2} (3.52 sq mi)
- Elevation: 14 m (46 ft)

Population (2021)
  - Total: 430
  - Density: 47/km^{2} (120/sq mi)
- Time zone: UTC+1 (CET)
  - Summer (DST): UTC+2 (CEST)
- Postal code: 9453 & 9454
- Dialing code: 0592

Ekehaar is a village in the Dutch province of Drenthe. It is a part of the municipality of Aa en Hunze, and lies about 6 km south of Assen.

== History ==
The village was first mentioned in 1423 as Hekehair, and means "sandy ridge with oak trees".

Ekehaar was home to 35 people in 1840.

Ekehaar also has a primary school, OBS De Flint. The school is meant as a school for children from Ekehaar, Amen, Eldersloo, Eleveld and other surrounding villages.
