= Cour du Nord =

Coordinates: 52°58′7.54″N 6°40′18.05″E

- Interactive map of Cour du Nord

Restaurant information
- Head chef: Pieter de Ronde
- Food type: French
- Rating: Michelin Guide
- Location: Veldweg 22-24, Nooitgedacht, Drenthe, 9449 PW, Netherlands
- Seating capacity: 48

Cour du Nord was a restaurant located in Nooitgedacht, Drenthe, in the Netherlands. It was a fine dining restaurant that was awarded one Michelin star in 2009 and 2010.

The restaurant closed for public in 2011.

Head chefs of Cour du Nord in the time of the Michelin star were Pieter de Ronde (2009) and Marco Philips (2010).

Cour du Nord was one of the five restaurants in the luxury holiday resort Hof van Saksen. It was the first Dutch restaurant in a holiday resort that was awarded a Michelin star.

Originally, the restaurant was located in the centre of the resort and had a seating capacity of 70. In 2010, it moved to a building close to the entrance to attract more outside visitors. With the move, the restaurant hoped to be able to chase a second star. Instead of getting a second star, they lost their star.

Chef Robert Kranenborg was culinary advisor of Hof van saksen and responsible for the selection of the team that would build Cour du Nord. As head chef he selected a member of his own kitchen crew at Corona, Pieter de Ronde.

== Head chefs ==
- 2007-2009: Pieter de Ronde
- 2009-2011: Marco Philips
- 2011: Omar Dahak

== See also ==
- List of Michelin starred restaurants in the Netherlands
