= Eexterzandvoort =

- Hamlet
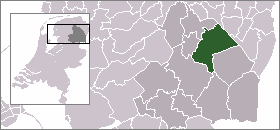

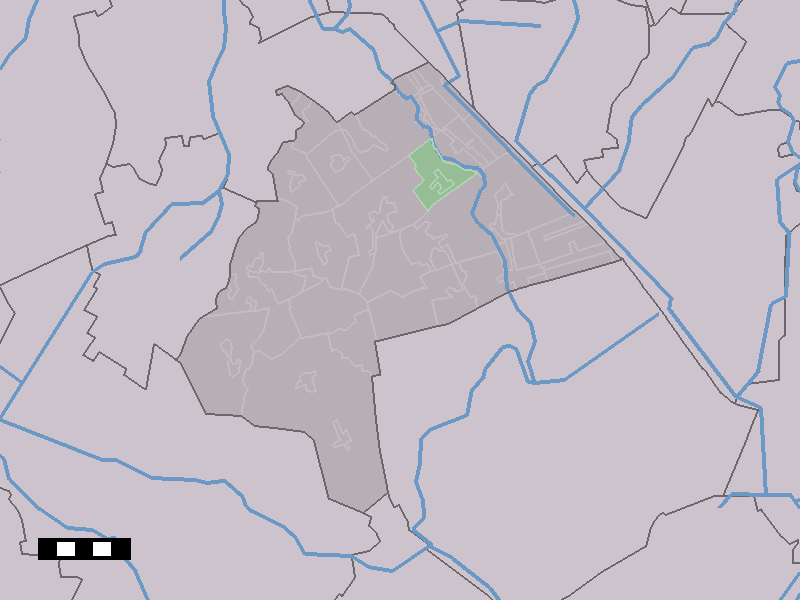
- Eexterzandvoort in the municipality of Aa en Hunze.
- Coordinates: 53°2′N 6°47′E
- Country: Netherlands
- Province: Drenthe
- Municipality: Aa en Hunze

Population (1 January 2008)
  - Total: 154
- Time zone: UTC+1 (CET)
  - Summer (DST): UTC+2 (CEST)

Eexterzandvoort is a hamlet in the Dutch province of Drenthe. It is a part of the municipality of Aa en Hunze, and lies about 15 km east of Assen on the road from Eext to Eexterveen. On the north of the hamlet is the stream Hunze, and on the eastern side is the road N33.

As well on the northern side (Hunzedal) of the hamlet as on the southern side (Breevenen) are areas from the foundation Drentsch Landschap situated. The foundation tries on these areas to bring back the situation as it was before the cultivation started.

The statistical area "Eexterzandvoort", which also can include the surrounding countryside, has a population of around 140.
