= Balloërveld =

Balloërveld Ballooërveld
- Hamlet
- Flag

- Location in the province of Drenthe in the Netherlands Balloërveld (Netherlands)
- Coordinates: 53°1′N 6°38′E
- Country: Netherlands
- Province: Drenthe
- Municipality: Aa en Hunze
- Elevation: 8.2 m (27 ft)

Population (2023)
  - Total: 14
- Time zone: UTC+1 (CET)
  - Summer (DST): UTC+2 (CEST)
- Postcode: 9459
- Area code: 0592

Balloërveld or Ballooërveld (Dutch pronunciation: [ˌbɑloːərˈvɛlt]) is a hamlet in the municipality of Aa en Hunze in the province of Drenthe in the Netherlands.

Balloërveld owes its name to the nearby village of Balloo. The hamlet is located on the old main road Loon - Gasteren, on the edge of the Drentsche Aa National Landscape. In 2023, 14 people lived in the hamlet. The hamlet has its own zip code. South of the town is the eponymous Balloërveld nature reserve, known for its sand drifts and peat lakes.
