= Aa en Hunze =

- Municipality
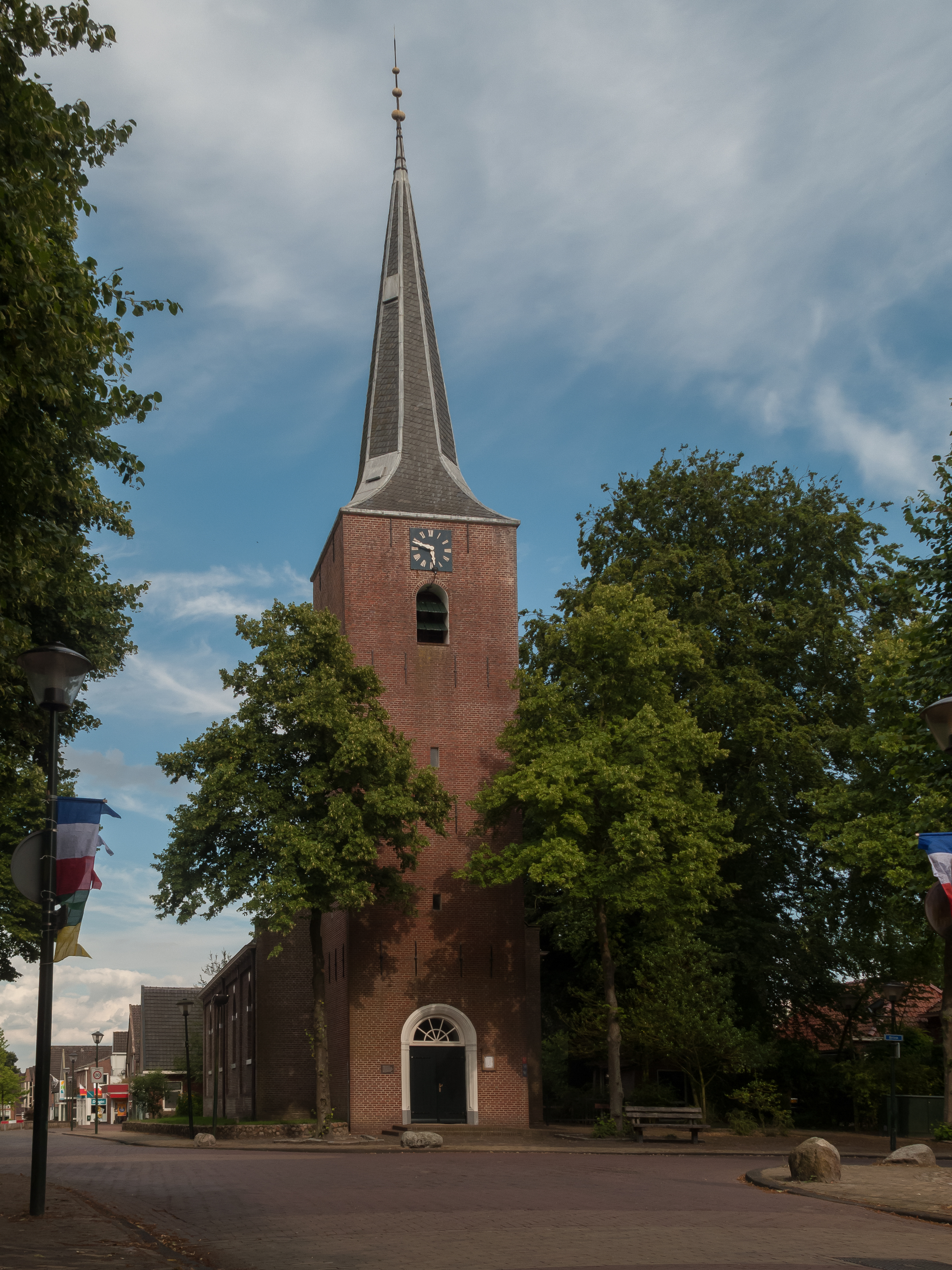
- Reformed church in Gieten

- Flag Coat of arms

- Location in Drenthe
- Coordinates: 53°0′N 6°46′E
- Country: Netherlands
- Province: Drenthe
- Established: 1 January 1998

Government
  - Body: Municipal council
  - Mayor: Anno Wietze Hiemstra (CDA)

Area
  - Total: 278.87 km^{2} (107.67 sq mi)
  - Land: 276.09 km^{2} (106.60 sq mi)
  - Water: 2.78 km^{2} (1.07 sq mi)
- Elevation: 20 m (66 ft)

Population (January 2021)
  - Total: 25,399
  - Density: 92/km^{2} (240/sq mi)
- Time zone: UTC+1 (CET)
  - Summer (DST): UTC+2 (CEST)
- Postcode: 9443–9469, 9510–9519, 9654–9659
- Area code: 050, 0592, 0598, 0599
- Website: www.aaenhunze.nl

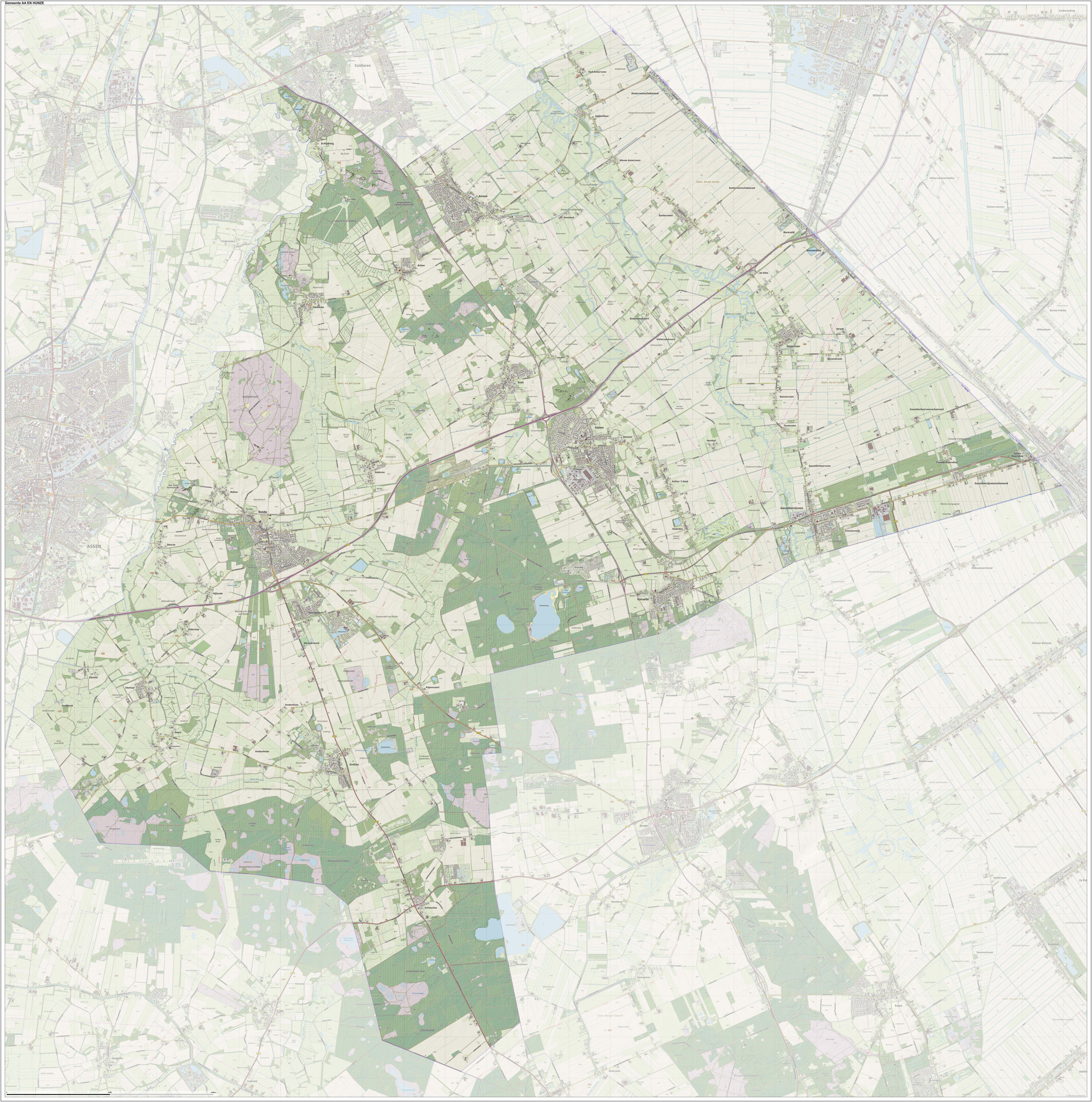
Topographic map of Aa en Hunze, June 2015

Aa en Hunze (Dutch pronunciation: [ˌaː ʔɛn ˈɦʏnzə]) is a municipality in the northeastern Netherlands. The municipality has 26,089 inhabitants. The town hall is located in Gieten. The municipality of Aa en Hunze was created on 1 January 1998 by merging the municipalities of Rolde, Gasselte, Gieten, and Anloo.

The names 'Aa' (more precisely the 'Drentsche Aa') and 'Hunze' refer to two small rivers through the municipality. The municipality consists of two distinct parts, each with a different history. The two parts are separated by the Hondsrug, which itself belongs to the western part. This sandy area is among the oldest inhabited regions in the Netherlands. The eastern part of the municipality has a much shorter history of habitation.

== Population centres ==
- Achter 't Hout
- Amen
- Anderen
- Anloo
- Annen
- Annerveenschekanaal
- Balloërveld
- Balloo
- Bareveld
- Bonnen
- Bonnerveen
- Bosje
- Bovenstreek
- De Hilte
- Deurze
- Eext
- Eexterveen
- Eexterveenschekanaal
- Eexterzandvoort
- Ekehaar
- Eldersloo
- Eleveld
- Gasselte
- Gasselterboerveen
- Gasselterboerveenschemond
- Gasselternijveen
- Gasselternijveenschemond 1e Dwarsdiep
- Gasselternijveenschemond 2e Dwarsdiep
- Gasteren
- Geelbroek
- Gieten
- Gieterveen
- Gieterzandvoort
- Grolloo
- Kostvlies
- Marwijksoord
- Nieuw-Annerveen
- Nieuwediep
- Nijlande
- Nooitgedacht
- Oud-Annerveen
- Papenvoort
- Rolde
- Schipborg
- Schoonloo
- Schreierswijk
- Spijkerboor
- Streek
- Torenveen
- Veenhof
- Vredenheim

== Transportation ==
There is no railway station in the municipality. The nearest station is Assen railway station.

=== Bus services ===
- 21: Assen - Deurze - Rolde - Grolloo - Schoonloo - Emmen
- 24: Assen - Deurze - Rolde - Papenvoort - Borger - Buinen - Buinerveen - Nieuw-Buinen - Stadskanaal
- 59: Emmen - Borger - Gasselte - Gieten
- Buurtbus 93: Gieten - De Hilte - Eexterveen - Annerveen - Spijkerboor - Annen - Spijkerboor - Zuidlaren
- Buurtbus 94: Gieten - De Hilte - Gieterveen - Bonnerveen - Gasselterboerveen - Gasselternijveen - Drouwenerveen - Drouwenermond - Stadskanaal
- 110: Assen - Deurze - Rolde - Gieten - De Hilte - Bareveld - Veendam
- Qliner 300: Groningen - Gieten - Borger - Emmen (express)
- Qliner 312: Groningen - Gieten - Gasselte - Gasselternijveen - Stadskanaal (express)

== Notable people ==
- Harm Brouwer (born 1957) politician
- Hessel de Vries (1916–1959) physicist concerned with radiocarbon dating, also a murderer
- Jan Dijkema (born 1944) politician, sociologist and sports director
- Gerrit Oosting (1941–2012) politician

=== Sport ===
- Berden de Vries (born 1989) racing cyclist and former speed skater
- Janneke Ensing (born 1986) cyclist
- Arnold van Calker (born 1976) bobsledder
- Edwin van Calker (born 1979) bobsledder
- Alida van der Anker-Doedens (1922–2014) sprint canoeist, competed in two Summer Olympics
- Jordi Hoogstrate (born 1983) footballer

== Gallery ==
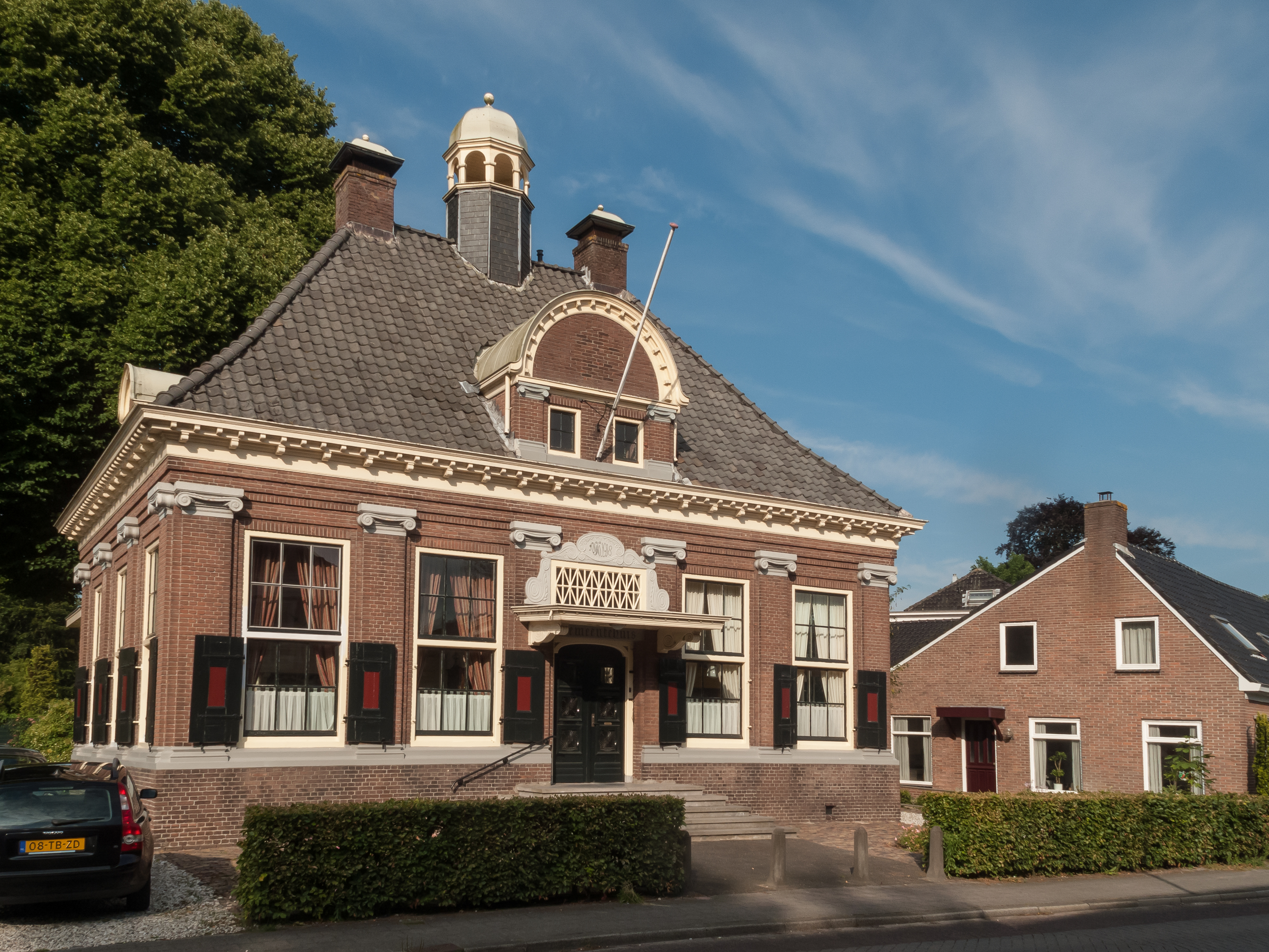
Rolde, former townhall

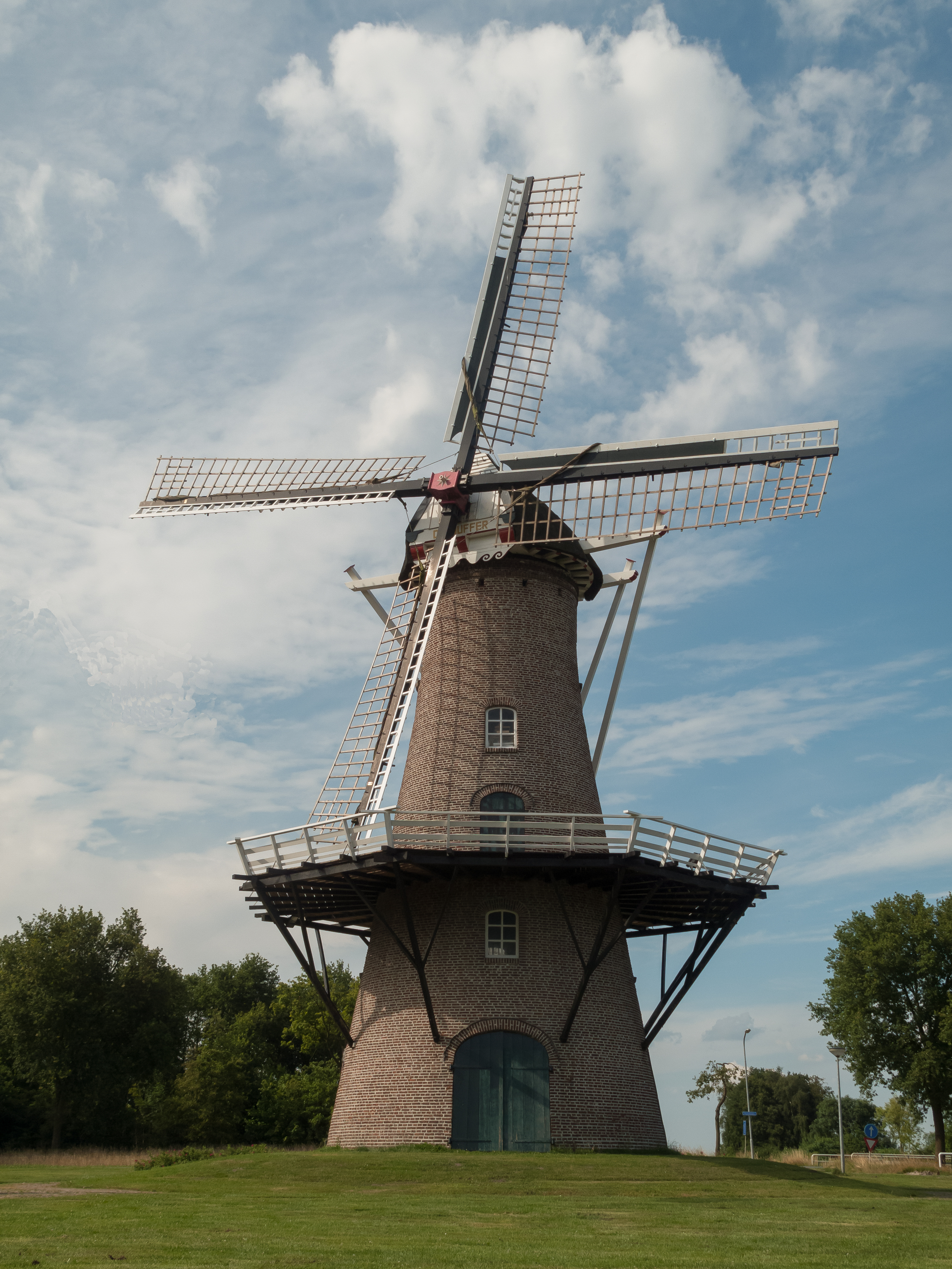
Windmill between Gasselternijveeen and Gasselte

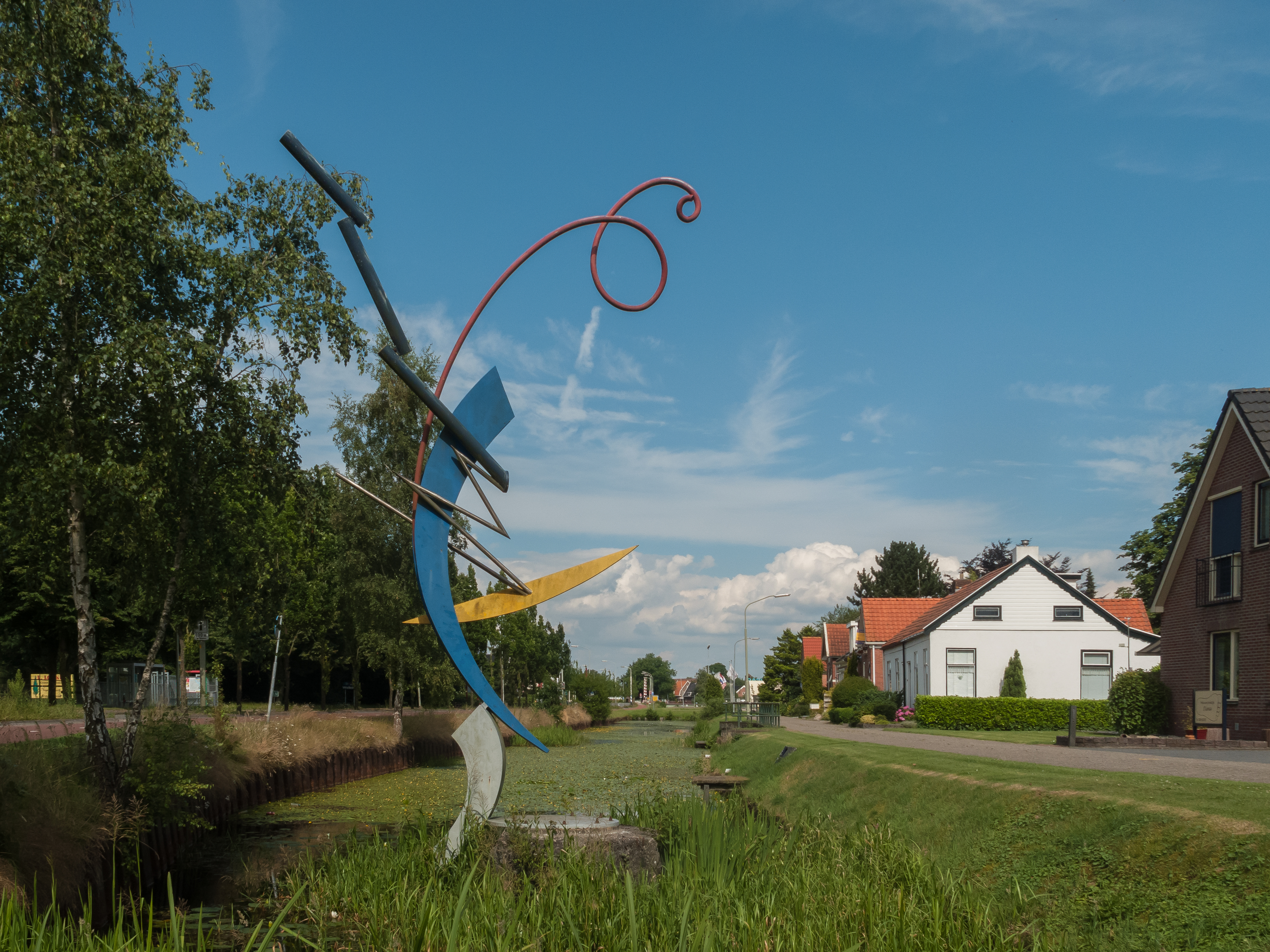
Gasselternijveenschemond

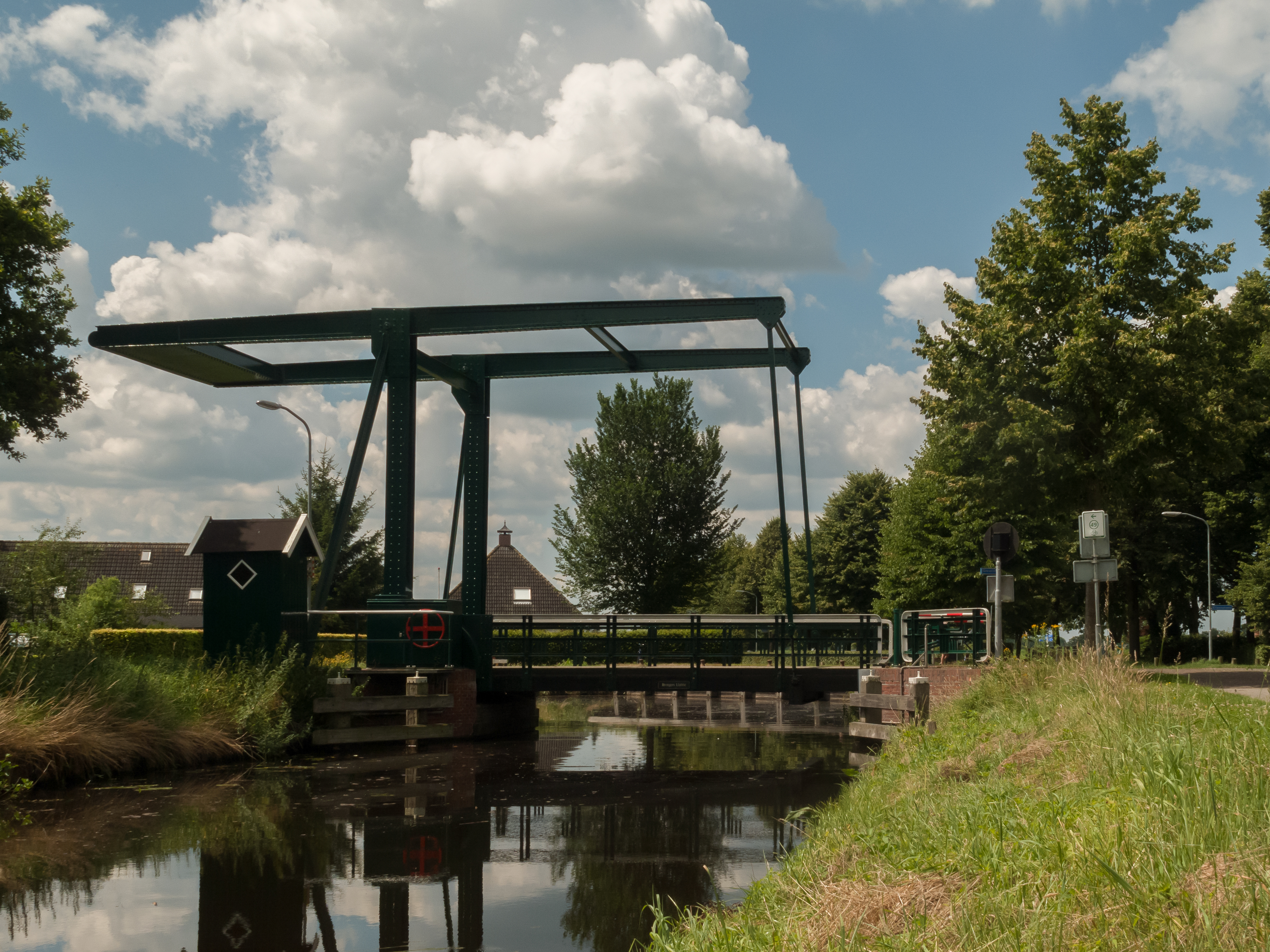
Annerveenschekanaal, drawing bridge

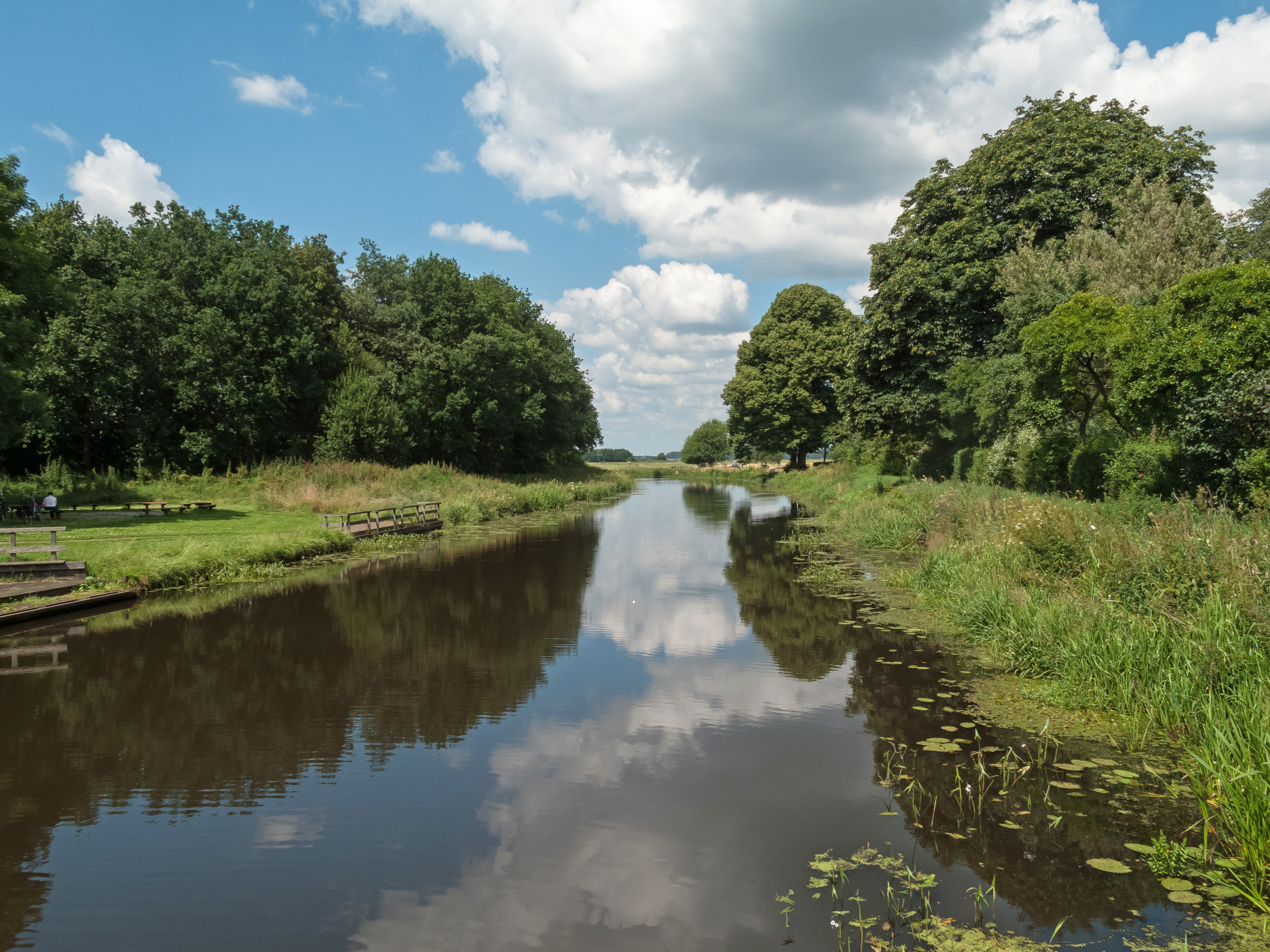
Near Spijkerboor, river: de Hunze or de Oostermoerse Vaart
