= Bonnerveen =

- Hamlet
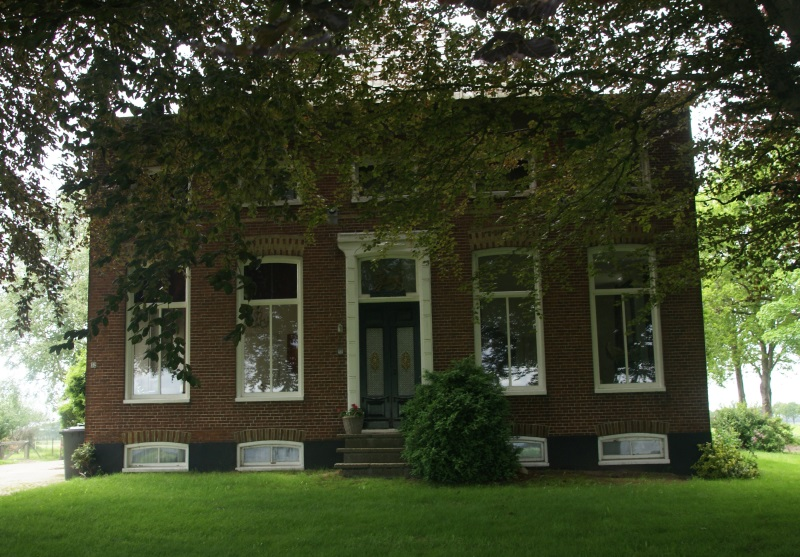
- Building in Bonnerveen

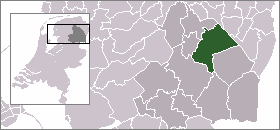

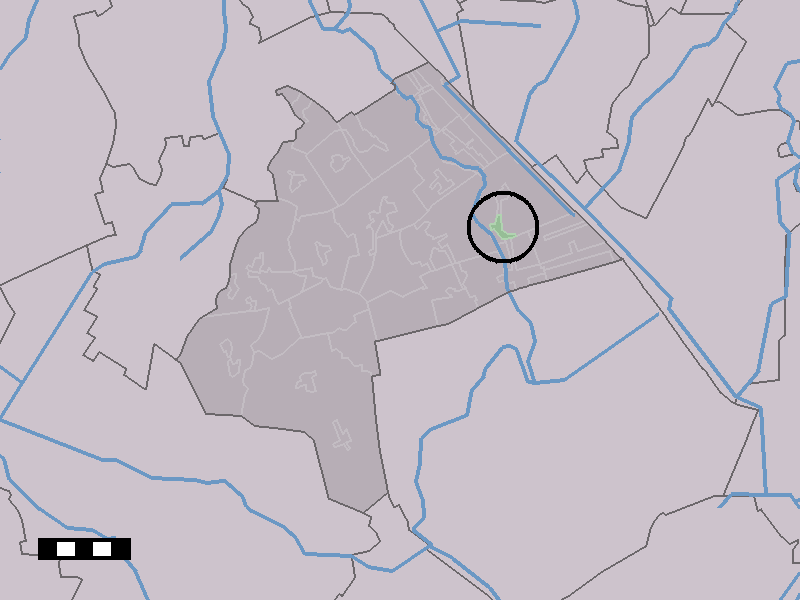
- Bonnerveen in the municipality of Aa en Hunze.
- Coordinates: 53°0′41″N 6°49′55″E
- Country: Netherlands
- Province: Drenthe
- Municipality: Aa en Hunze

Population (1 January 2005)
  - Total: 100
- Time zone: UTC+1 (CET)
  - Summer (DST): UTC+2 (CEST)

Bonnerveen is a hamlet in the Dutch province of Drenthe. It is a part of the municipality of Aa en Hunze, and lies about 18 km east of Assen.

The statistical area "Bonnerveen", which can also include the surrounding countryside, has a population of around 100.
