= Eexterveenschekanaal =

- Village
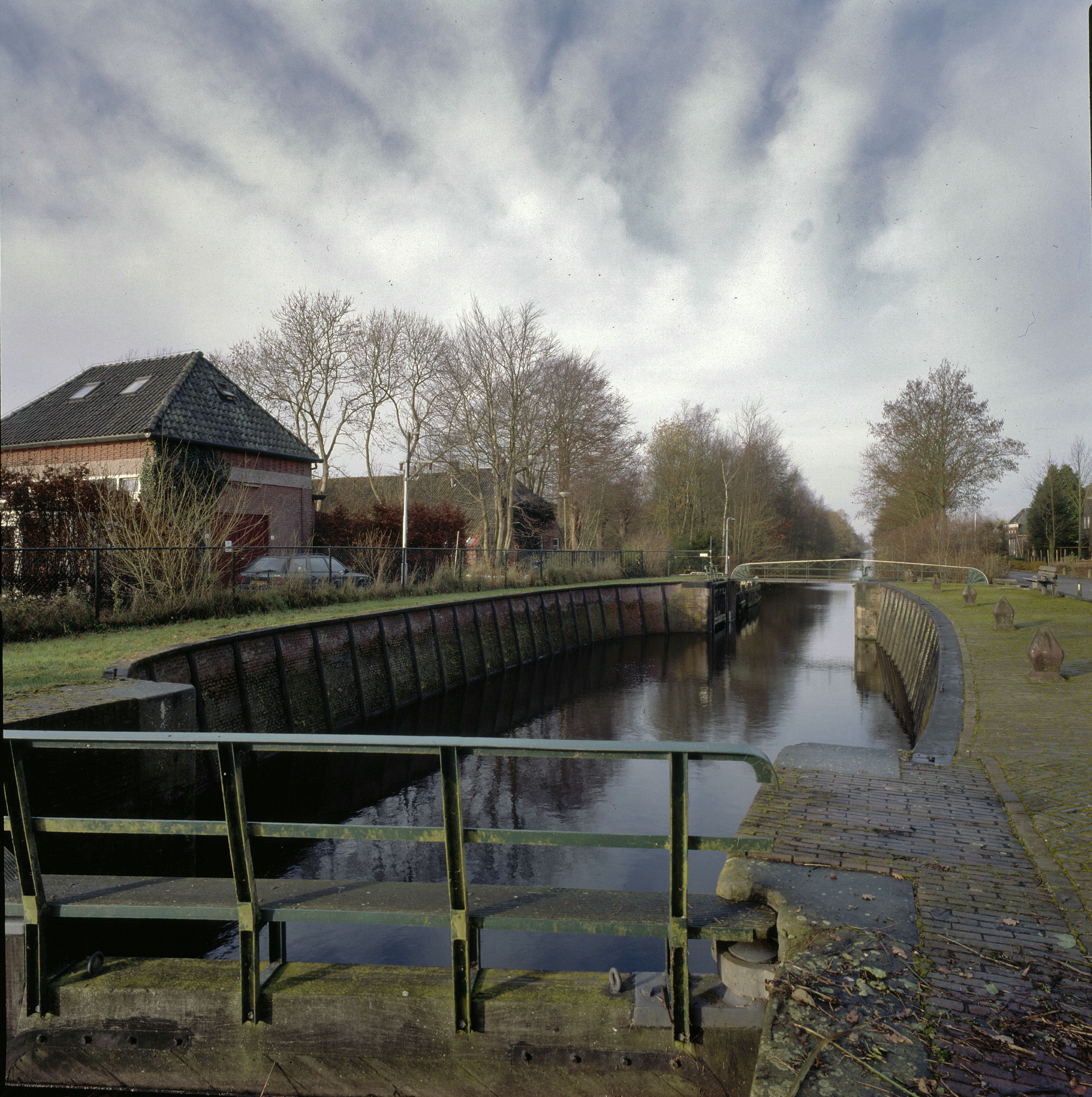
- Sluice in Eexterveenschekanaal

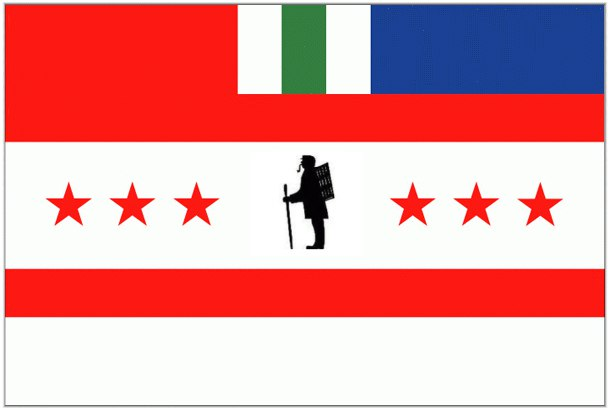
- Flag

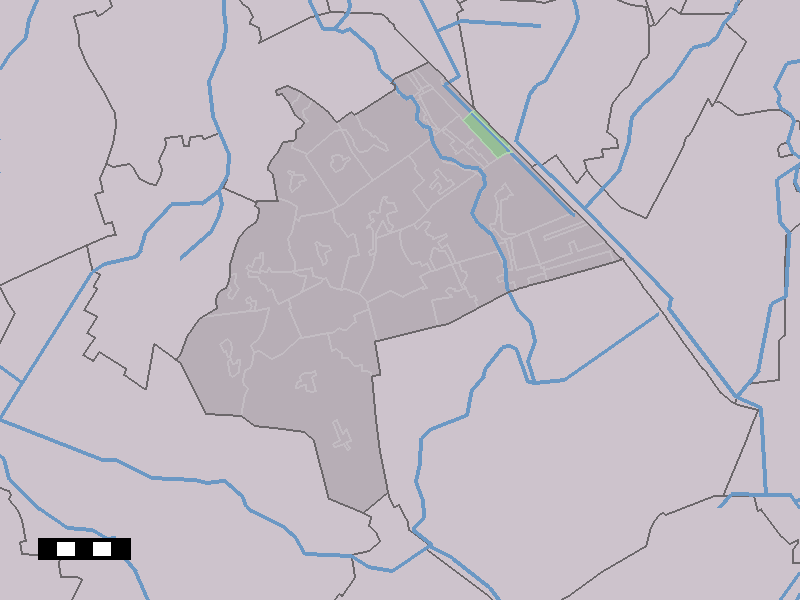
- Eexterveenschekanaal in the municipality of Aa en Hunze.

- Location in the Netherlands Eexterveenschekanaal (Netherlands)
- Coordinates: 53°3′48″N 6°49′25″E
- Country: Netherlands
- Province: Drenthe
- Municipality: Aa en Hunze

Area
  - Total: 12.27 km^{2} (4.74 sq mi)
- Elevation: 2.8 m (9.2 ft)

Population (2021)
  - Total: 225
  - Density: 18.3/km^{2} (47.5/sq mi)
- Time zone: UTC+1 (CET)
  - Summer (DST): UTC+2 (CEST)
- Postal code: 9512 & 9659
- Dialing code: 0598

Eexterveenschekanaal is a village in the Dutch province of Drenthe. It is a part of the municipality of Aa en Hunze, and lies about 19 km east of Assen.

== History ==
The village was first mentioned in 1899 as "Eexterveensche kanaal of Eexterveensche Compagnie", and means "canal of the peat excavation of Eext". It is used both for the village and the canal. Between 1771 and 1775, the canal was dug by the Annerveensche Heeren Compagnie to exploit the peat in the area. The canal is parallel to the border with the Province of Groningen. In 1812, S.M.S. de Ranitz, becomes the new owner of the company and the focus shifted from peat excavation to selling little parcels of farm land with real estate.

In 1872, connections were made to the canals at Wildervank and Stadskanaal. The potato starch factory "Wildervank e.o" was built in Eexterveenschekanaal in 1903.

== Gallery ==
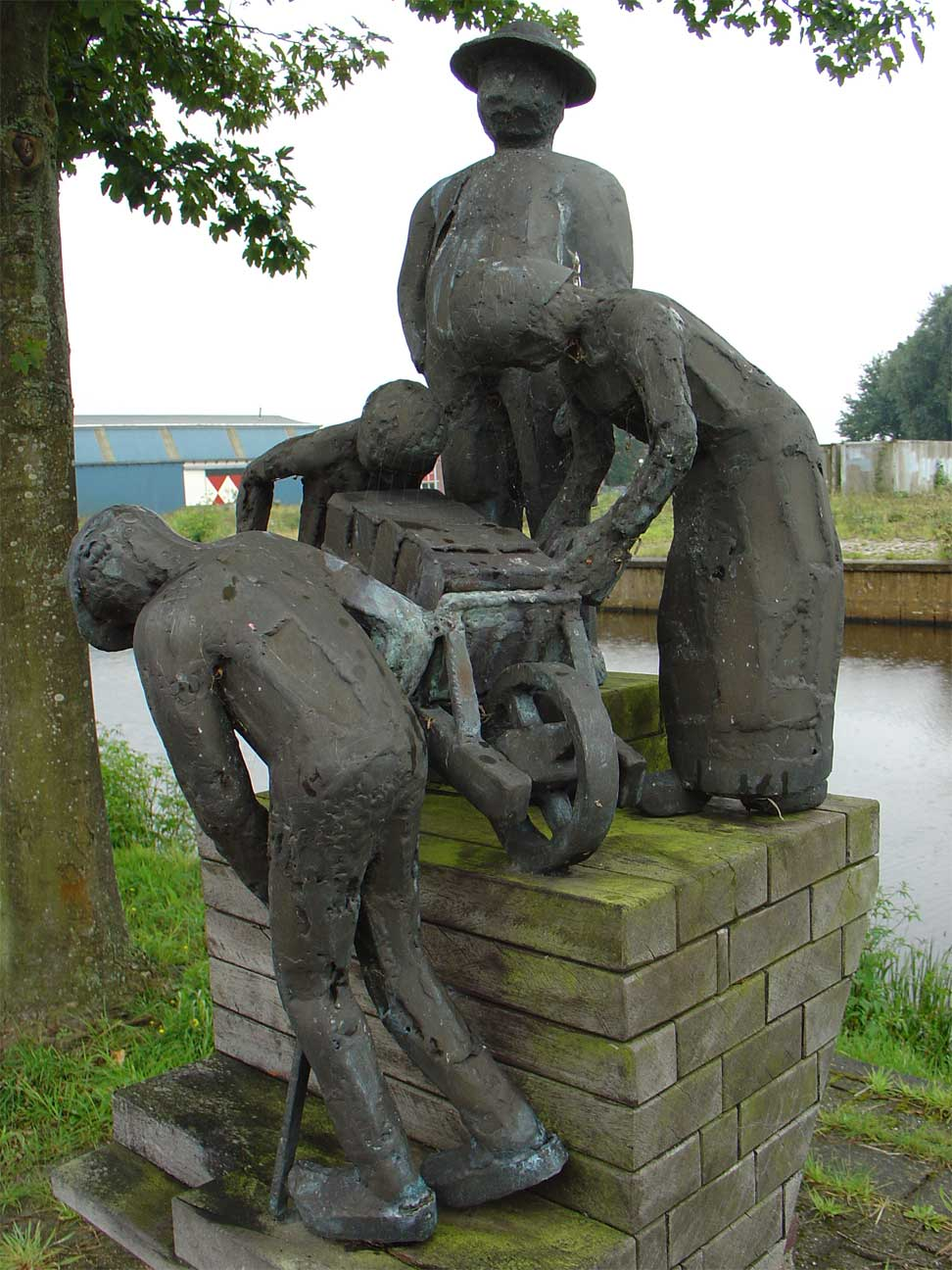
Peat workers statue

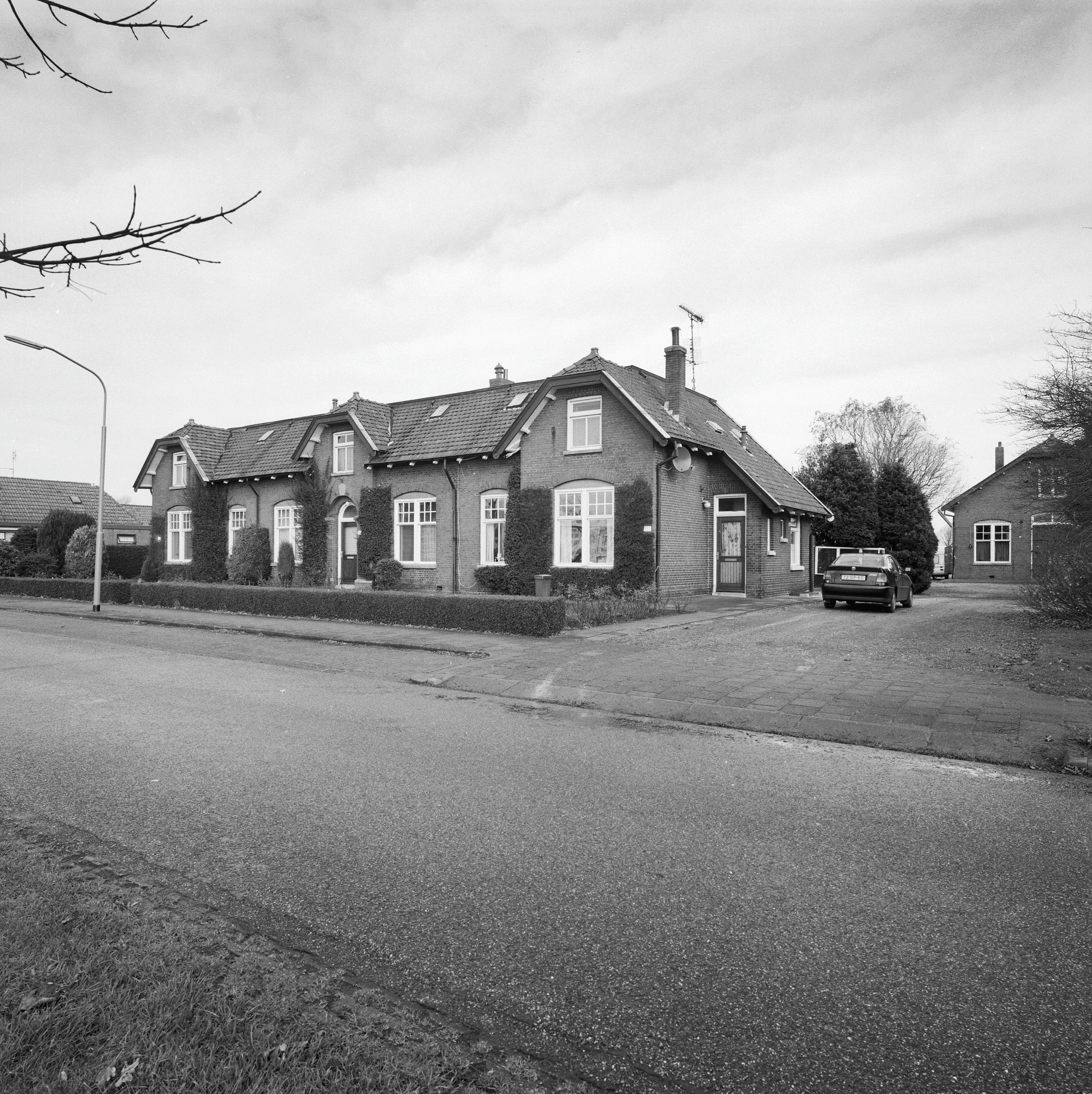
Three former police officer's houses
