= Gasselterboerveenschemond =

- Town
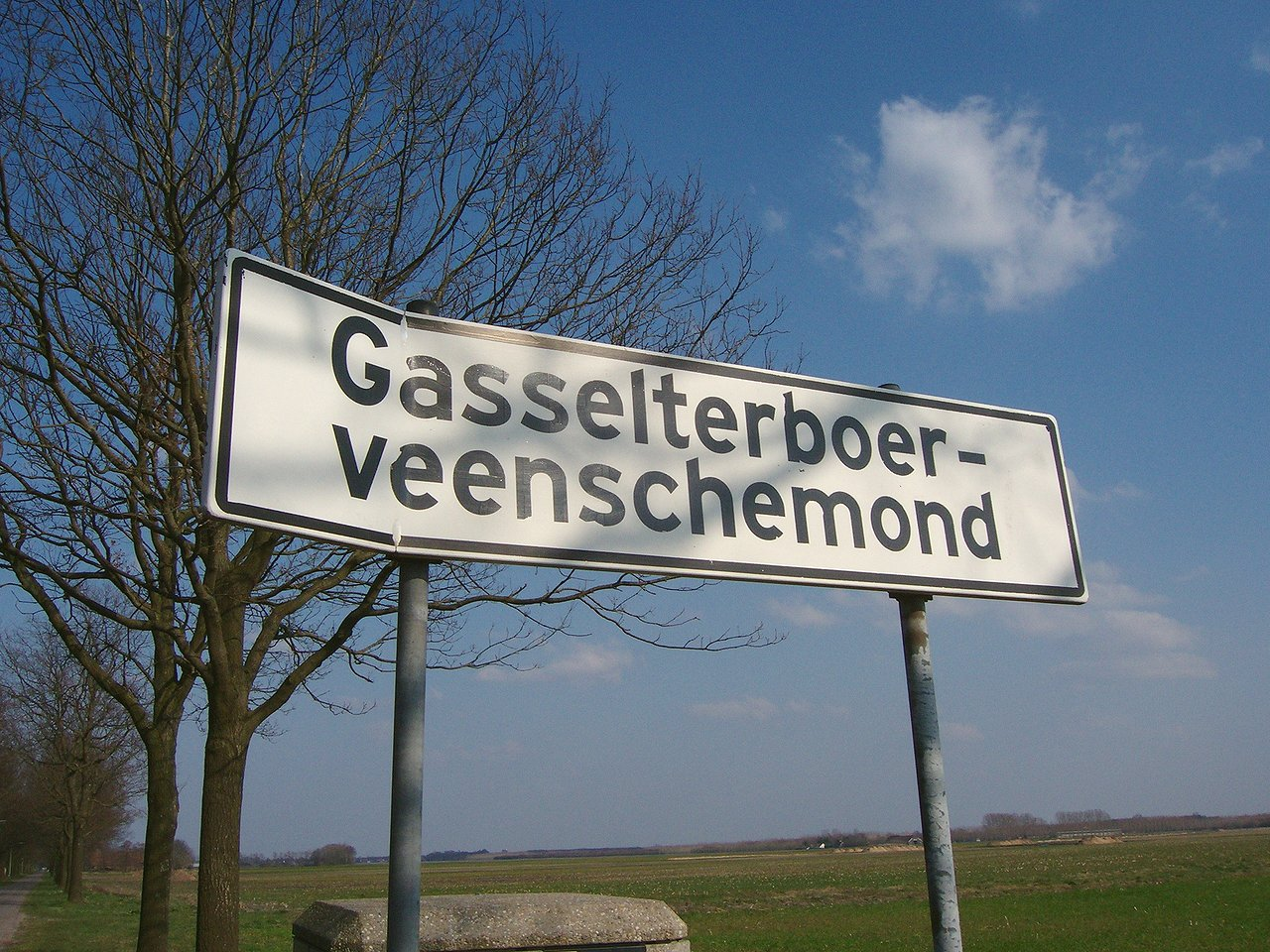
- Gasselterboerveenschemond

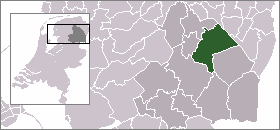

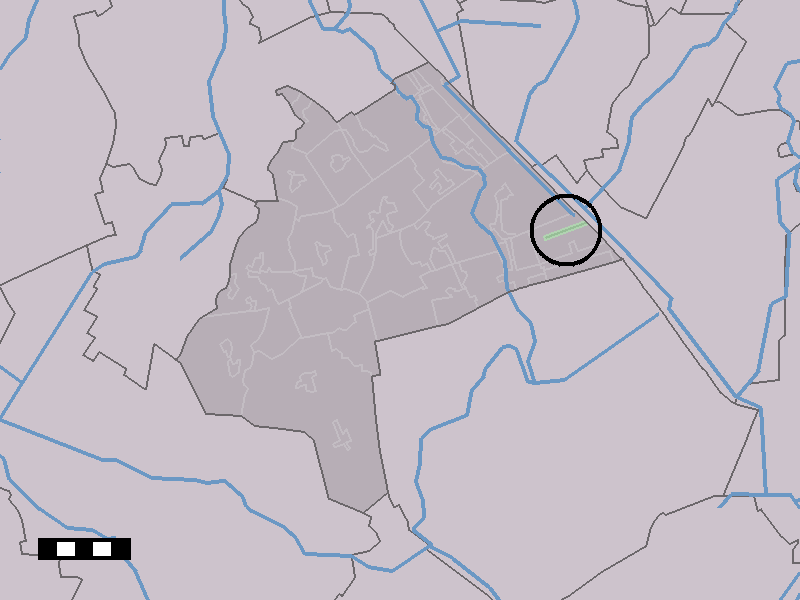
- Gasselterboerveenschemond in the municipality of Aa en Hunze.
- Coordinates: 53°0′25″N 6°51′10″E
- Country: Netherlands
- Province: Drenthe
- Municipality: Aa en Hunze

Population
  - Total: 40
- Time zone: UTC+1 (CET)
  - Summer (DST): UTC+2 (CEST)

Gasselterboerveenschemond is a hamlet in the Dutch province of Drenthe. It is a part of the municipality of Aa en Hunze, and lies about 21 km east of Assen.

It is the longest placename of the Netherlands that is written as one word. With 25 characters it is just one character larger than Gasselternijveenschemond, which lies a few kilometres from Gasselterboerveenschemond.

The statistical area "Gasselterboerveenschemond", which also includes the surrounding countryside, has a population of around 40.

On 18 July 2011 there was a huge fire in the only chicken farm of Gasselterboerveenschemond, in which 170,000 chickens died.
