= Nijlande =

- Hamlet
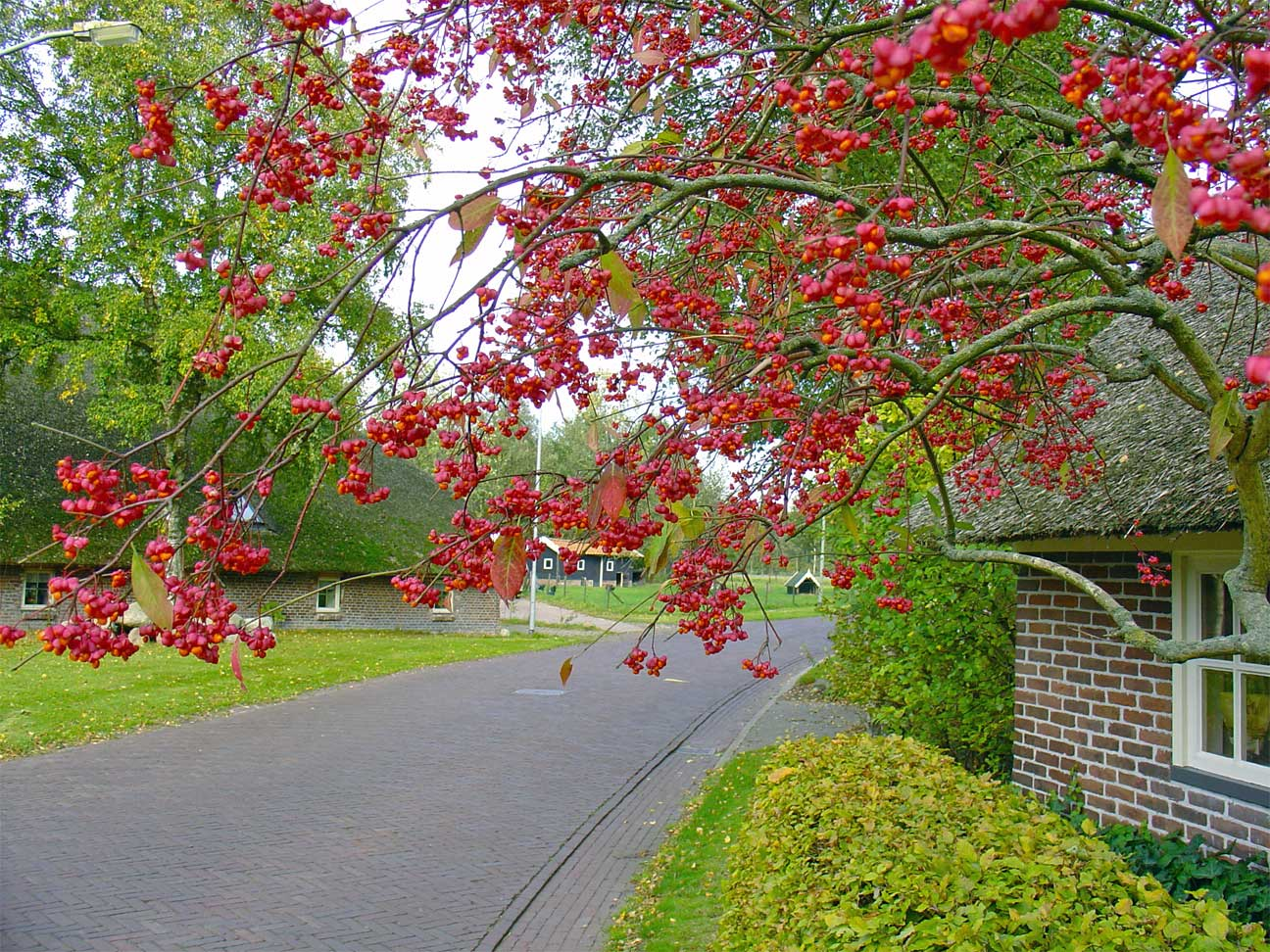
- Nijlande (dorpsgezicht)

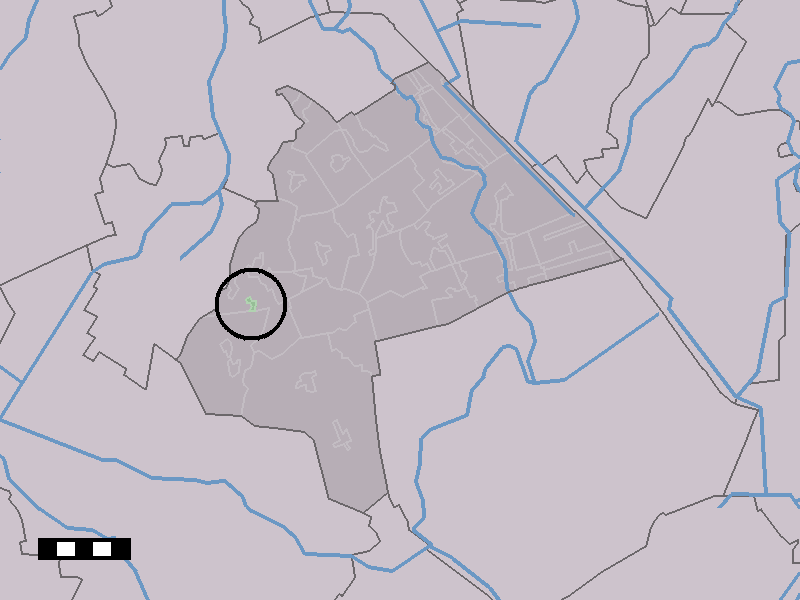
- Nijlande in the municipality of Aa en Hunze.

- Location in the Netherlands Nijlande (Netherlands)
- Coordinates: 52°58′26″N 6°37′34″E
- Country: Netherlands
- Province: Drenthe
- Municipality: Aa en Hunze

Area
  - Total: 0.23 km^{2} (0.089 sq mi)
- Elevation: 14 m (46 ft)

Population (2021)
  - Total: 65
  - Density: 280/km^{2} (730/sq mi)
- Time zone: UTC+1 (CET)
  - Summer (DST): UTC+2 (CEST)
- Postal code: 9452
- Dialing code: 0592

Nijlande is a hamlet in the Dutch province of Drenthe. It is a part of the municipality of Aa en Hunze, and lies about 6 km southeast of Assen. The area "Nijlande", which also includes the nearby countryside, has a population of around 60.

The hamlet was first mentioned in 1634 as Nyelande, and means "new land". Nijlande is an esdorp which developed on cultivated land as a satellite of Rolde. Nijlande was home to 51 people in 1840.

== Gallery ==
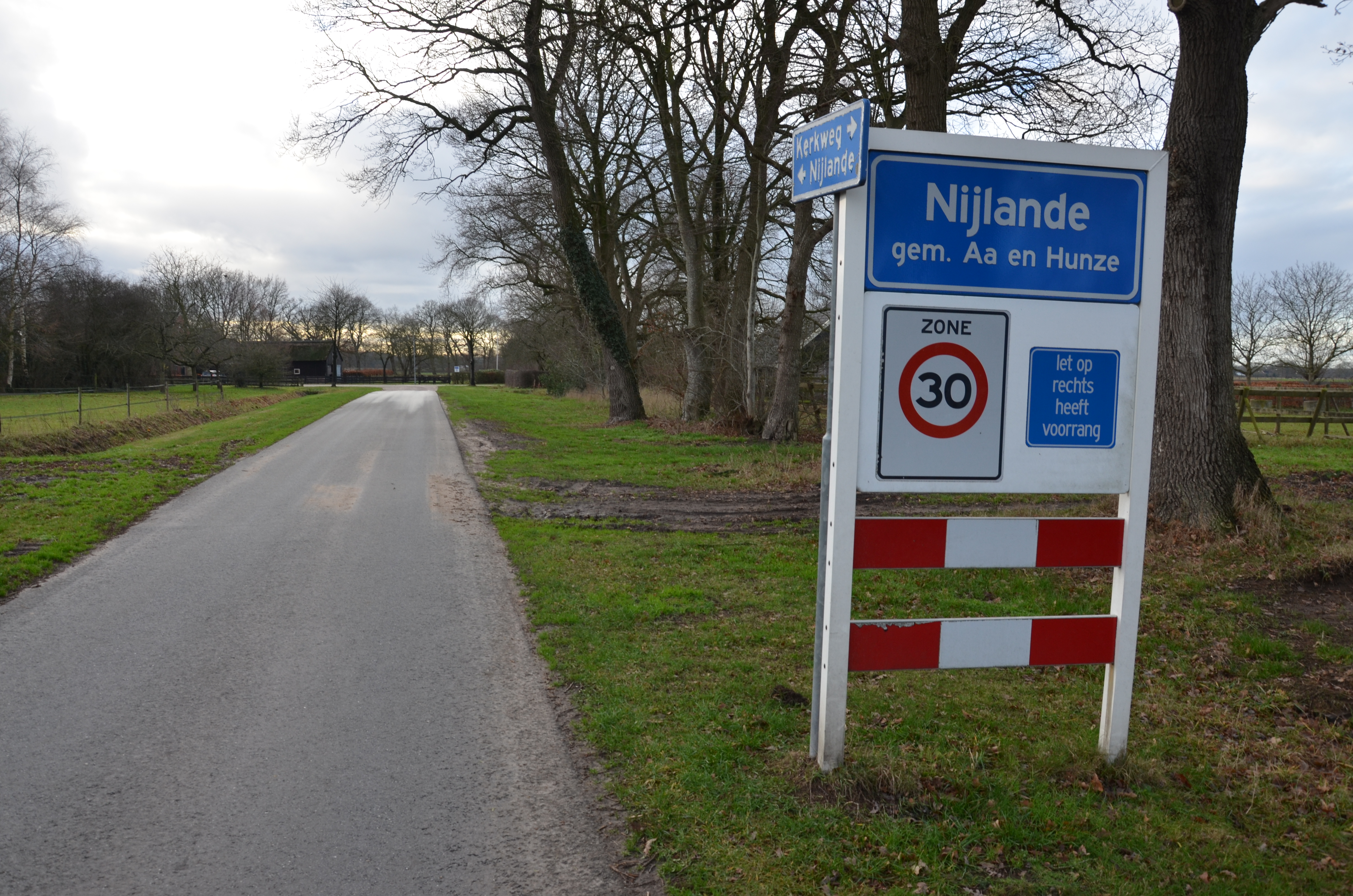
Place name signs

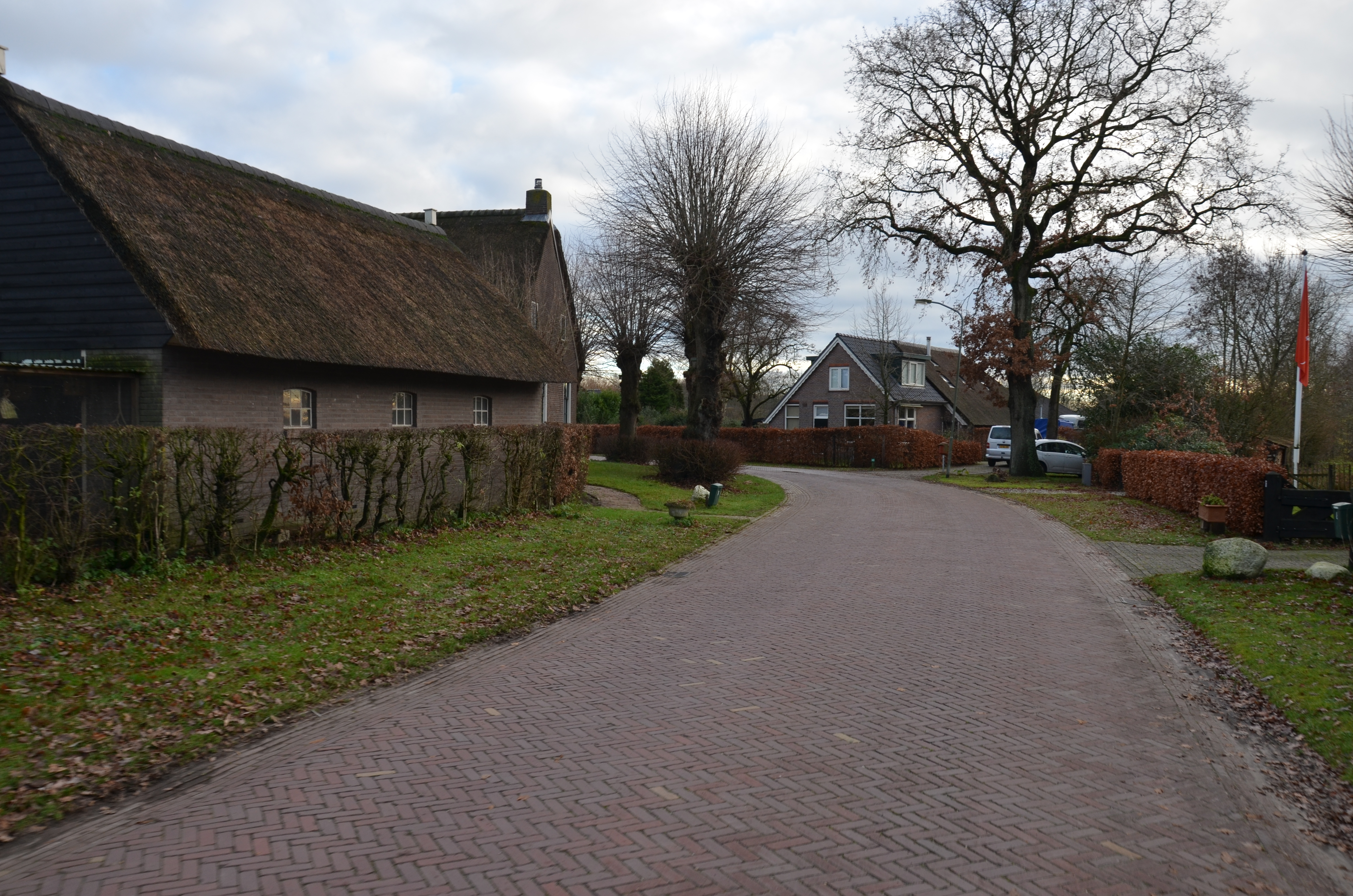
Farm in Nijlande

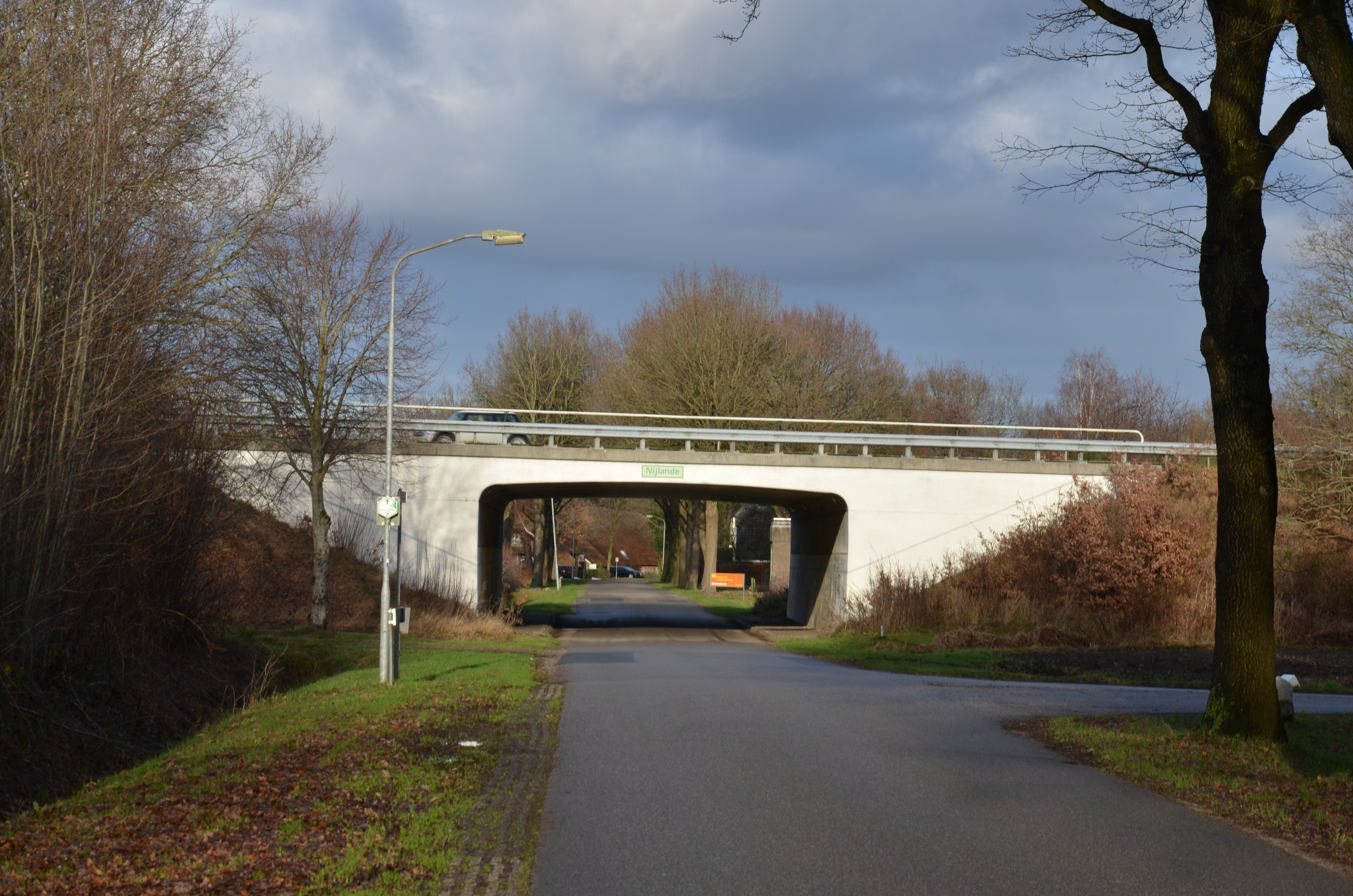
Underpass in Nijlande
