= Papenvoort, Drenthe =

Papenvoort
- Village
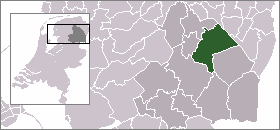

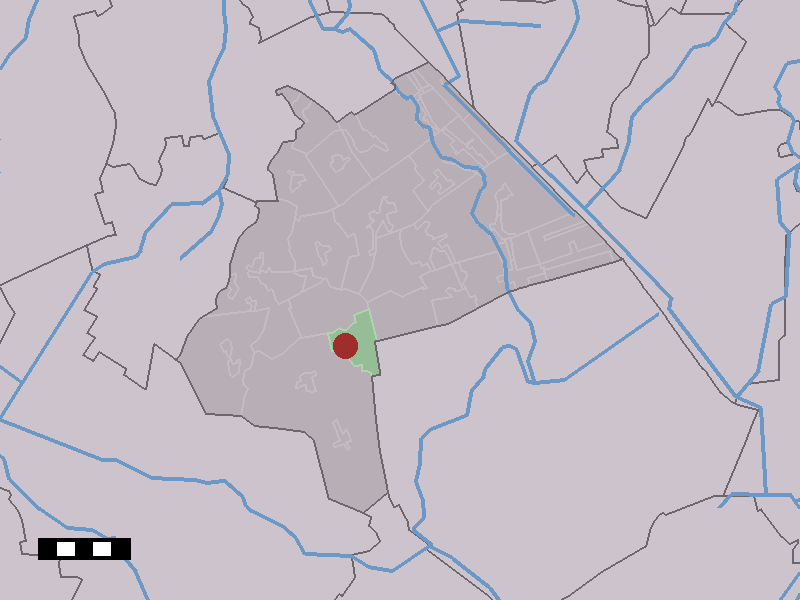
- The village (dark red) and the statistical district (light green) of Papenvoort in the municipality of Aa en Hunze.
- Coordinates: 52°57′1″N 6°42′18″E
- Country: Netherlands
- Province: Drenthe
- Municipality: Aa en Hunze

Population (1 January 2008)
  - Total: 48
- Time zone: UTC+1 (CET)
  - Summer (DST): UTC+2 (CEST)
- Postal code: 9447
- Dialing code: 0592

Papenvoort is a village in the Dutch province of Drenthe. It is a part of the municipality of Aa en Hunze, and lies about 11 km southeast of Assen.

The statistical area "Papenvoort", which can also include the surrounding countryside, has a population of around 60.
