= Anderen =

- Village
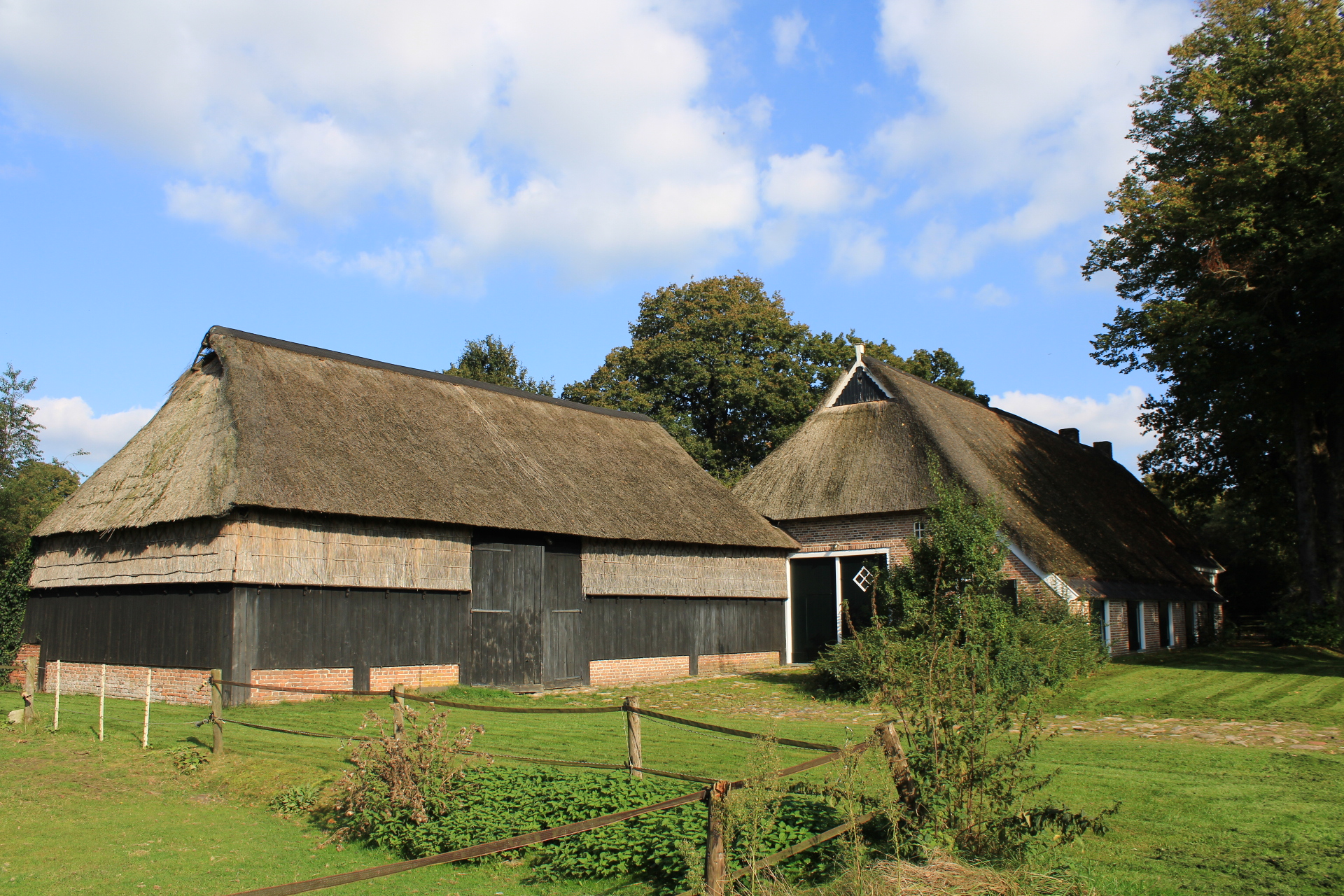
- Farm in Anderen

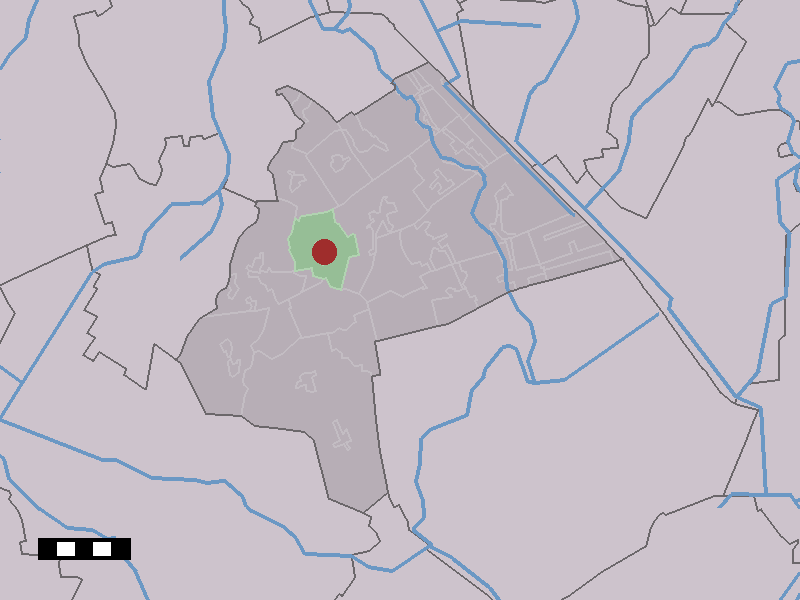
- The village (dark red) and the statistical district (light green) of Anderen in the municipality of Aa en Hunze.

- Location in the Netherlands Anderen (Netherlands)
- Coordinates: 53°0′1″N 6°41′8″E
- Country: Netherlands
- Province: Drenthe
- Municipality: Aa en Hunze

Area
  - Total: 11.06 km^{2} (4.27 sq mi)
- Elevation: 12 m (39 ft)

Population (2021)
  - Total: 265
  - Density: 24.0/km^{2} (62.1/sq mi)
- Time zone: UTC+1 (CET)
  - Summer (DST): UTC+2 (CEST)
- Postal code: 9465
- Dialing code: 0592

Anderen is a village in the Dutch province of Drenthe. It is a part of the municipality of Aa en Hunze, and lies about 8 km east of Assen.

The village was first mentioned in 1217 as Anderne. The etymology is unknown. Anderen is an esdorp without a church which developed in the Early Middle Ages on the Hondsrug.

Anderen was home to 121 people in 1840.

== Transportation ==
There is no railway station here. The nearest station is Assen station. There are no bus services either, but bus services 10 and 28 stop 1 km south of Anderen on the road cbs.

For further information see Aa en Hunze#Transportation.

== Gallery ==
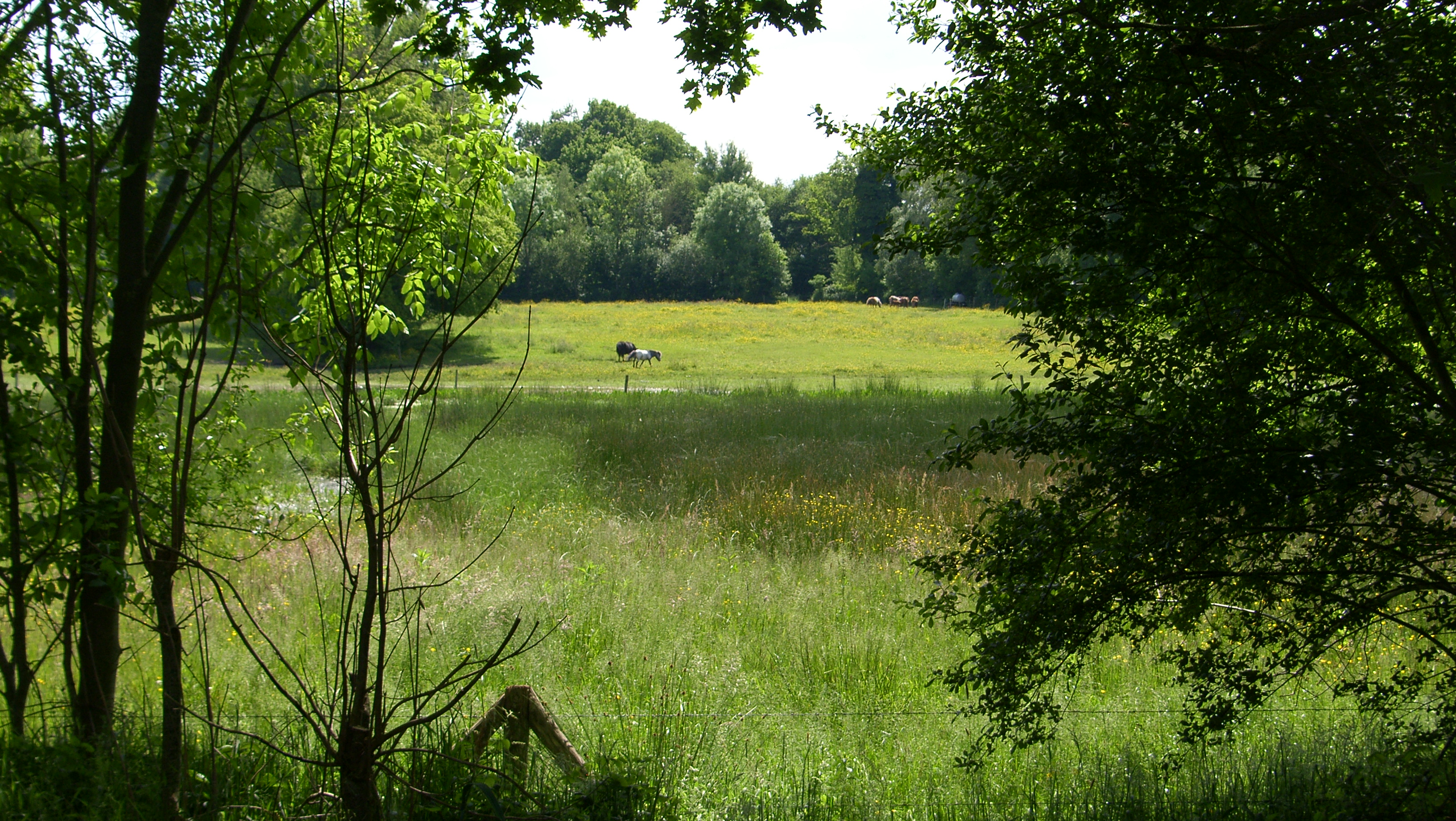
Countryside near Anderen

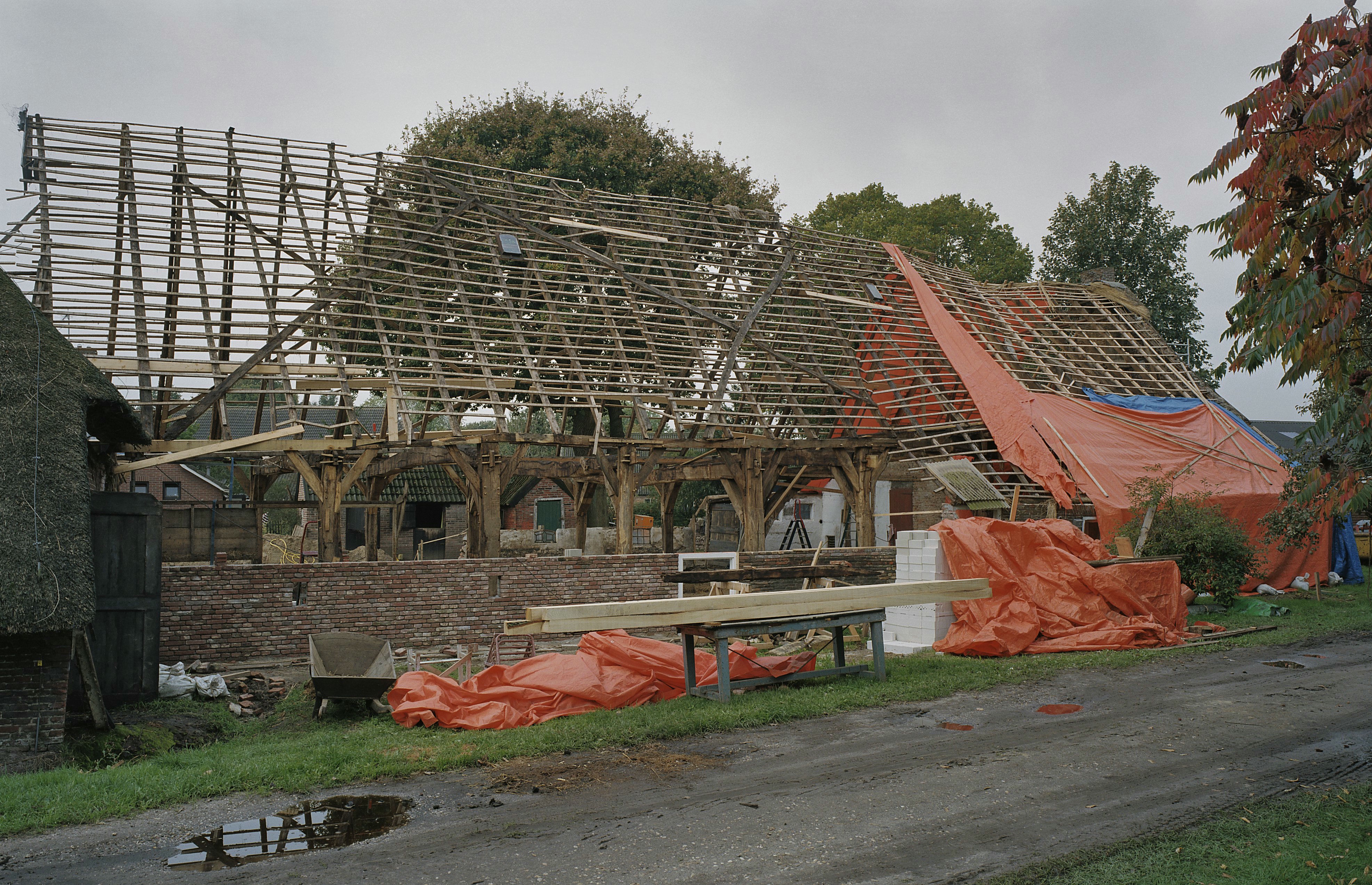
Restoration of a farm
