= Gasteren =

- Village
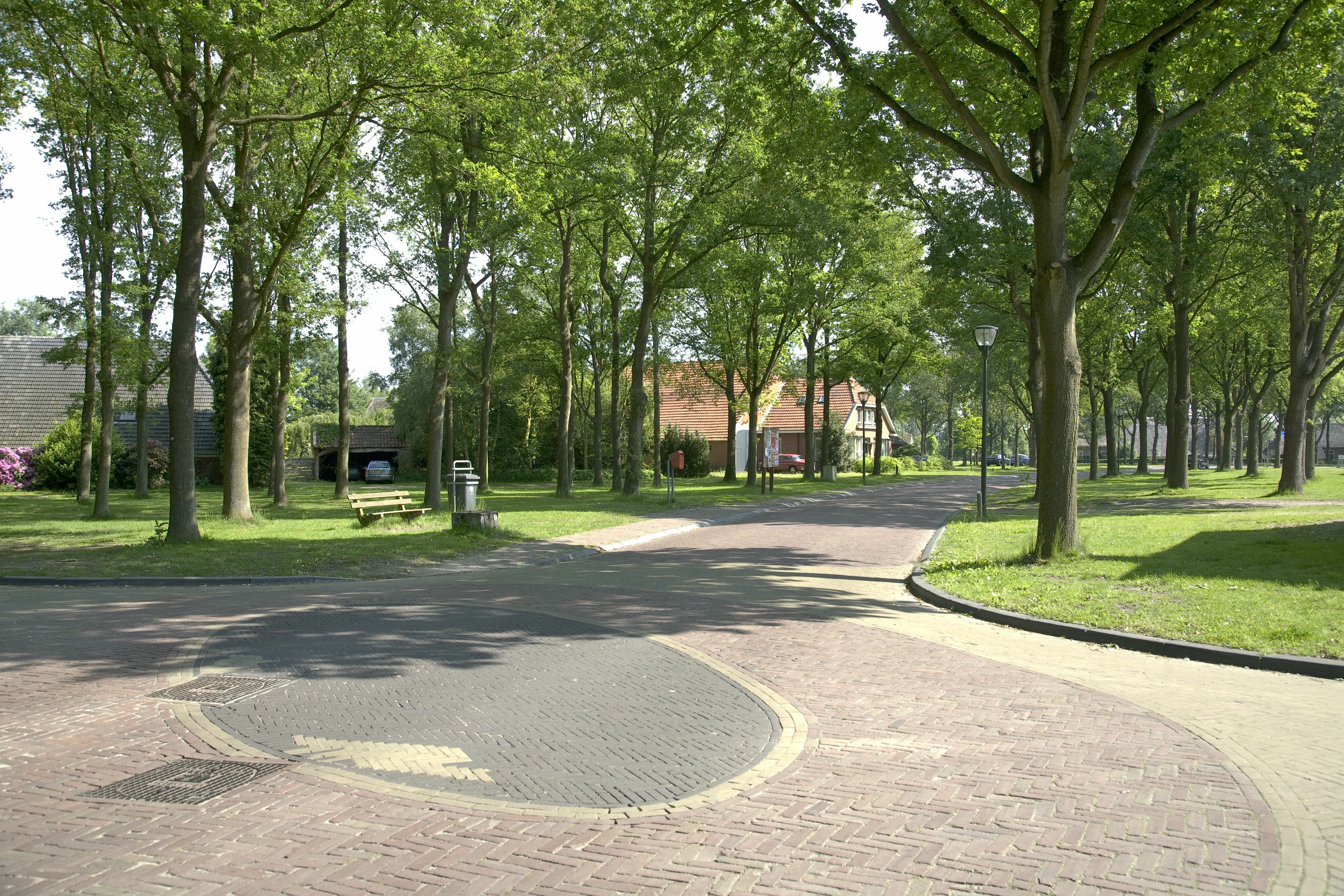
- The village green of Gasteren

- Flag

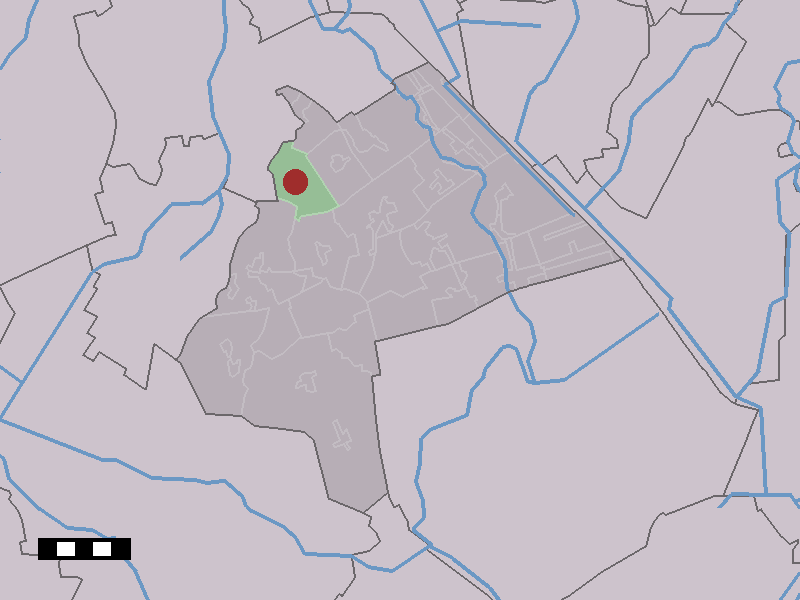
- The village (dark red) and the statistical district (light green) of Gasteren in the municipality of Aa en Hunze.

- Location in the Netherlands Gasteren (Netherlands)
- Coordinates: 53°2′10″N 6°39′48″E
- Country: Netherlands
- Province: Drenthe
- Municipality: Aa en Hunze

Area
  - Total: 9.14 km^{2} (3.53 sq mi)
- Elevation: 10 m (33 ft)

Population (2021)
  - Total: 400
  - Density: 44/km^{2} (110/sq mi)
- Time zone: UTC+1 (CET)
  - Summer (DST): UTC+2 (CEST)
- Postal code: 9466
- Dialing code: 0592

Gasteren is a village in the Dutch province of Drenthe. It is a part of the municipality of Aa en Hunze, and lies about 8 km east of Assen.

The village was first mentioned between 1298 and 1304 as "in villa Ghestre, apud Ghesteren". The etymology is unclear.

The hunebed (dolmen) D11 is a small incomplete dolmen. It has been fenced off because, there are sheep in the heath. It used to have four capstones, but only two have remained. There are also 44 burial mounds around the village.

Gasteren was home to 155 people in 1840.

== Gallery ==
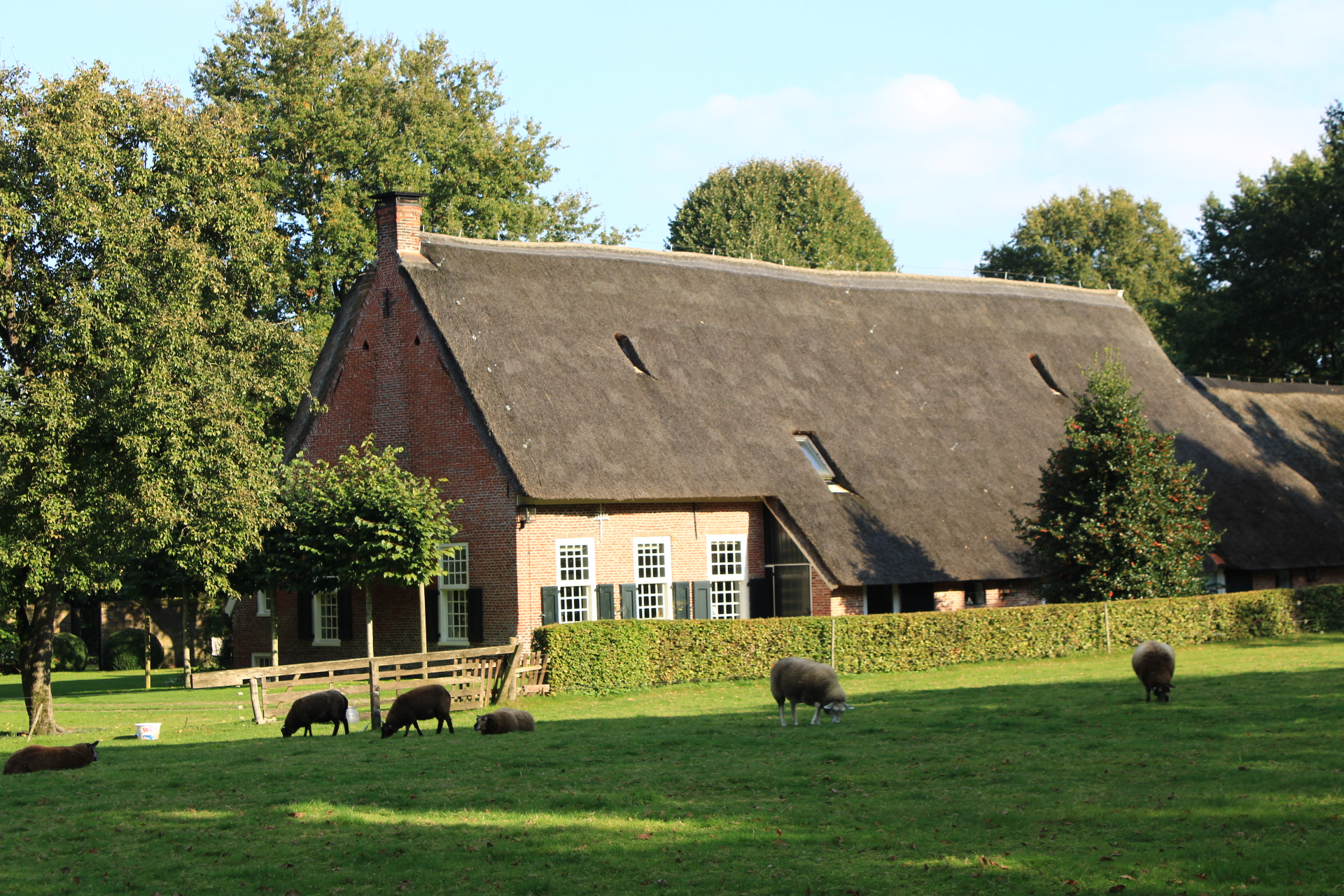
Farm in Gasteren

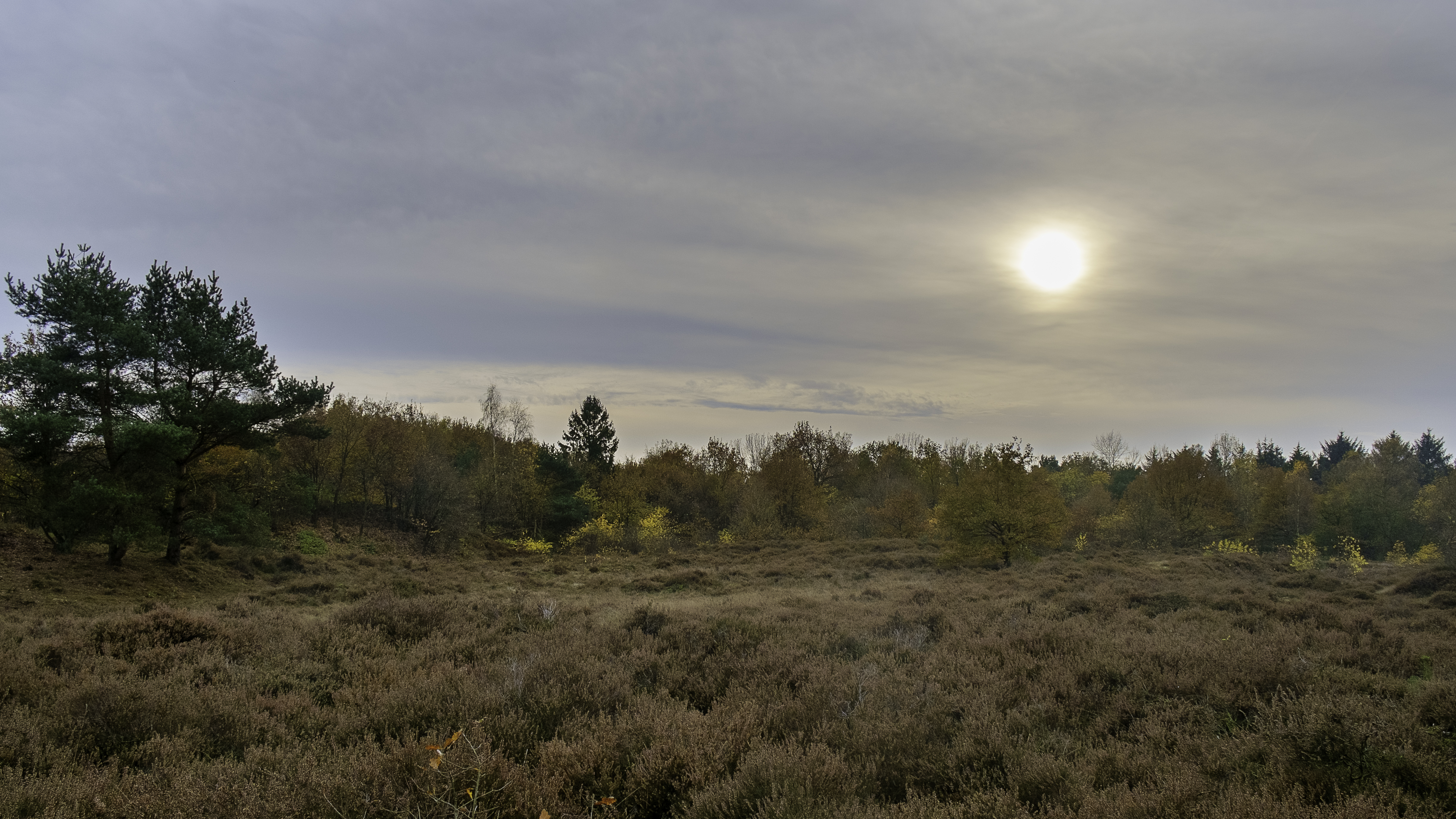
Gasterse Dunes

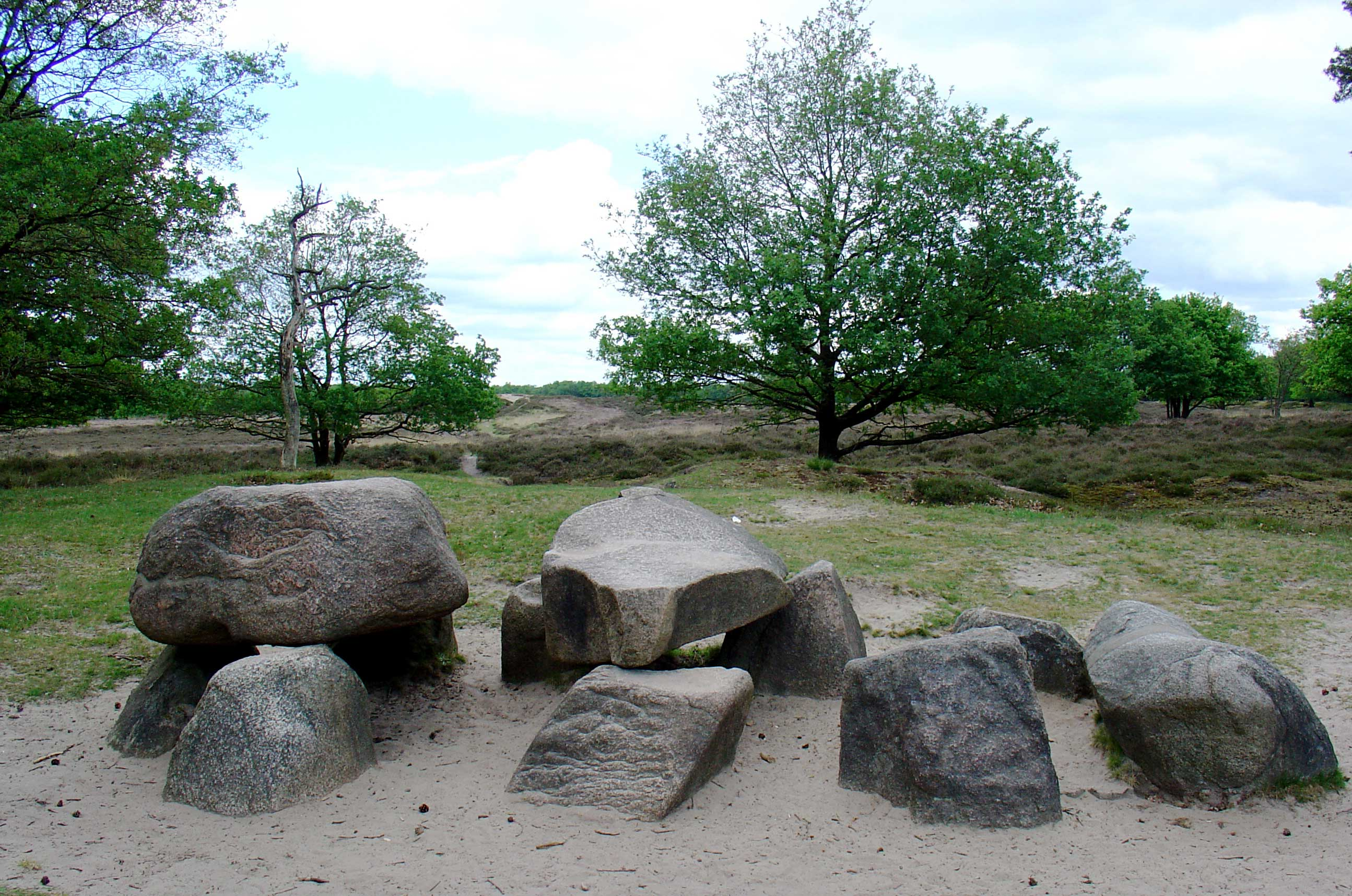
Dolmen D10 near Gasteren
