= Klaas Veenhof =

Dutch assyrioloigst (1935–2023)

Klaas Roelof Veenhof (9 November 1935 – 28 July 2023) was a Dutch Assyriologist and professor at the University of Leiden. He specialized in the Old-Babylonian time and the Old-Assyrian trade colonies such as Kanesh.

Veenhof died on 28 July 2023, at the age of 87.

== Selected bibliography ==
- Altassyrische Tontafeln aus Kultepe Berlin: Mann (1992 ISBN 3-7861-1668-7)
- Geschichte des Alten Orients bis zur Zeit Alexanders des Grossen Göttingen: Vandenhoeck & Ruprecht (2001 ISBN 3-525-51685-1)
- The Old Assyrian list of year eponyms from Karum Kanish and its chronological implications Ankara : Turkish Historical Society (2003 ISBN 975-16-1546-1)
