= Eexterveen =

- Village
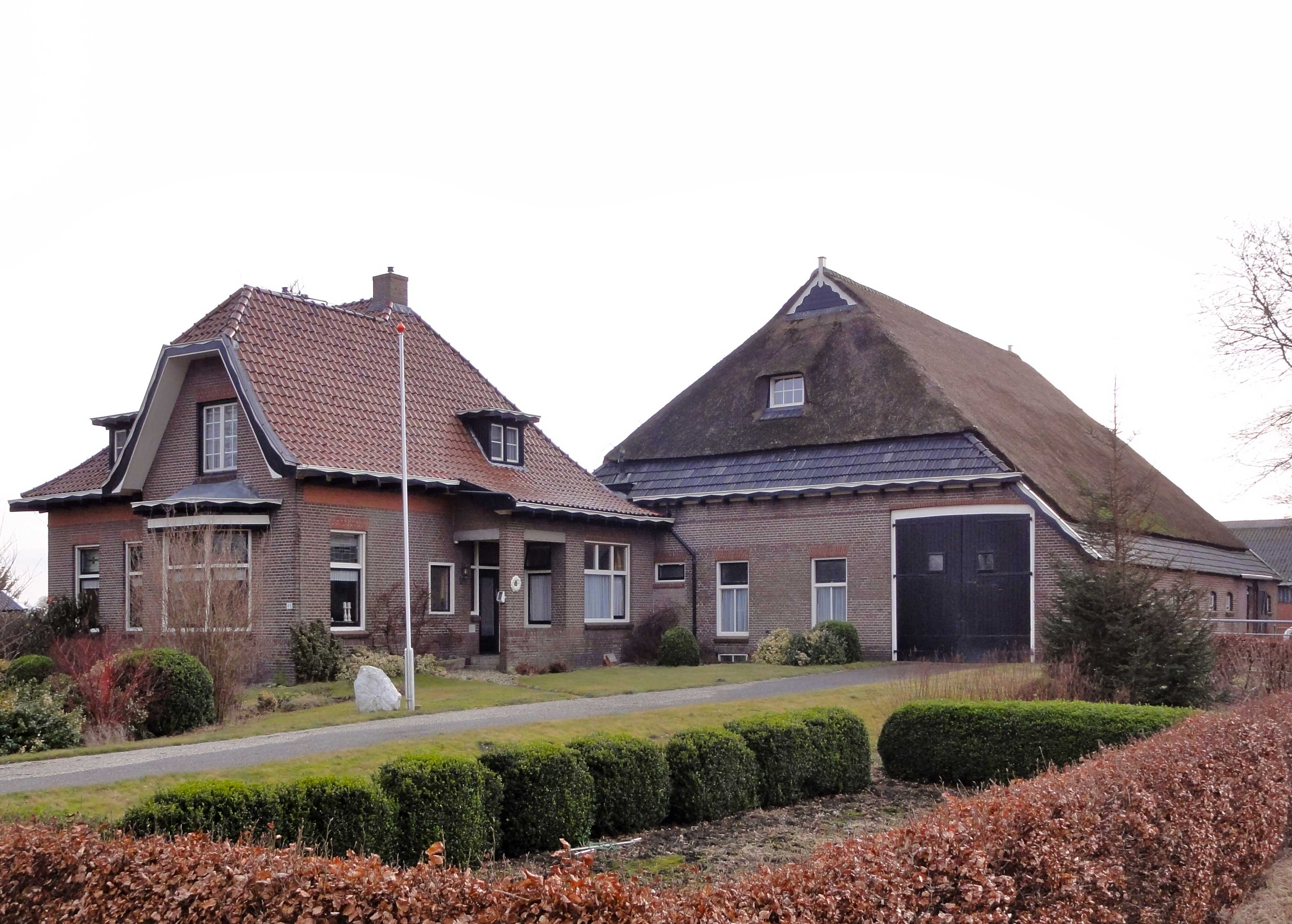
- Farm in Eexterveen

- Flag

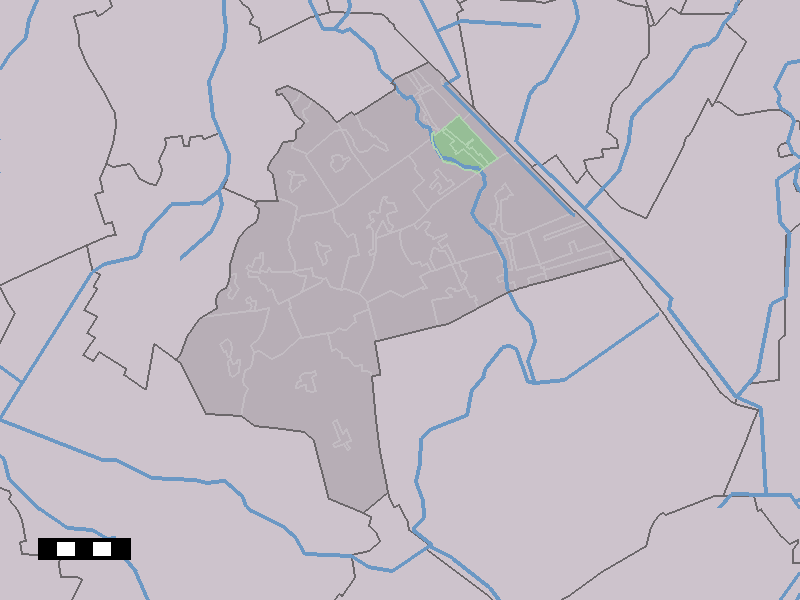
- Eexterveen in the municipality of Aa en Hunze.

- Location in the Netherlands Eexterveen (Netherlands)
- Coordinates: 53°3′14″N 6°48′2″E
- Country: Netherlands
- Province: Drenthe
- Municipality: Aa en Hunze

Area
  - Total: 6.54 km^{2} (2.53 sq mi)
- Elevation: 2.5 m (8.2 ft)

Population (2021)
  - Total: 485
  - Density: 74.2/km^{2} (192/sq mi)
- Time zone: UTC+1 (CET)
  - Summer (DST): UTC+2 (CEST)
- Postal code: 9658
- Dialing code: 0592

Eexterveen is a village in the Dutch province of Drenthe. It is a part of the municipality of Aa en Hunze, and lies about 17 km east of Assen.

== History ==
The village was first mentioned in 1479 as Egesteruene, and means "raised bog belonging to Eext". Eexterveen developed during the 19th century as a peat excavation village.

Eexterveen was home to 187 people in 1840.

== Transportation ==
There is no railway station here. The nearest station is Assen station. Bus service 93 stops in the town. For further information see Aa en Hunze#Transportation.
