= Nooitgedacht, Drenthe =

Nooitgedacht
- Hamlet
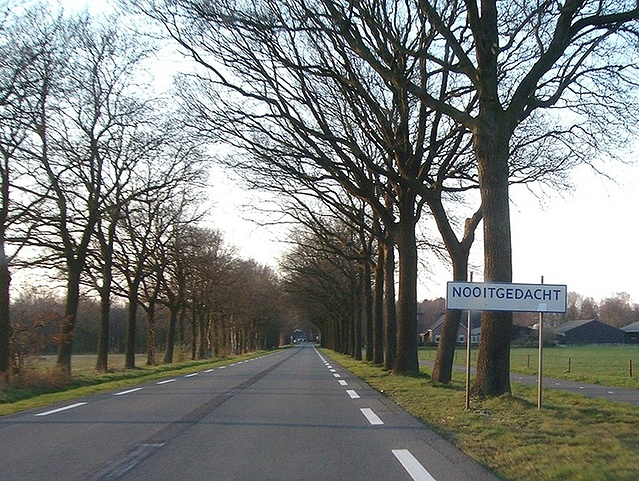
- Nooitgedacht

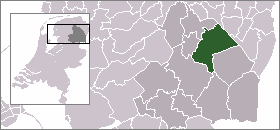

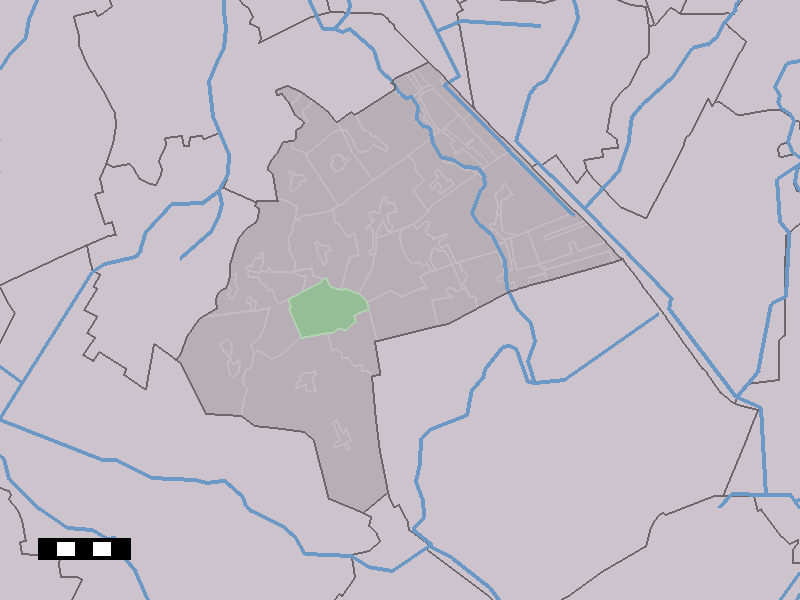
- Nooitgedacht in the municipality of Aa en Hunze.
- Coordinates: 52°58′26″N 6°39′49″E
- Country: Netherlands
- Province: Drenthe
- Municipality: Aa en Hunze

Population (1 January 2008)
  - Total: 312
- Time zone: UTC+1 (CET)
  - Summer (DST): UTC+2 (CEST)

Nooitgedacht is a hamlet in the Dutch province of Drenthe. It is a part of the municipality of Aa en Hunze, and lies about 8 km southeast of Assen.

The statistical area "Nooitgedacht", which can also include the surrounding countryside, has a population of around 330.
