= Amen, Netherlands =

Amen
- Hamlet
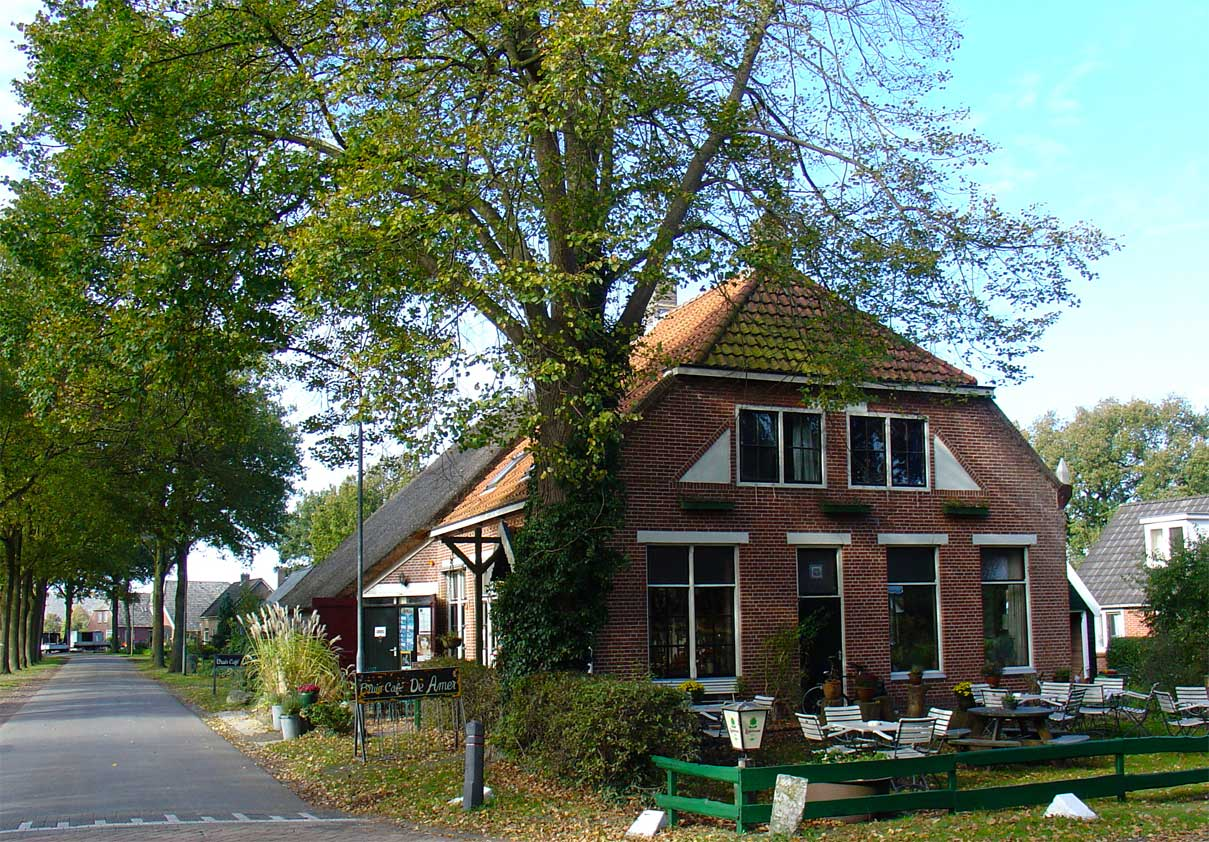
- Pub in Amen

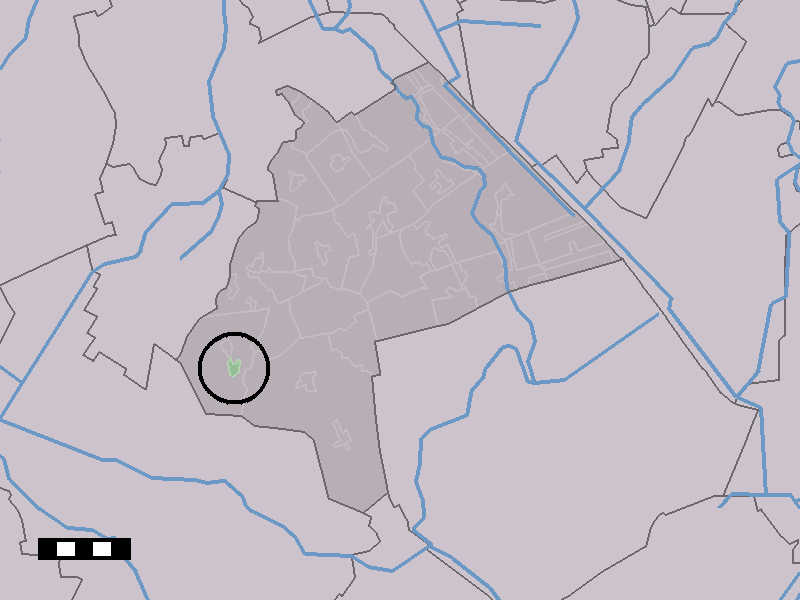
- Amen in the municipality of Aa en Hunze.

- Location in the Netherlands Amen (Netherlands)
- Coordinates: 52°56′30″N 6°36′32″E
- Country: Netherlands
- Province: Drenthe
- Municipality: Aa en Hunze

Area
  - Total: 0.47 km^{2} (0.18 sq mi)
- Elevation: 14 m (46 ft)

Population (2021)
  - Total: 95
  - Density: 200/km^{2} (520/sq mi)
- Time zone: UTC+1 (CET)
  - Summer (DST): UTC+2 (CEST)
- Postal code: 9446
- Dialing code: 0592

Amen is a hamlet in the north-eastern Netherlands. It is a part of the municipality of Aa en Hunze in Drenthe and lies about 8 km south of Assen.

The hamlet has a population of around 90.

== History ==
It was first mentioned in 1403 as "van Ame", and refers the former Ame river. Amen was home to 44 people in 1840.

== Transportation ==
The nearest railway station is Assen railway station. There are no bus services to Amen.
