= Eldersloo =

- Hamlet
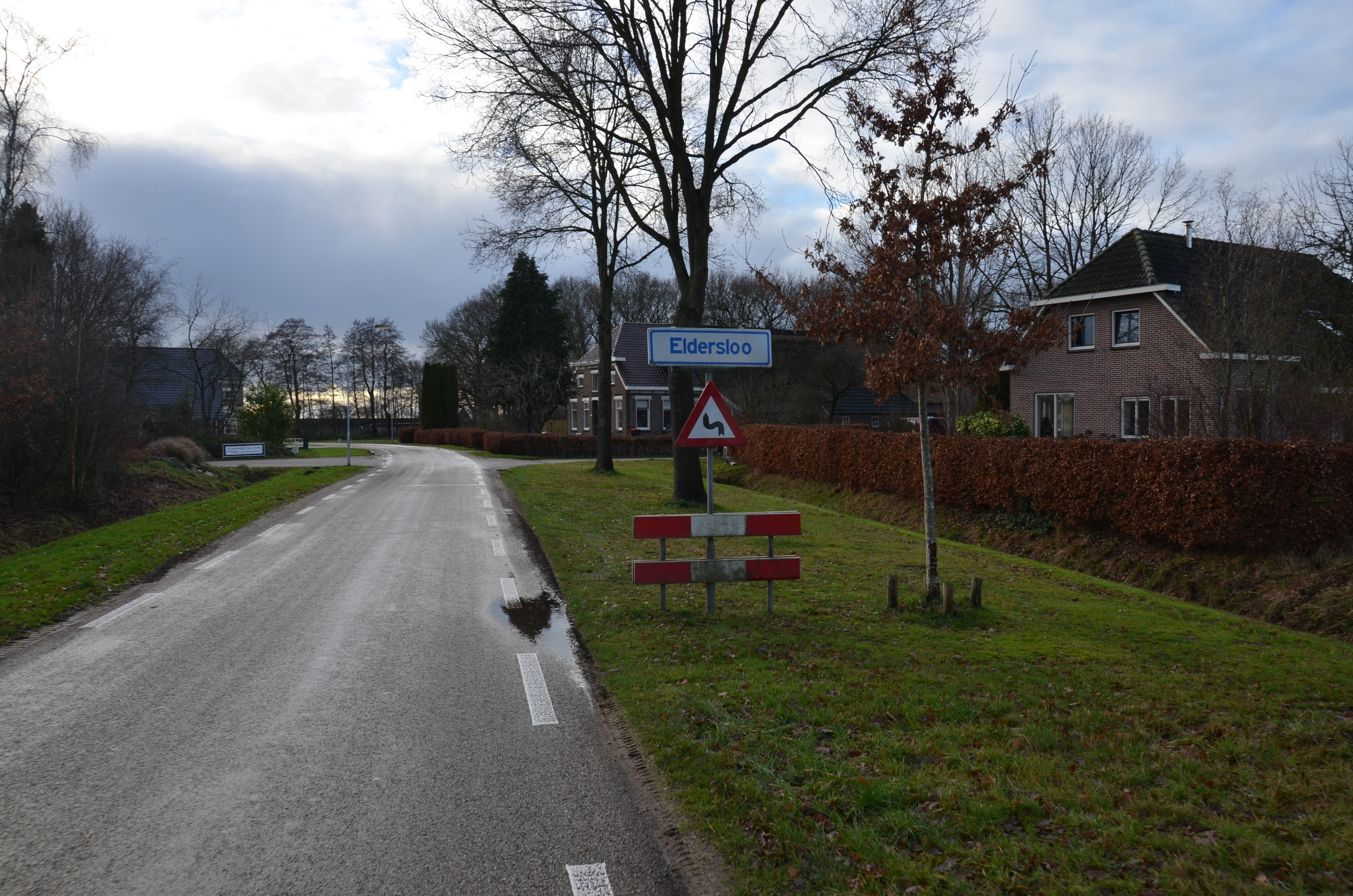
- Eldersloo (2018)

- Location in province of Drenthe in the Netherlands Eldersloo (Netherlands)
- Coordinates: 52°57′56″N 6°37′0″E
- Country: Netherlands
- Province: Drenthe
- Municipality: Aa en Hunze
- Elevation: 13 m (43 ft)
- Time zone: UTC+1 (CET)
  - Summer (DST): UTC+2 (CEST)
- Postal code: 9453
- Dialing code: 0592

Eldersloo is a hamlet in the Netherlands and is part of the Aa en Hunze municipality in Drenthe.

Eldersloo is not a statistical entity, but has its own postal code. It was first mentioned in 1302 as de Heilerslo, and probably means "forest of alder trees". In 1840, it was home to 8 people. Nowadays, it has about 15 houses.
