= Kostvlies =

- Hamlet
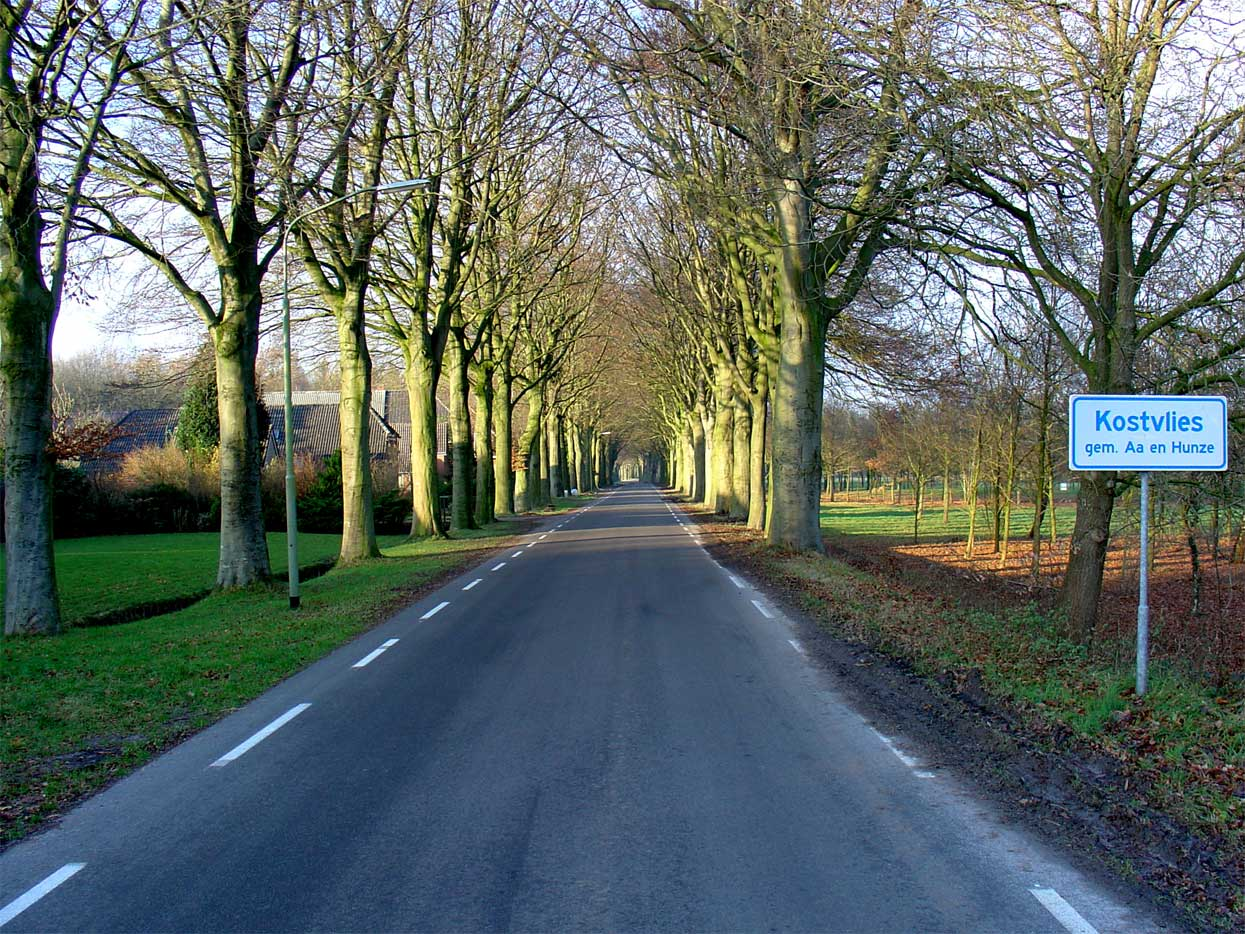

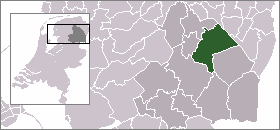

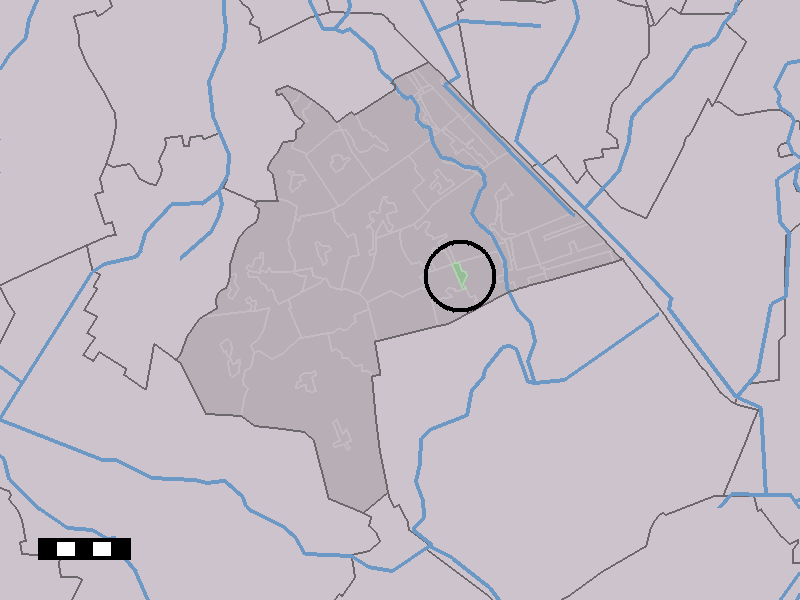
- Kostvlies in the municipality of Aa en Hunze.
- Coordinates: 52°59′9″N 6°47′56″E
- Country: Netherlands
- Province: Drenthe
- Municipality: Aa en Hunze

Population (2005)
  - Total: 130
- Time zone: UTC+1 (CET)
  - Summer (DST): UTC+2 (CEST)

Kostvlies is a hamlet in the Dutch province of Drenthe. It is a part of the municipality of Aa en Hunze, and lies about 16 km east of Assen.

The statistical area "Kostvlies", which can also include the surrounding countryside, has a population of around 130.
