= List of populated places in the Netherlands =

This is an alphabetical list of populated places in the Netherlands.

== A ==
Aadorp - Aagtdorp - Aagtekerke - Aalbeek - Aalburg - Aalden - Aalsmeer - Aalsmeerderbrug - Aalst, Buren - Aalst, North Brabant - Aalst, Zaltbommel - Aalsum, Friesland - Aalsum, Groningen - Aalten - Aardenburg - Aarlanderveen - Aarle-Rixtel - Aartswoud - Abbega - Abbekerk - Abbenbroek - Abbenes - Abcoude - Absdale - Abshoven - Achlum - Achterberg - Achterste Erm - Achterveld - Achthuizen - Achtmaal - Achttienhoven, South Holland - Achttienhoven, Utrecht - Acquoy - Adorp - Aduard - Aduarderzijl - Aegum - Aerdenhout - Aerdt - Afferden, Gelderland - Afferden, Limburg - Agelo - Aijen - Akersloot - Akkrum - Akmarijp - Albergen - Alblasserdam - Aldeboarn - Alem - Alkmaar - Allingawier - Almelo - Almen - Almere - Almkerk - Alphen aan den Rijn - Alphen, Gelderland - Alphen, North Brabant - Alteveer, Groningen - Alteveer, Hoogeveen - Alteveer, Noordenveld - Alteveer, De Wolden - Altforst - Alverna - Ambt Delden - Amby - Ameide - Ameland - Amen - America - Amerongen - Amersfoort - Ammerstol - Ammerzoden - Ampsen - Amstelhoek - Amstelveen - Amstenrade - Amsterdam - Amsweer - Andel - Andelst - Anderen - Andijk - Ane - Anerveen - Anevelde - Angeren - Angerlo - Anjum - Ankeveen - Ankum - Anloo - Anna Jacobapolder - Anna Paulowna - Annen - Annerveenschekanaal - Ansen - Apeldoorn - Appelscha - Appeltern - Appingedam - Arcen - Archem - Arkel - Armhoede - Arnemuiden - Arnhem - Arriën - Arriërveld - Arum - Asch - Asperen - Assel - Asselt - Assen - Assendelft - Assum - Asten - Augsbuurt - Augustinusga - Austerlitz - Avenhorn - Avest - Axel - Azelo - Azewijn

== B ==
Baaiduinen - Baak - Baambrugge - Baard - Baardwijk - Baarland - Baarle-Nassau - Baarlo - Baarlo, Steenwijkerland - Baarlo, Zwartewaterland - Baarn - Baars - Baarschot, Hilvarenbeek - Baarschot, Deurne - Baarschot, Oosterhout - Baarsdorpermeer - Babberich - Babyloniënbroek - Badhoevedorp - Baexem - Baflo - Baijum - Bakel - Bakhuizen - Bakkeveen - Bakkum - Balgoij - Balinge - Balk - Balkbrug - Balloo - Balloërveld - Ballum - Baneheide - Banholt - Bant - Bantega - Barchem - Barendrecht - Bareveld - Barger-Compascuum - Barger-Oosterveld - Barlo - Barneveld - Barnflair - Barsingerhorn - Bartlehiem - Basse - Batenburg - Bath - Bathmen - Bavel - Beckum - Bedum - Beegden - Beek en Donk - Beek - Beek, Berg en Dal - Beek, Montferland - Beekbergen - Beemte-Broekland - Beers, Friesland - Beers, North Brabant - Beerta - Beerze - Beerzerveld - Beesd - Beesel - Beetgum - Beetgumermolen - Beets - Beetsterzwaag - Beilen - Beinsdorp - Bekveld - Belfeld - Bellingwolde - Beltrum - Belt-Schutsloot - Bemelen - Bemmel - Beneden-Leeuwen - Bennebroek - Bennekom - Benneveld - Benningbroek - Benschop - Bentelo - Benthuizen - Bentveld - Berg aan de Maas - Berg en Dal - Berg en Terblijt - Bergambacht - Bergen aan Zee - Bergen, Limburg - Bergen, North Holland - Bergen op Zoom - Bergenhuizen - Bergentheim - Bergeyk - Bergharen - Berghem - Berghuizen, Drenthe - Berghuizen, Heerde - Berghuizen, Overijssel - Bergschenhoek - Bergum - Beringe - Berkel en Rodenrijs - Berkelaar - Berkel-Enschot - Berken-Enschot - Berkenwoude - Berkhout - Berkmeer - Berkum - Berlicum - Berlikum - Bern - Besoyen - Best - Besthmen - Beugen - Beuningen - Beuningen, Overijssel - Beusichem - Beutenaken - Beverwijk - Biddinghuizen - Bierum - Biervliet - Biest-Houtakker - Biezelinge - Biezenmortel - Biggekerke - Bilderdam - Bilthoven - Bingelrade - Bingerden - Binnenwijzend - Birdaard - Blaaksedijk - Bladel - Blankenham - Blaricum - Blauwhuis - Bleijerheide - Bleiswijk - Blerick - Blesdijke - Bleskensgraaf - Blessum - Blija - Blijham - Blitterswijck - Bloemendaal - Blokhuizen - Blokker - Blokzijl - Bobeldijk - Bocholz - Bodegraven - Boekel - Boekelo - Boelenslaan - Boer - Boerakker - Boerakker gem. Leek - Boerdonk - Boerhaar - Boesingheliede - Boijl - Bokhoven - Boksum - Bollingawier - Bolnes - Bolsward - Bontebok - Boornbergum - Boornzwaag - Borculo - Borger - Borgercompagnie - Borghalen - Borgsweer - Borkel en Schaft - Born - Borne - Bornerbroek - Bornwird - Borssele - Bosch en Duin - Boschoord - Boskoop - Bosschenhoofd - Botlek - Boukoul - Bourtange - Boven Hardinxveld - Bovenkarspel - Bovenkerk - Boven-Leeuwen - Bovensmilde - Boxmeer - Boxtel - Bozum - Braamt - Brakel - Brandwijk - Brantgum - Breda - Bredevoort - Breedenbroek - Breezand - Breezanddijk - Breklenkamp - Breskens - Breugel - Breukelen - Breukeleveen - Brielle - Britil - Britsum - Britswerd - Broek fr - Broek in Waterland - Broek op Langedijk - Broekerhaven - Broekhuizen, Drenthe - Broekhuizen, Limburg - Broekhuizenvorst - Broekland - Broeksterwâld - Bronkhorst - Bronneger - Bronnegerveen - Brouwershaven - Brouwhuis - Bruchem - Brucht - Bruchterveld - Bruinehaar - Bruinisse - Brummen - Brunssum - Bruntinge - Buchten - Budel - Budel-Dorplein - Budel-Schoot - Buggenum - Buiksloot - Buinen - Buinerveen - Buitenkaag - Buitenpost - Bunde - Bunne - Bunnik - Bunschoten-Spakenburg - Buren - Buren, Friesland - Buren, Gelderland - Burgerbrug - Burgerveen - Burgervlotbrug - Burgh-Haamstede - Burgum - Burgwerd - Burum - Bussum - Buurmalsen - Buurse

== C ==
Cadier en Keer - Cadzand - Callantsoog - Camerig - Camperduin - Capelle aan den IJssel - Capelle - Castelre - Castenray - Casteren - Castricum - Catrijp - Catsop - Chaam - Chèvremont - Clinge - Coevorden - Colijnsplaat - Collendoorn - Colmschate - Cornjum - Cornwerd - Cortenoever - Cothen - Cottessen - Creil - Cromvoirt - Cruquius - Cuijk - Culemborg

== D ==
Daarle - Daarlerveen - Dale - Dalem - Dalen - Dalerend - Dalerpeel - Dalerveen - Dalfsen - Dalmsholte - Damwâld - Daniken - Darp - De Bilt - De Blesse - De Bult - De Cocksdorp - De Glind - De Goorn - De Groeve - De Haukes - De Heen - De Heurne - De Hoef - De Hoek - De Hoeve - De Kar - De Kiel - De Klencke - De Klomp - De Knipe - De Koog - De Kooy - De Krim - De Kwakel - De Lier - De Lutte - De Marshoek - De Meern - De Moer - De Mortel - De Pol - De Pollen - De Poppe - De Punt - De Rijp - De Stapel - De Steeg - De Tike - De Valom - De Vecht - De Veenhoop - De Waal - De Weere - De Wijk - De Wilgen - De Wilp - De Woude - De Zande - De Zilk - Dearsum - Dedemsvaart - Dedgum - Deelen - Deersum - Deest - Deil - Deinum - Delden - Deldenerbroek - Delfgauw - Delfstrahuizen - Delft - Delfzijl - Delwijnen - Demen - Den Andel - Den Bommel - Den Bosch - Den Burg - Den Dolder - Den Dungen - Den Haag - Den Ham, Groningen - Den Ham, Overijssel - Den Helder - Den Hoorn, Texel - Den Hoorn, Zuid-Holland - Den Hout - Den Hulst - Den Ilp - Den Kaat - Den Nul - Den Oever - Den Velde - Denekamp - Dennenburg - Deurne - Deurningen - Deursen - Deurze - Deventer - De Westereen - Dichteren - Didam - Dielen - Diemen - Diepenheim - Diepenveen - Dieren - Diessen - Dieteren - Diever - Dieverburg - Diffelen - Dijken - Dijkerhoek - Dijkhuizen - Dinteloord - Dinther - Dinxperlo - Diphoorn - Dirkshorn - Dirksland - Dishoek - Dodewaard - Doenrade - Doesburg - Doetinchem - Doeveren - Doezum - Dokkum - Dokkumer Nieuwe Zijlen - Doldersum - Domburg - Dommelen - Donderen - Dongen - Dongjum - Doniaga - Donk, Limburg - Donk, Noord-Brabant - Donkerbroek - Doorn - Doornenburg - Doornspijk - Doorwerth - Dordrecht - Dorkwerd - Dorplein - Dorregeest - Dorst - Dortherhoek - Douvergenhout - Draaibrug - Drachten - Drachtstercompagnie - Dreischor - Drempt - Dreumel - Drie - Driebergen - Driebergen-Rijsenburg - Drieborg - Driebrunnen - Driehuis - Driehuizen - Driel - Driesum - Driewegen - Drijber - Drimmelen - Drogeham - Drogteropslagen - Drongelen - Dronrijp - Dronten - Drouwen - Drouwenermond - Drouwenerveen - Drumpt - Drunen - Druten - Dubbeldam - Duistervoorde - Duiven - Duivendrecht - Duizel - Dulder - Durgerdam - Dussen - Duur - Dwingeloo

== E ==
Eagum - Eastermar - Echt - Echteld - Echten, Drenthe - Echten, Friesland - Echtenerbrug - Echterbosch - Eck en Wiel - Eckelrade - Edam - Ede, Gelderland - Edens - Ederveen - Ee - Eede zld - Eefde - Eelde - Eelderwolde - Eemdijk - Eemnes - Eemshaven - Eemster - Een - Eenigenburg - Eenrum - Eenum - Een-West - Eerbeek - Eerde, Noord-Brabant - Eerde, Overijssel - Eernewoude - Eersel - Eerste Exloërmond - Ees - Eese - Eesergroen - Eeserveen Borger - Eeserveen Odoorn - Eesterga - Eestrum - Eesveen - Eethen - Eext - Eexterveen - Eexterveenschekanaal - Eexterzandvoort - Egchel - Egmond aan den Hoef - Egmond aan Zee - Egmond-Binnen - Egmondermeer - Eibergen - Eierland - Eijsden - Eindhoven - Einighausen - Ekehaar - Elahuizen - Elburg - Elden - Eldersloo - Eldrik - Eleveld - Elim - Elkenrade - Elkerzee - Ell - Ellecom - Ellemeet - Ellerhuizen - Ellertshaar - Ellewoutsdijk - Elp - Elsen - Elsendorp - Elshof - Elshout - Elsloo, Friesland - Elsloo, Limburg - Elspeet - Elst, Gelderland - Elst, Utrecht - Emmeloord - Emmen - Emmer-Compascuum - Empe - Empel - Emst - Engelbert, Groningen - Engelen - Engelum - Engwierum - Enkhuizen - Ens - Enschede - Enschot - Enspijk - Enter - Enumatil - Epe - Epen - Eperheide - Eppenhuizen - Epse - Erica - Erichem - Erlecom - Erm - Ermelo - Erp - Esbeek - Esch - Escharen - Espel - Espelo - Est - Etenaken - Etten gld - Etten-Leur - Europoort - Eursinge gem. Ruinen - Eursinge gem. Westerbork - Euverem - Everdingen - Evertsoord - Ewijcksluis Van - Ewijk - Exel - Exloërveen - Exloo - Exmorra - Eygelshoven - Eys - Eyserheide - Ezinge - Ezumazijl

== F ==
Farmsum - Feerwerd - Ferwerd - Ferwoude - Fijnaart - Finkum - Finsterwolde - Firdgum - Fleringen - Fluitenberg - Fochteloo - Follega - Folsgare - Formerum - Fort - Foudgum - Foxham - Foxhol - Foxwolde - Franeker - Frederiksoord - Friens - Frieschepalen - Froombosch

== G ==
Gaanderen - Gaarkeuken - Gaast - Gaastmeer - Galder - Gameren - Gammelke - Gapinge - Garderen - Garijp - Garmerwolde - Garminge - Garnwerd - Garrelsweer - Garsthuizen - Gassel - Gasselte - Gasselterboerveen - Gasselternijveen - Gasselter-Nijveensche-mond - Gastel - Gasteren - Gasthuis - Gauw - Geelbroek - Geerdijk - Geersbroek - Geersdijk - Geertruidenberg - Geervliet - Gees - Geesbrug - Geesteren, Gelderland - Geesteren, Overijssel - Geeuwenbrug gem. Diever - Geffen - Gelderingen - Geldermalsen - Gelderswoude - Geldrop - Geleen - Gellicum - Gelselaar - Gemert - Gemonde - Genderen - Gendringen - Gendt - Genemuiden - Gennep - Genum - Gerkesklooster - Gerner - Gersloot - Gerwen - Geulhem - Geulle - Geverik - Geysteren - Giekerk - Giesbeek - Giessen - Giessenburg - Giessendam - Gieten - Gieterveen - Giethmen - Giethoorn - Gilze - Glane - Glanerbrug - Glimmen - Godlinze - Goedereede - Goënga - Goëngahuizen - Goes - Goingarijp - Goirle - Goor - Gorinchem - Gorredijk - Gorssel - Gortel - Gouda - Goudriaan - Goudswaard - Gouerak - Goutum - Graauw - Graetheide - Grafhorst - Graft - Gramsbergen - Grashoek - Grathem - Grave - Greffelkamp - Greonterp - Grevenbicht - Griendtsveen - Grijpskerk - Grijpskerke - Groede - Groenekan - Groeningen - Groenlo - Groenveld - Groesbeek - Groessen - Groet - Groetpolder - Grolloo - Groningen - Gronsveld - Groot Dochteren - Groot Genhout - Groot-Ammers - Groote Keeten - Grootebroek - Grootegast - Grootschermer - Grosthuizen - Grou - Grubbenvorst - Gulpen - Guttecoven

== H ==
Haaften - Haaksbergen - Haakswold - Haalderen - Haamrade - Haamstede - Haaren - Haarle gem. Hellendoorn - Haarle gem. Tubbergen - Haarlem - Haarlemmerliede - Haarlo - Haarsteeg - Haart - Haarzuilens - Haasdal - Haastrecht - Haelen - Haerst - Hagestein - Haghorst - Haler - Halfweg - Hall - Halle - Hallum - Halsteren - Hamert - Handel - Hardinxveld-Giessendam - Hank - Hansweert - Hantum - Hantumeruitburen - Hantumhuizen - Hapert - Haps - Harbrinkhoek - Harculo - Hardegarijp - Hardenberg - Harderwijk - Haren, Groningen - Haren, Noord-Brabant - Harfsen - Hargen - Harich - Haringhuizen - Harkema - Harkstede - Harlingen - Harmelen - Harreveld - Harskamp - Hartwerd - Haskerdijken - Haskerhorne - Hasselo - Hasselt - Hattem - Hattemerbroek - Haule - Haulerwijk - Hauwert - Havelte - Havelterberg - Hazerswoude-Dorp - Hazerswoude-Rijndijk - Hedel - Hedikhuizen - Hee - Heeg - Heek - Heel - Heelsum - Heelweg - Heemserveen - Heemskerk - Heemstede - Heenvliet - Heer - Heerde - Heerenveen - Heerewaarden - Heerhugowaard - Heerjansdam - Heerle - Heerlen - Heerlerbaan - Heerlerheide - Heesbeen - Heesch - Heesselt - Heeswijk-Dinther - Heeten - Heeze - Hegelsom - Hei- en Boeicop - Heibloem - Heide - Heidenhoek - Heijen - Heijenrath - Heijningen - Heikant - Heilig Landstichting - Heiligerlee - Heiloo - Heinenoord - Heinkenszand - Heino - Hekelingen - Hekendorp - Helden - Helenaveen - Hellendoorn - Hellevoetsluis - Hellouw - Hellum - Helmond - Helvoirt - Hem - Hemelum - Hemmen - Hempens - Hemrik - Hendrik-Ido-Ambacht - Hengelo, Gelderland - Hengelo, Overijssel - Hengevelde - Hengforden - Hengstdijk - Hennaard - Hensbroek - Herbaijum - Herkenbosch - Herkenrade - Herkingen - Hernen - Herpen - Herpt - Herten - Hertme - Herveld - Herwen - Herwijnen - Herxen - Hessum - Het Koegras - Het Loo - Het Woud - Heteren - Heugem - Heukelom - Heukelum - Heumen - Heurne gem. Aalten - Heurne gem. Ruurlo - Heusden gem. Asten - Heusden gem. Heusden - Heveadorp - Heveskes - Heythuysen - Hezingen - Hiaure - Hichtum - Hidaard - Hien - Hierden - Hieslum - Hijken - Hijkersmilde - Hijlaard - Hijum - Hillegom - Hilleshagen - Hilvarenbeek - Hilversum - Hindeloopen - Hintham - Hippolytushoef - Hitzum - Hobrede - Hoedekenskerke - Hoek - Hoek van Holland - Hoenderloo - Hoensbroek - Hoenzadriel - Hoevelaken - Hoeven - Hoge Hexel - Hogebeintum - Hogeweg - Hollandsche Rading - Hollandscheveld - Hollum - Holset - Holsloot - Holten - Holterberg - Holthees - Holtherne - Holthone - Holtum - Holwerd - Holwierde - Holysloot - Hommert - Hommerts - Homoet - Honselerdijk - Honthem - Hoofddorp - Hoofdplaat - Hoog Soeren - Hoogblokland - Hoogcruts - Hooge Mierde - Hooge Zwaluwe - Hoogeloon - Hoogengraven - Hoogenweg - Hoogerheide - Hoogersmilde - Hoogeveen - Hoogezand - Hooghalen - Hoogkarspel - Hoog-Keppel - Hoogkerk - Hoogland - Hooglanderveen - Hoogmade - Hoogvliet rt - Hoogwoud - Hoonhorst - Hoordwijkerhout - Hoorn - Hoorn Terschelling - Hoornaar - Hoornsterzwaag - Hopel - Horn - Hornhuizen - Horssen - Horst aan de Maas - Horst lb - Hout lb - Hout-Blerick - Houten - Houtigehade - Houwerzijl - Huijbergen - Huinen - Huins - Huis ter Heide, Drenthe - Huis ter Heide, Utrecht - Huisduinen - Huisseling - Huissen - Huizen - Huizinge - Hulhuizen - Hulsberg - Hulsel - Hulsen - Hulshorst - Hulst - Hulten - Hummelo - Hunnecum - Hunsel - Hupsel - Hurdegarijp - Hurwenen

== I ==
Idaard - Idsegahuizum - Idskenhuizen - Idzega - IJhorst - IJlst - IJmuiden - IJsselham - IJsselmuiden - IJsselstein - IJzendijke - IJzendoorn - IJzeren - IJzerlo - IJzevoorde - Illikhoven - Ilpendam - Indijk - Ingber - Ingen - It Heidenskip - Itnes - Itteren - Ittersum - Ittervoort

== J ==
Jaarsveld - Jabeek - Janum - Jellum - Jelsum - Jipsingboermussel - Jipsingboertange - Jipsinghuizen - Jirnsum - Jislum - Jisp - Jistrum - Jonkerslân - Jonkersvaart - Joppe - Jorwerd - Joure - Jouswier - Jubbega - Julianadorp - Junne - Jutphaas - Jutrijp

== K ==
Kaag - Kaalheide - Kaart - Kaatsheuvel - Kadoelen - Kakert - Kalenberg - Kallenkote - Kalverdijk - Kamerik - Kampen - Kampereiland - Kamperland - Kamperveen - Kamperzeedijk - Kantens - Kapel-Avezaath - Kapel-Avezaath gem. Buren - Kapelle - Kapellebrug - Katlijk - Kats - Kattendijke - Katwijk, North Brabant - Katwijk, South Holland - Katwijk aan de Rijn - Katwijk aan Zee - Katwoude - Kedichem - Keent - Keijenborg - Keinsmerbrug - Kekerdom - Keldonk - Kelmond - Kelpen - Kerbuurt - Kerk-Avezaath - Kerk-Avezaath gem. Tiel - Kerkdriel - Kerkenveld - Kerkrade - Kerkwerve - Kerkwijk - Kessel, Limburg - Kessel, Noord-Brabant - Kesseleik - Kesteren - Kethel - Keutenberg - Kibbelveen - Kiel-Windeweer - Kijkduin - Kijkuit - Kilder - Kimswerd - Kinderdijk - Kinnum - Klaaswaal - Klarenbeek - Klazienaveen - Klein Dochteren - Klein Genhout - Klein Ulsda - Klein Zundert - Kleine Huisjes - Kleverskerke - Klijndijk - Klimmen - Kloetinge - Kloosterburen - Kloosterdijk - Kloosterhaar - Klooster-Lidlum - Kloosterzande - Klundert - Knegsel - Kockengen - Koedijk - Koekange - Koewacht - Kogerpolder - Kolderveen - Kolderveense Bovenboer - Kolderwolde - Kolham - Kolhorn - Kollum - Kollumerpomp - Kollumerzwaag - Kommerzijl - Koningsbosch - Koninngslust - Koog aan de Zaan - Kootstertille - Kootwijk - Kootwijkerbroek - Kornhorn - Kornwerderzand - Kortehemmen - Kortenhoef - Kortgene - Koudekerk aan den Rijn - Koudekerke - Koudum - Koufurderigge - Krabbendam - Krabbendijke - Kraggenburg - Kranenburg - Kreileroord - Krewerd - Krimpen aan de Lek - Krimpen aan den IJssel - Kring van Dorth - Krommenie - Krommeniedijk - Kronenberg - Kropswolde - Kruiningen - Kruisdijk - Kruisland - Kruispolderhaven - Kruisweg, Groningen - Kruisweg, Zuid-Holland - Kubaard - Kudelstaart - Kuinre - Kuitaart - Kunrade - Kwadendamme - Kwadijk - Kwintsheul

== L ==
Laag Zuthem - Laaghalen - Laaghalerveen - Laag-Keppel - Laag-Soeren - Lage Mierde - Lage Vuursche - Lage Zwaluwe - Lageland - Lambertschaag - Lamswaarde - Landerum - Landgraaf - Landhorst - Landsmeer - Langbroek - Langedijke - Langelille - Langelo, Drenthe - Langelo, Overijssel - Langenboom - Langeraar - Langerak - Langeveen - Langeweg - Langezwaag - Langweer - Lankhorst - Laren, Gelderland - Laren, Noord-Holland - Lathum - Lattrop-Breklenkamp - Lauradorp - Lauwersoog - Lauwerzijl - Ledeacker - Leek - Leende - Leens - Leerbroek - Leerdam - Leermens - Leersum - Leesten - Leeuwarden - Leeuwen - Legemeer - Leggeloo - Leiden - Leiderdorp - Leidschendam - Leimuiden - Leimuiderbrug - Lekkerkerk - Lekkum - Lellens - Lelystad - Lemele - Lemelerveld - Lemiers - Lemmer - Lemselo - Lengel - Lent - Lenthe - Lepelstraat - Lerop - Lettelbert - Lettele - Leuken - Leunen - Leur - Leusden - Leuth - Leutingewolde - Leuvenheim - Leuvenum - Leveroy - Lewedorp - Lexmond - Lhee - Lheebroek - Lichtaard - Lichtenvoorde - Lichtmis - Liempde - Lienden - Lierderholthuis - Lieren - Lierop - Lies, Friesland - Lies, North Brabant - Lieshout - Liessel - Lievelde - Lieveren - Lijnden - Limbricht - Limmel - Limmen - Linde, Drenthe - Linde gem. Diepenveen - Linde, Gelderland - Linden - Linne - Linschoten - Lintelo - Lintvelde - Lioessens - Lions - Lippenhuizen - Lisse - Lisserbroek - Lith - Lithoijen - Lobith - Lochem - Loenen a/d Vecht - Loenen gem. Valburg - Loenen, Gelderland - Loenersloot - Loënga - Loerbeek - Loil - Lollum - Lomm - Longerhouw - Lonneker - Loo, Gelderland - Loo, Overijssel - Loon - Loon op Zand - Loosbroek - Loosdrecht - Loosduinen - Loozen - Lopik - Lopikerkapel - Loppersum - Losdorp - Losser - Lottum - Lucaswolde - Luchthaven Schiphol - Luchthaven Zuid-Limburg - Luddeweer - Luinjeberd - Lunteren - Lutjebroek - Lutjegast - Lutjewinkel - Lutkewierum - Luttelgeest - Lutten - Luttenberg - Luxwoude - Luyksgestel

== M ==
Maarheeze - Maarland - Maarn - Maarsbergen - Maarssen - Maarssenbroek - Maartensdijk - Maasbommel - Maasbracht - Maasbree - Maasdam - Maasdijk - Maashees - Maasland - Maasniel - Maassluis - Maastricht - Maasvlakte - Macharen - Made - Makkinga - Makkum, Drenthe - Makkum, Littenseradiel - Makkum, Súdwest-Fryslân - Malden - Mamelis - Mander - Manderveen - Mantgum - Mantinge - Maren-Kessel - Margraten - Mariaheide - Mariahoop - Mariahout - Mariaparochie - Mariënberg - Mariënheem - Mariënvelde - Marijenkampen - Markelo - Marken - Markenbinnen - Marknesse - Markvelde - Marle gem. Wijhe - Marrum - Marssum - Martenshoek - Marum - Marwijksoord - Mastenbroek - Matsloot - Maurik - Mechelen - Medemblik - Meeden - Meedhuizen - Meerkerk - Meerlo - Meerstad - Meerveld - Meerveldhoven - Meessen - Meeuwen - Megchelen - Megen - Meijel - Melderslo - Melick - Meliskerke - Melissant - Menaldum - Mensingeweer - Meppel - Meppen - Merkelbeek - Merslo - Merum - Mesch - Meteren - Meterik - Metslawier - Mheer - Middelaar - Middelbeers - Middelbert - Middelburg - Middelharnis - Middelie - Middelrode - Middelstum - Middenbeemster - Middenmeer - Midlaren - Midlum - Midsland - Midwolda - Midwolde - Midwoud - Miedum - Mierlo - Mierlo-Hout - Mijdrecht - Mijnsheerenland - Mijzen - Mildam - Milheeze - Mill - Millingen aan de Rijn - Millingen Legerplaats - Milsbeek - Minnertsga - Mirns - Moddergat - Moerdijk - Moergestel - Moerkapelle - Moerstraten - Molenaarsgraaf - Molenend - Molenhoek - Molenrij - Molenschot - Molkwerum - Monnickendam - Monster - Montfoort - Montfort - Mook - Mookhoek - Moordrecht - Moorveld - Morra - Muggenbeet - Muiden - Muiderberg - Mukkekeburen - Mûnein - Munnekemoer - Munnekezijl - Munstergeleen - Muntendam - Mussel - Musselkanaal

== N ==
Naaldwijk - Naarden - Nagele - Nattenhoven - Neck - Nederasselt - Nederhemert - Nederhorst den Berg - Nederland - Nederweert - Nederweert Eind - Nederwetten - Neede - Neer - Neerbeek - Neerijnen - Neeritter - Neerkant - Neerloon - Nes aan de Amstel - Nes, Ameland - Nes gem. Boarsterhim - Nes gem. Dongeradeel - Nessersluis - Netersel - Nettelhorst - Netterden - Niawier - Nibbixwoud - Niebert - Niehove - Niekerk gem. de Marne - Niekerk gem. Grootegast - Niersen - Nietap - Nieuw-Beerta - Nieuw Bergen - Nieuw Dordrecht - Nieuw Einde - Nieuw en St. Joosand - Nieuw Helvoet - Nieuw Millingen - Nieuw Zwinderen - Nieuwaal - Nieuw-Amsterdam - Nieuw-Annerveen - Nieuw-Balinge - Nieuw-Beijerland - Nieuw-Buinen - Nieuwdorp - Nieuwe Bildtzijl - Nieuwe Krim - Nieuwe Meer - Nieuwe Niedorp - Nieuwe Pekela - Nieuwe Wetering - Nieuwebrug, Friesland - Nieuwebrug, Noord-Holland - Nieuwediep - Nieuwegein - Nieuwehorne - Nieuwendam - Nieuwendijk - Nieuwenhagen - Nieuwenhoorn - Nieuwer ter Aa - Nieuwerbrug - Nieuwerkerk aan den IJssel - Nieuwerkerk - Nieuweroord - Nieuwersluis - Nieuweschans - Nieuweschild - Nieuweschoot - Nieuwe-Tonge - Nieuw-Heeten - Nieuwkoop - Nieuwkuijk - Nieuwland - Nieuwlande - Nieuw-Lekkerland - Nieuwleusden - Nieuw-Loosdrecht - Nieuw-Namen - Nieuwolda - Nieuwpoort - Nieuw-Roden - Nieuw-Scheemda - Nieuw-Schoonebeek - Nieuwstadt - Nieuwveen - Nieuw-Vennep - Nieuwvliet - Nieuw-Vossemeer - Nieuw-Weerdinge - Nieuw-Wehl - Niezijl - Nifterik - Nigteveld - Nij Beets - Nijbroek - Nijeberkoop - Nijega - Nijehaske - Nijeholtpade - Nijeholtwolde - Nijelamer - Nijemirdum - Nijensleek - Nijetrijne - Nijeveen - Nijeveense Bovenboer - Nijezijl - Nijhuizum - Nijkerk - Nijkerkerveen - Nijland - Nijlande - Nijmegen - Nijnsel - Nijswiller - Nijverdal - Nispen - Nisse - Nistelrode - Nooitgedacht - Noorbeek - Noord Deurningen - Noordbeesmster - Noordbergum - Noordbroek - Noorddijk - Noordeinde, Gelderland - Noordeinde, Noord-Holland - Noordeloos - Noorden - Noordgouwe - Noordhoek gem. Klundert - Noordhoek gem. Standaarbuiten - Noordhorn - Noordijk, Gelderland - Noordijk, Overijssel - Noordlaren - Noord-Scharwoude - Noordsche Schut - Noord-Sleen - Noordwelle - Noordwijk, Groningen - Noordwijk, Zuid-Holland - Noordwolde, Friesland - Noordwolde, Groningen - Nootdorp - Norg - Notter - Nuenen - Nuis - Nuland - Numansdorp - Nunhem - Nunspeet - Nuth - Nutter

== O ==
Obbicht - Obdam - Ochten - Odijk - Odilliapeel - Odoorn - Odoornerveen - Oeffelt - Oegstgeest - Oeken - Oene - Oenkerk - Oensel - Oentsjerk - Oerle - Offingawier - Ohé en Laak - Oijen nb - Oirlo - Oirsbeek - Oirschot - Oisterwijk - Okkenbroek - Olburgen - Oldeberkoop - Oldeboorn - Oldebroek - Oldebroek Legerplaats - Oldeholtpade - Oldeholtwolde - Oldehove - Oldekerk - Oldelamer - Oldemarkt - Oldenzaal - Oldenzijl - Oldeouwer - Oldetrijne - Oler - Olland - Olst - Olterterp - Ommel, Noord-Brabant - Ommen - Ommeren - Ommerschans - Onderdijk - Onderendam - Onderste Locht - Onna - Onnen - Onstwedde - Ooij gem. Ubbergen - Ooijen lb - Ool - Oolde - Ooltgensplaat - Oost - Oost-, West- en Middelbeers - Oostbierum - Oostburg - Oostdijk - Oosteind - Oostendam - Oosterbeek - Oosterblokker - Oosterboer - Oosterend, Friesland - Oosterend, Noord-Holland - Oosterend, Terschelling - Oosterhesselen - Oosterhout, Gelderland - Oosterhout, Noord-Brabant - Oosterhuizen - Oosterland, Noord-Holland - Oosterland, Zeeland - Oosterleek - Oosterlittens - Oosternieland - Oosternijkerk - Oosterstreek - Oosterwierum - Oosterwijk - Oosterwijtwerd - Oosterwolde, Friesland - Oosterwolde, Gelderland - Oosterzee - Oost-Graftdijk - Oosthem - Oosthuizen - Oostkapelle - Oostknollendam - Oostmahorn - Oostrum - Oost-Souburg - Oostum - Oostvoorne - Oostwold gem. Leek - Oostwold gem. Scheemda - Oostwoud - Oostzaan - Ootmarsum - Ootrum - Ooy - Opeinde - Opende - Ophemert - Opheusden - Opijnen - Oploo - Opmeer - Oppenhuizen - Opperdoes - Oranje - Oranjedorp - Oranjewoud - Orvelte - Osingahuizen - Ospel - Oss - Ossendrecht - Ossenisse - Ossenwaard zh - Ossenzijl - Oterdum - Oterleek - Othene - Otterlo - Ottersum - Ottoland - Oud Ade - Oud Avereest - Oud Gastel - Oud Milligen - Oud Ootmarsum - Oud Sabbinge - Oud Valkenburg - Oud-Alblas - Oud-Annerveen - Oud-Beijerland - Ouddorp zh - Oude Bildtzijl - Oude Leede - Oude Leije - Oude Meer - Oude Niedorp - Oude Pekela - Oude Wetering - Oude Willem - Oudega gem. Gaasterlân-Sleat - Oudega gem. Smallingerland - Oudega gem. Wytbritseradiel - Oudehaske - Oudehorne - Ouderkerk aan de Amstel - Oudelande - Oudemirdum - Oudemolen, Drenthe - Oudemolen, Noord-Brabant - Oudenbosch - Oudendijk, Noord-Brabant - Oudendijk, Noord-Holland - Oudenhoorn - Ouderkerk aan den IJssel - Oudeschand - Oudeschild - Oudeschip - Oudeschoot - Oudesluis - Oude-Tonge - Oudewater - Oudezijl - Oudkarspel - Oudkerk - Oudleusden - Oud-Loosdrecht - Oudorp - Oud-Vossemeer - Oudwolde - Oud-Zevenaar - Oud-Zuilen - Ouwerkerk - Ouwsterhaule - Ouwster-Nijega - Overasselt - Overberg - Overdinkel - Overlangel - Overloon - Overschild - Overslag - Overveen - Ovezande

== P ==
Paasloo - Padhuis - Paesens - Palemig - Panheel - Pannerden - Panningen - Papekop - Papendrecht - Papenhoven - Papenvoort - Parrega - Partij - Passewaay - Paterswolde - Peelo - Peest - Peins - Peize - Peizermade - Peperga - Pernis - Persingen - Pesse - Petten - Pey - Philippine - Piaam - Piershil - Pieterburen - Pietersbierum - Pieterzijl - Pijnacker - Pikveld - Pingjum - Plasmolen - Poederoijen - Poeldijk - Polsbroek - Polsbroekerdam - Poortugaal - Poortvliet - Poppingawier - Posterholt - Prinsenbeek - Puiflijk - Punthorst - Purmer - Purmerend - Purmerland - Putbroek - Puth - Putte - Putten - Puttershoek

== Q ==
Quirijnstok

== R ==
Raalte - Raamsdonk - Raamsdonksveer - Raard - Raath - Radewijk - Radio Kootwijk - Raerd - Ramspol - Randwijk - Ransdaal - Ransdorp - Rasquert - Rauwert - Ravenstein - Ravenswaay - Ravenswoud - Rechteren - Reduzum - Reek - Reeuwijk - Reijmerstok - Reitsum - Rekken - Remmerden - Renesse - Renkum - Renswoude - Ressen - Retranchement - Reusel - Reutje - Reutum - Reuver - Rha - Rheden - Rhederveld gem. Bellingwedde - Rhederveld gem. Vlagtwedde - Rhee - Rheeze - Rheezerveen - Rhenen - Rhenoy - Rhienderen - Rhoon - Ridderkerk - Ried - Riel - Rien - Riethoven - Rietmolen - Riihem - Rijckholt - Rijen - Rijkevoort - Rijnsaterwoude - Rijnsburg - Rijperkerk - Rijpwetering - Rijs - Rijsbergen - Rijsenburg - Rijsenhout - Rijsoord - Rijssen - Rijswijk, Gelderland - Rijswijk, Noord-Brabant - Rijswijk, Zuid-Holland - Rilland - Rimburg - Rinnegom - Rinsumageest - De Rips - Rockanje - Roden - Roderesch - Roderwolde - Roelofarendsveen - Roermond - Rogat - Roggel - Rohel - Rolde - Roodeschool - Roodhuis - Roodkerk - Roordahuizum - Roosendaal - Roosteren - Rooth - Rosmalen - Rossum, Gelderland - Rossum, Overijssel - Roswinkel - Rothem - Rotstergaast - Rotsterhaule - Rotterdam - Rotterdam Albrands - Rottevalle - Rottum, Friesland - Rottum, Groningen - Rouveen - Rozenburg, Noord-Holland - Rozenburg, Zuid-Holland - Rozendaal - Rucphen - Ruigahuizen - Ruigezand - Ruigoord - Ruinen - Ruinerwold - Ruischerbrug - Rumpen - Rumpt - Rustenburg - Rutten - Ruurlo

== S ==
Saaksum - Saasveld - Saaxumhuizen - Sambeek - Sandfirden - Santpoort-Noord - Santpoort-Zuid - Sappemeer - Sas van Gent - Sasput - Sassenheim - Sauwerd - Schaarsbergen - Schaesberg - Schagen - Schagerbrug - Schagerwaard - Schaijk - Schalkhaar - Schalkwijk - Schalsum - Schandelen - Schandelo - Schardam - Scharendijke - Scharmer - Scharnegoutum - Scharsterbrug - Scharwoude - Schaveren - Scheemda - Scheerwolde - Schelle - Schellingwoude - Schellinkhout - Schelluinen - Schermerhorn - Scherpenisse - Scherpenzeel, Friesland - Scherpenzeel, Gelderland - Schettens - Scheulder - Scheveningen - Schiedam - Schiermonnikoog - Schijf - Schijndel - Schilberg gem. Margraten - Schilberg gem. Witten - Schildwolde - Schimmert - Schin op Geul - Schingen - Schinnen - Schinveld - Schipborg - Schiphol - Schiphol-Centrum - Schiphol-Oost - Schiphol-Rijk - Schipluiden - Schoonbron - Schoondijke - Schoonebeek - Schoonheeten - Schoonhoven - Schoonloo - Schoonoord - Schoonrewoerd - Schoorl - Schoorldam gem. Schoorl - Schoorldam gem. Warmenhuizen - Schore - Schoterzijl - Schouwerzijl - Schraard - Schuddebeurs Schouwen - Schuilenburg, Friesland - Schuilenburg, Overijssel - Schuilingsoord - Schuinesloot - Schweiberg - Sebaldeburen - Seerijp - Sellingen - Serooskerke Schouwen - Serooskerke, Walcheren - Sevenum - Sexbierum - 's Gravenmoer - 's-Graveland - 's-Gravendeel - 's-Gravenhage - 's-Gravenpolder - 's-Gravenzande - 's-Heer Abtskerke - 's-Heer Arendskerke - 's-Heer Hendrikskinderen - 's-Heerenberg - 's-Heerenbroek - 's-Heerenhoek - 's-Hertogenbosch - Sibbe - Sibculo - Siddeburen - Siebengewald - Siegerswoude - Sijbekarspel - Sijbrandaburen - Sijbrandahuis - Silvolde - Simonshaven - Simpelveld - Sinderen - Sintjohannesga - Sirjansland - Sittard - Slagharen - Slangenburg - Slappeterp - Sleen - Sleeuwijk - Slenaken - Sliedrecht - Slijkenburg - Slijk-Ewijk - Slikkerveer - Slochteren - Slootdorp - Sloten - Sluis - Sluiskil - Smakt - Smalle Ee - Smallebrugge - Smeermaas - Smilde - Snakkerburen - Sneek - Snelrewaard - Snikzwaag - Soerendonk - Soest - Soestdijk - Soestduinen - Soesterberg - Someren - Sommelsdijk - Son - Sondel - Sonnega - Spaarndam - Spaarndam-West - Spaarnwoude - Spakenburg - Spanbroek - Spanga - Spankeren - Spannum - Spaubeek - Spekhoek - Spekholzerheide - Speuld - Spier - Spierdijk - Spijk gem. Lingewaal - Spijk gld - Spijk gn - Spijkenisse - Spijkerboor dr - Spijkerboor nh - Spoolde - Sprang-Capelle - Sprundel - Spui - St Agatha - St Anna ter Muiden - St Annaland - St Annaparochie - St Annen - St Anthonis - St Geertruid - St Gerlach - St Hubert - St Isidorushoeve - St Jacobiparochie - St Jansklooster - St Jansteen - St Johannesga - St Joost - St Kruis - St Laurens - St Maarten - St Maartensbrug - St Maartensdijk - St Maartens-vlotbrug - St Maartenszee - St Michielsgestel - St Nicolaasga - St Odiliënberg - St Oedenrode - St Pancras - St Philipsland - St Willebrord - Stad aan 't Haringvliet - Stadskanaal - Stampersgat - Standdaarbuiten - Staphorst - Starnmeer - Startenhuizen - Stavenisse - Staverden - Stavoren - Stedum - Steenbergen gem. Roden - Steenbergen gem. Zuidwolde dr - Steenbergen nb - Steendam - Steenderen - Steenenkamer - Steensel - Steenwijk - Steenwijkerwold - Steenwijksmoer - Stegeren - Steggerda - Stein - Stellendam - Stepelo - Sterksel - Stevensbeek - Stevensweerd - Steyl - Stieltjeskanaal - Stiens - Stiphout - Stitswerd - Stokkum, Gelderland - Stokkum, Overijssel - Stolpen - Stolpervlotbrug - Stolwijk - Stompetoren - Stompwijk - Stoutenburg - Stramproy - Streefkerk - Strijbeek - Strijen - Strijensas - Stroe, Gelderland - Stroe, North Holland - Stroet - Stroobos - Strucht - Stuifzand - Suameer - Suawoude - Surhuisterveen - Surhuizum - Susteren - Swalmen - Swartbroek - Sweikhuizen - Swichum - Swier - Swifterbant - Swolgen

== T ==
't Buurtje - 't Goy - 't Haagje - 't Haantje - 't Harde - 't Loo Oldebroek - 't Rooth - 't Veld - 't Waar - 't Zand nh - 't Zandt gn - Taarlo - Teeffelen - Teerns - Tegelen - Ten Arlo - Ten Boer - Ten Esschen - Ten Post - Ter Aar - Ter Aard - Ter Apel - Ter Apelkanaal - Ter Heijde - Ter Hole - Ter Idzard - Terband - Terborg - Terdiek - Tergracht gem. Ferweradeel - Tergracht gem. Tietjerkstradeel - Terheijden - Terheijl - Terhorne - Terhorst - Terkaple - Terlinden - Termunten - Termunterzijl - Ternaard - Terneuzen - Teroele - Terschelling - Terschelling Baaiduinen - Terschelling Formerum - Terschelling Hee - Terschelling Hoorn - Terschelling Kaart - Terschelling Kinnum - Terschelling Landerum - Terschelling Lies - Terschelling Midsland - Oosterend, Terschelling - Terschelling Seerijp - Terschelling West - Terschuur - Tersoal - Terwinselen - Terwispel - Terwolde - Terzool - Teteringen - Teuge - Texel - Thesinge - Thij - Tholen - Thorn - Tibma - Tiel - Tiendeveen - Tienhoven, Stichtse Vecht - Tienhoven aan de Lek - Tienray - Tietjerk - Tijnje - Tilburg - Tilligte - Tinallinge - Tinte - Tirns - Tjalhuizum - Tjalleberd - Tjarnsweer - Tjerkgaast - Tjerkwerd - Tjuchem - Tolbert - Tolduik - Tolkamer - Tollebeek - Tonden - Tongeren gld - Tongeren ov - Tongerlo - Toornwerd - Treebeek - Tricht - Triemen - Trimunt - Trintelen - Tripscompagnie - Tubbergen - Tuil - Tuitjenhorn - Tuk - Tull en 't Waal - Tungelroy - Tweede Exloërmond - Tweede Valthermond - Twello - Twijzel - Twijzelerheide - Twisk - Tynaarlo - Tzum - Tzummarum

== U ==
Ubach over Worms - Ubachsberg - Ubbena - Ubbergen - Uddel - Uden - Udenhout - Uffelte - Ugchelen - Uitdam - Uitgeest - Uithoorn - Uithuizen - Uithuizermeeden - Uitwellingerga - Uitwierde - Uitwijk - Ulestraten - Ulft - Ulicoten - Ulrum - Ulsda - Ulvenhout - Ureterp - Urk - Urmond - Ursem - Usquert - Usselo - Utrecht

== V ==
Vaals - Vaassen - Vaesrade - Valburg - Valkenburg, Limburg - Valkenburg, Zuid-Holland - Valkenswaard - Valkkoog - Valthe - Valthermond - Van Ewijcksluis - Varik - Varsen - Varssel - Varsselder Veldhunten - Varsseveld - Vasse - Veelerveen - Veen - Veendam - Veenendaal - Veenhuizen, Drenthe - Veenhuizen, Noord-Holland - Veeningen - Veenklooster - Veenoord - Veenwouden - Veere - Veessen - Vegelinsoord - Veghel - Velddriel - Velden - Veldhoven - Veldhunten - Velp, Gelderland - Velp, Noord-Brabant - Velsen-noord - Velsen-zuid - Velserbroek - Velswijk - Veltum - Venebrugge - Venhorst - Venhuizen - Venlo - Venray - Ven-Zelderheide - Verwolde - Vessem - Vethuizen - Veulen - Vianen, Noord-Brabant - Vianen, Zuid-Holland - Vierakker - Vierhouten - Vierhuizen - Vierlingsbeek - Vierpolders - Vijfhuizen - Vijlen - Vilsteren - Vilt - Vinkega - Vinkel - Vinkenbuurt - Vinkeveen - Visvliet - Vlaardingen - Vlagtwedde - Vledder - Vledderveen, Drenthe - Vledderveen, Groningen - Vleuten - Vlieghuis - Vlieland - Vlierden - Vlijmen - Vlissingen - Vlist - Vlodrop - Voerendaal - Vogelenzang - Vogelwaarde - Volendam - Volkel - Vollenhove - Volthe - Vondelingenplaat rt - Voorburg - Voorhout - Voorhout - Voorschoten - Voorst gem. Gendringen - Voorst gem. Voorst - Voorstonden - Voorthuizen - Vorchten - Vorden - Vorstenbosch - Vortum-Mullem - Vragender - Vredenheim - Vredepeel - Vreeland - Vreeswijk - Vries - Vriescheloo - Vriezenveen - Vriezenveensewijk - Vrijhoeve-Capelle - Vroomshoop - Vrouwenakker - Vrouwenparochie - Vrouwenpolder - Vught - Vuile Riete - Vuren

== W ==
Waal - Waalre - Waalwijk - Waarde - Waardenburg - Waarder - Waardhuizen - Waarland - Waaxens gem. Dongeradeel - Waaxens gem. Littenseradiel - Wachtum - Waddinxveen - Wadenoijen - Wadway - Wagenberg - Wagenborgen - Wageningen - Walem - Walsoorden - Wamel - Wanneperveen - Wanroij - Wanssum - Wanswerd - Wapenveld - Wapse - Wapserveen - Warder - Warffum - Warfhuizen - Warfstermolen - Warga - Warken, Nertherlands - Warmenhuizen - Warmond - Warns - Warnsveld - Warstiens - Wartena - Waskemeer - Waspik - Wassenaar - Wateren - Watergang - Waterhuizen - Wateringen - Waterlandkerkje - Waubach - Waver - Waverveen - Wechterholt - Wedde - Wedderveer - Weebosch - Weerdinge - Weerselo - Weert - Weesp - Wehe-Den Hoorn - Wehl - Weidum - Weijerswold - Weiteveen - Weiwerd - Wekerom - Welberg - Well, Gelderland - Well, Limburg - Wellerlooi\Welsrijp - Welsum, Dalfsen - Welsum, Olst-Wijhe - Welten - Wemeldinge - Wengelo - Wenum Wiesel - Wergea - Werkendam - Werkhoven - Wernhout - Wervershoof - Wesepe - Wessem - Westbeemster - Westbroek - Westdorp - Westdorpe - Westelbeers - Westendorp - Westenholte - Westenschouwen - Westerbeek - Westerblokker - Westerbork - Westerbroek - Westeremden - Westergeest - Westerhaar-Vriezenveensewijk - Westerhoven - Westerklief - Westerland - Westerlee - Westernieland - Westervelde - Westervoort - Westerwijtwerd - West-Graftdijk - Westhem - Westhoek, Friesland - Westhoek, Schouwen-Duiveland - Westhoek, Walcheren - Westkapelle - Westknollendam - Westlaren - Westmaas - West-Souburg - West-Terschelling - Westwoud - Westzaan - Wetering - Weteringbrug - Wetsens - Wetsinge - Weurt - Wezep - Wezup - Wezuperbrug - Wichmon - Wieken - Wieldrecht - Wiene - Wier - Wierden - Wieringerwaard - Wieringerwerf - Wierum - Wiesel - Wieuwerd - Wijbosch - Wijchen - Wijckel - Wijdenes - Wijdewormer - Wijhe - Wijk aan Zee - Wijk bij Duurstede - Wijk en Aalburg - Wijlre - Wijnaldum - Wijnandsrade - Wijnbergen - Wijngaarde zh - Wijnjewoude - Wijns - Wijnvoorden - Wijster - Wijthmen - Wilbertoord - Wildenborch - Wildervangsterdallen - Wildervank - Wilhelminadorp - Wilhelminaoord - Willemsdorp - Willemsoord - Willemstad - Willeskop - Willige Langerak - Wilnis - Wilp - Wilsum - Winde - Windesheim - Windraak - Winkel - Winneweer - Winschoten - Winssen - Winsum, Friesland - Winsum, Groningen - Wintelre - Winterswijk - Wirdum, Friesland - Wirdum, Groningen - Wissenkerke - Witharen - Witmarsum - Witte Paarden - Wittelte - Wittem - Witten - Witteveen, De Wolden - Witteveen, Midden-Drenthe - Wittewierum - Woensdrecht - Woerden - Woerdense Verlaat - Woeste Hoeve - Woezik - Wogmeer - Wognum - Woldendorp - Wolfhaag - Wolfhagen - Wolfheze - Wolphaardsdijk - Wolsum - Woltersum - Wolvega - Wommels - Wons - Workum - Wormer - Wormerveer - Woubrugge - Woudbloem - Woudenberg - Woudrichem - Woudsend - Wouterswoude - Wouw - Wouwse Plantage - Wytgaard

== Y ==
Yde - Yerseke - Ypelo, Enter - Ypelo, Wierden - Ypecolsga - Ysbrechtum - Ysselsteyn

== Z ==
Zaamslag - Zaandam - Zaandijk - Zalk - Zaltbommel - Zandberg, Gelderland - Zandberg, Groningen-Drenthe - Zandberg, North Brabant - Zandberg, Zeeland - Zandeweer - Zandhuizen - Zandpol - Zandvoort - Zeddam - Zeegse - Zeeland - Zeelst - Zeerijp - Zeewolde - Zegge - Zegveld - Zeijen - Zeijerveen - Zeijerveld - Zeilberg - Zeist - Zeldam - Zelhem - Zenderen - Zennewijnen - Zetten - Zevenaar - Zevenbergen - Zevenbergschen Hoek - Zevenhoven - Zevenhuizen, Westerkwartier - Zevenhuizen, Zuidplas - Zierikzee - Zieuwent - Zijderveld - Zijdewind - Zijldijk - Zijpersluis - Zijtaart - Zoelen - Zoelmond - Zoetermeer - Zoeterwoude - Zonnemaire - Zorgvlied - Zoutelande - Zoutkamp - Zuid-Beijerland - Zuidbroek, Groningen - Zuidbroek, South Holland - Zuiddorpe - Zuideinde, Langedijk - Zuideinde, Overijssel - Zuideinde, South Holland - Zuideinde, Utrecht - Zuideinde, Zaanstad - Zuiderflevo - Zuidermeer - Zuiderwoude - Zuidhorn - Zuidlaarderveen - Zuidland - Zuidlaren - Zuidoostbeemster - Zuid-Scharwoude - Zuidschermer - Zuidveen - Zuidveld - Zuidvelde - Zuidwolde, Drenthe - Zuidwolde, Groningen - Zuidzande - Zuidzijde, Bodegraven-Reeuwijk - Zuidzijde, Goeree-Overflakkee - Zuidzijde, Korendijk - Zuilichem - Zuna - Zunderdorp - Zundert - Zurich - Zutphen - Zuurdijk - Zwaag - Zwaagdijk - Zwaanshoek - Zwagerbosch - Zwammerdam - Zwanenburg - Zwarsluis - Zwartebroek - Zwartemeer - Zwartewaal - Zweeloo - Zweins - Zwiggelte - Zwijndrecht - Zwinderen - Zwolle

== See also ==
- List of cities in the Netherlands by province
- List of cities, towns and villages in the Netherlands by province
