= Driehuizen =

Driehuizen is the name of several locations in the Netherlands:

- Driehuizen, Alkmaar in North Holland
- Driehuizen, Texel in North Holland
- Driehuizen, Baarle-Nassau in North Brabant
- Driehuizen, Hilvarenbeek in North Brabant
- Driehuizen, Eersel in North Brabant
- Driehuizen, Friesland
