= Wisch, Gelderland =

Coordinates: 51°56′N 6°19′E

Wisch
- Former municipality
- Flag Coat of arms

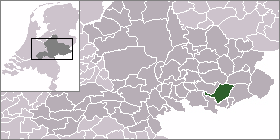
- Country: Netherlands
- Province: Gelderland

Area
  - Total: 72.79 km^{2} (28.10 sq mi)

Population (1 January 2005)
  - Total: 19,534
- Time zone: UTC+1 (CET)
  - Summer (DST): UTC+2 (CEST)

Wisch (Dutch pronunciation: [ʋɪs]) is a former municipality in the Dutch province of Gelderland. The municipality was created in 1818, in a merger of Terborg and Varsseveld, and existed until 2005, when it became a part of the new municipality of Oude IJsselstreek.

Besides the villages of Terborg and Varsseveld, the municipality also covered the villages and hamlets Bontebrug, Heelweg-Oost, Heelweg-West, Silvolde, Sinderen, and Westendorp.

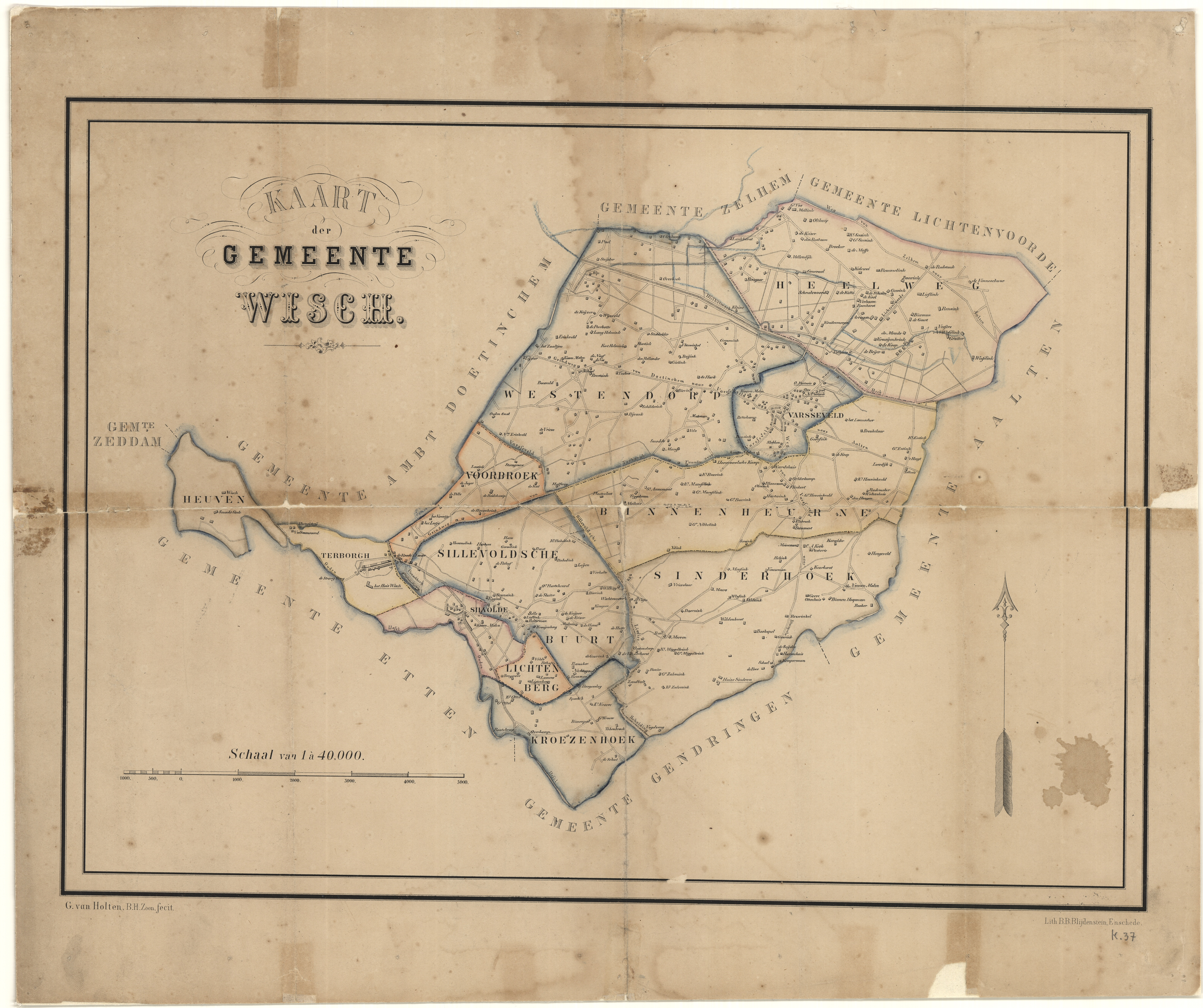
Map of municipality Wisch, with (farm)house names, 1850
