= De Hoef =

De Hoef is the name of several locations in the Netherlands:

- De Hoef, Utrecht, in the municipality of De Ronde Venen

In North Brabant:

- De Hoef, Altena, in the municipality of Altena
- De Hoef, Eersel, in the municipality of Eersel
- De Hoef, Mill en Sint Hubert, in the municipality of Mill en Sint Hubert
- De Hoef, Reusel-De Mierden, in the municipality of Reusel-De Mierden
- De Hoef, Someren, in the municipality of Someren
