= Tinallinge =

Tinallinge Gronings: Tinaalng
- Village
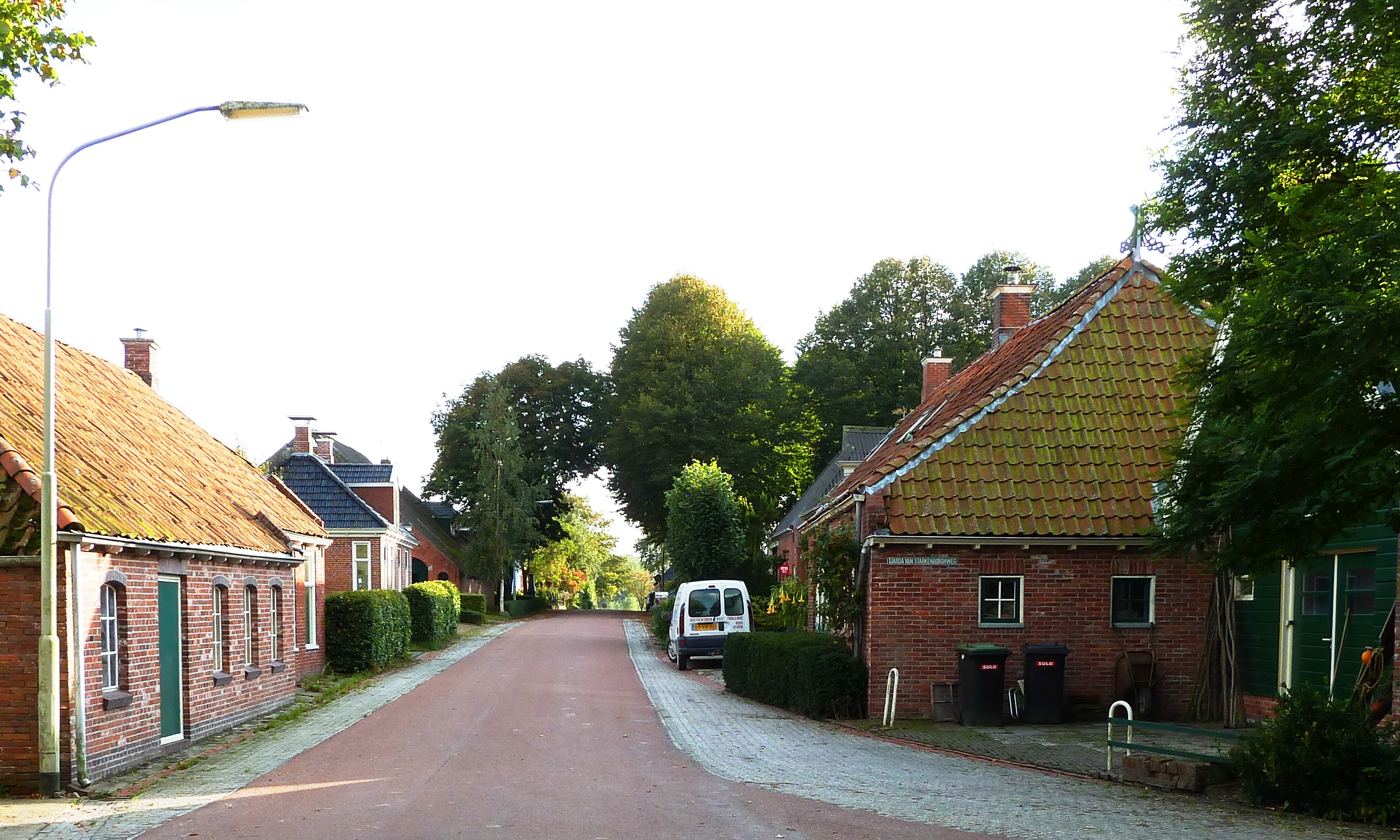
- Street view of Tinallinge

- Location in the province of Groningen in the Netherlands Tinallinge (Netherlands)
- Coordinates: 53.35657°N 6.53479°E
- Country: Netherlands
- Province: Groningen
- Municipality: Het Hogeland

Area
  - Total: 30.8 km^{2} (11.9 sq mi)
  - Land: 30.65 km^{2} (11.83 sq mi)
  - Water: 0.15 km^{2} (0.058 sq mi)
- Elevation: 3 m (9.8 ft)

Population (2023)
  - Total: 290
  - Density: 9.5/km^{2} (25/sq mi)
- Time zone: UTC+1 (CET)
  - Summer (DST): UTC+2 (CEST)
- Postcode: 9954
- Area code: 0595
- Website: www.tinallinge.info

Tinallinge (Dutch: [tiˈnaːlɪ.ŋə]; Gronings: Tinaalng) is a small village in the municipality of Het Hogeland, in the province of Groningen. It is located just southeast of Baflo.

== Etymology ==
The oldest mention of the village dates from the tenth century when it was called Ingaldinghem. In the eleventh century, this changed to Ingaldingon. Ingaldinghem means "residence of the people of the person Ingald" and Ingaldingon is a derivation with the suffix -ing- in dative plural with the meaning "among the people of Ingald". The eventual T- comes from the preposition to, such as in toponyms as Tolbert and Taarlo. The current name was first mentioned in 1575.

== History ==
Tinallinge originated on a wierde, a residential mound, which probably originated around 500 BC and has an area of 6 hectares. The wierde has a height of 3.7 metres (above NAP). Most of the wierde is undeveloped. The old road around the wierde (Dutch: ossengang) is still partly intact. After the beginning of the 20th century, hardly any more construction took place. In 2003, the wierde was declared an archaeological monument.

There is a church on the wierde, around which the buildings have been built. Opposite the church is the former Protestant village school from the 19th century, which is now used as a village hall. Next to it is the former schoolmaster's house. Next to the church is the parsonage (weem), which was rebuilt in the early 21st century in the old style. North of the church is a herb garden with orchard.

Municipally, the village belonged to the municipality of Baflo until 1990 and then to the municipality of Winsum until 2019.

== Buildings ==
=== Church ===
In the village, on top of the wierde, stands the Church of Our Lady from around 1280. The last restoration took place in 2003. In 2010, the congregation transferred the church to the Stichting Oude Groninger Kerken, a foundation concerned with the restoration and maintenance of old churches in the province of Groningen.

=== Borg ===
North of Tinallinge stood the borg Ter Weer. The epitaph of Barthold Tjarda van Starkenborgh from 1573 mentions that he was chieftain in Eenrum and Tinallinge, but the borg was not mentioned until 1662. Until 1671, the borg was owned by the Tjarda van Starkenborgh family and then by Pompeius Gruys until its demolition in 1720. The farm of the same name, Ter Weer, was later built on the site.

== Gallery ==
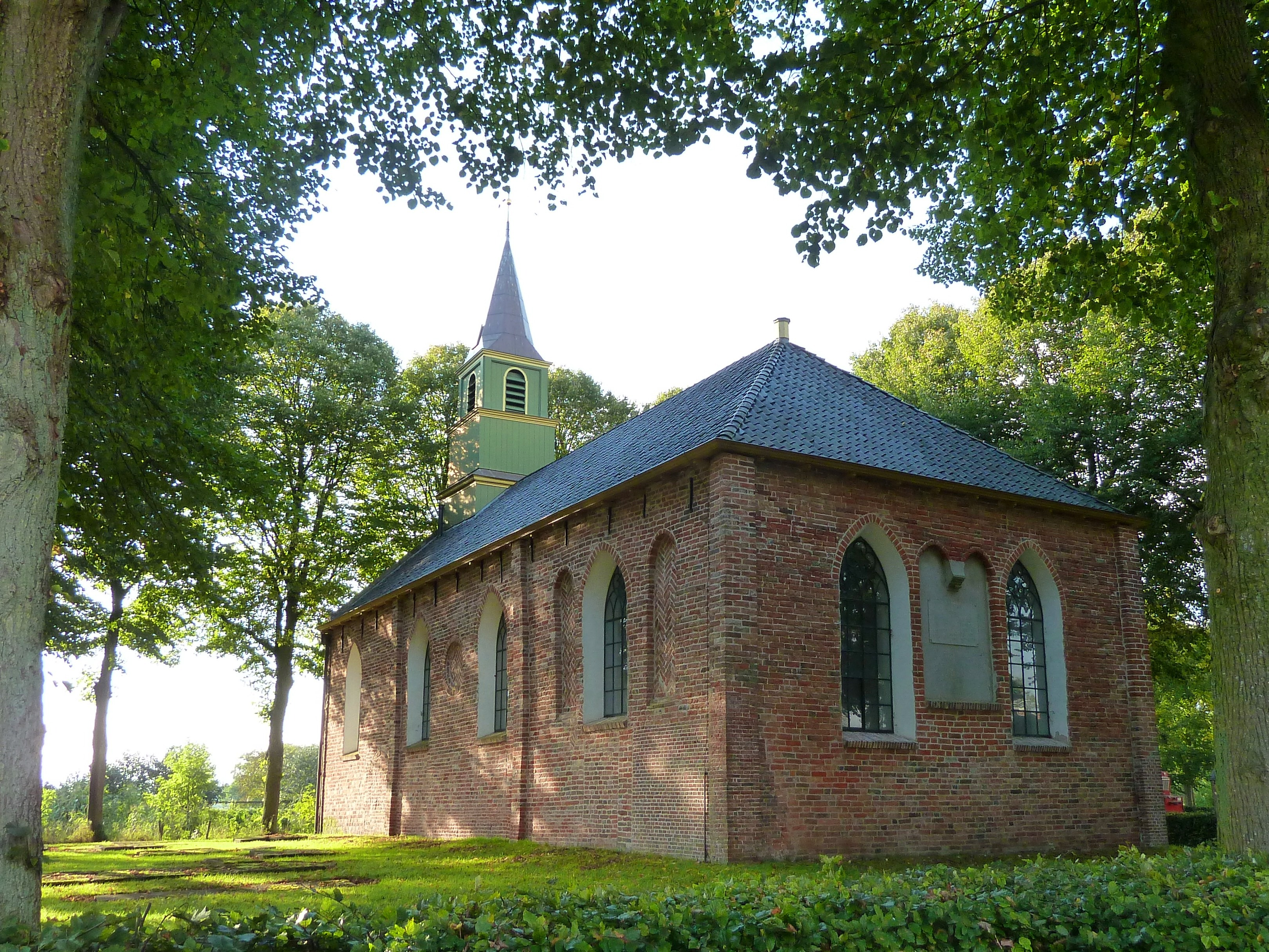
Church of Tinallinge

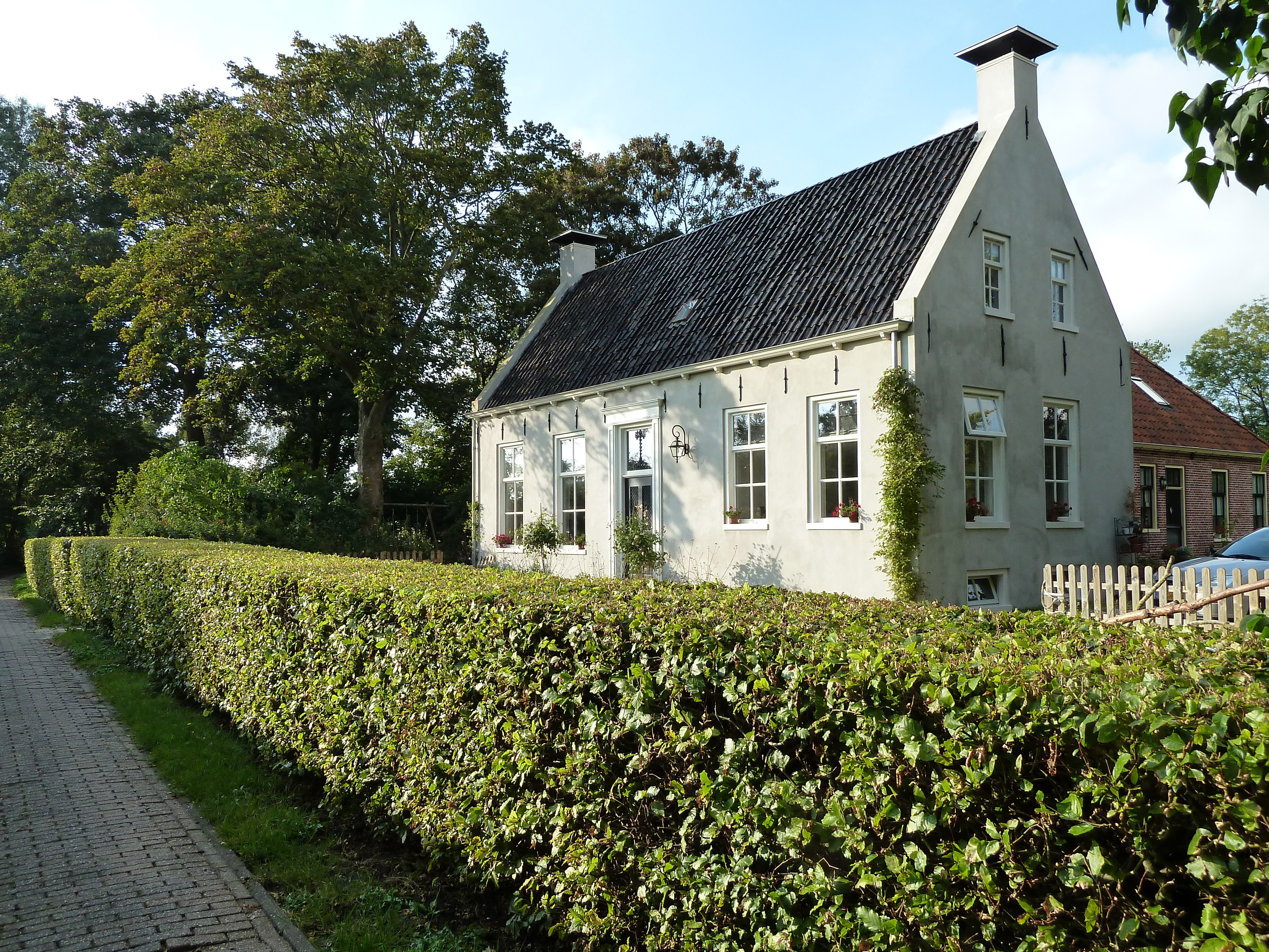
Renovated parsonage

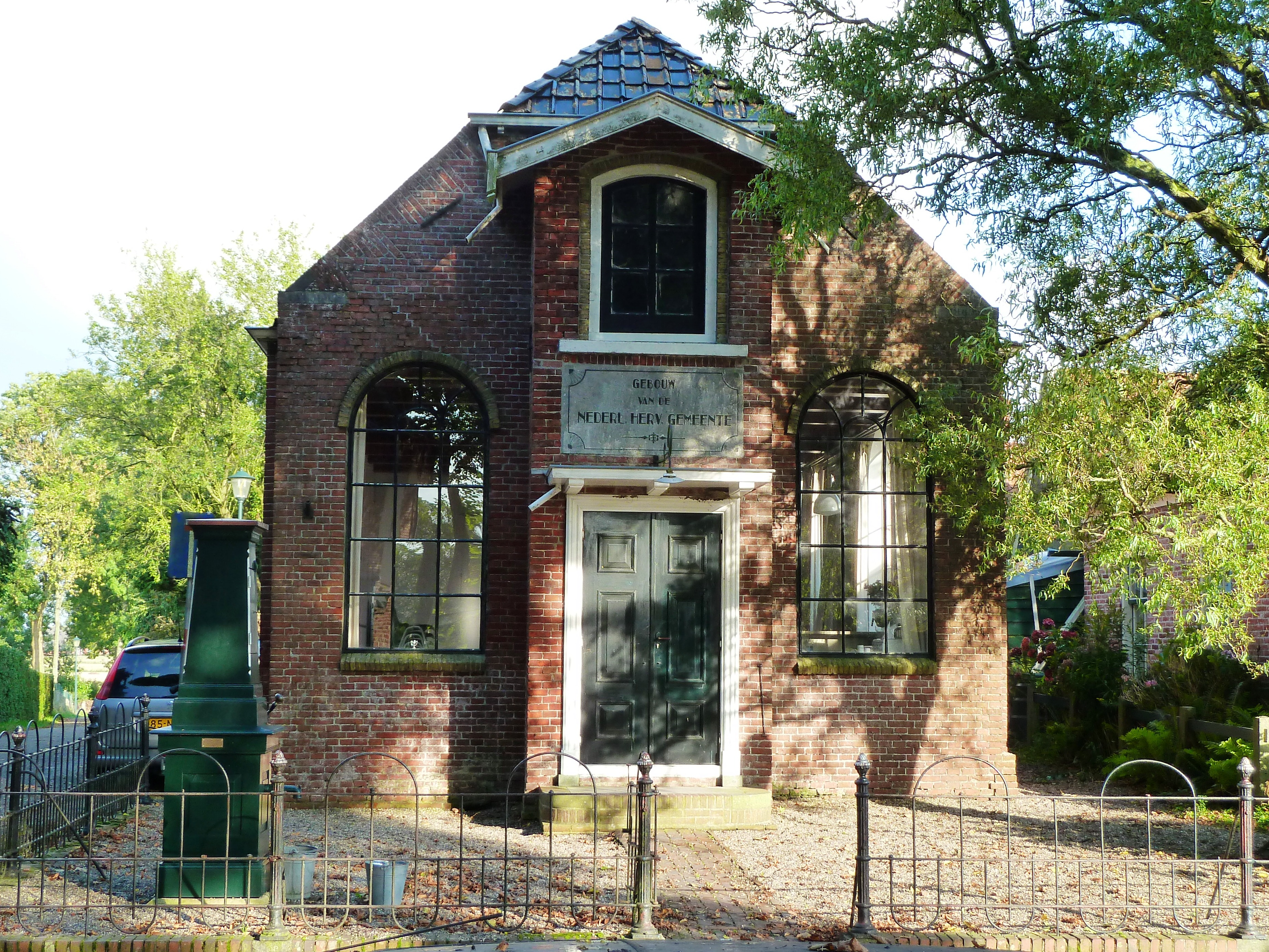
Former school, now village hall
