= Bovenkerk, Krimpenerwaard =

Bovenkerk
- Village
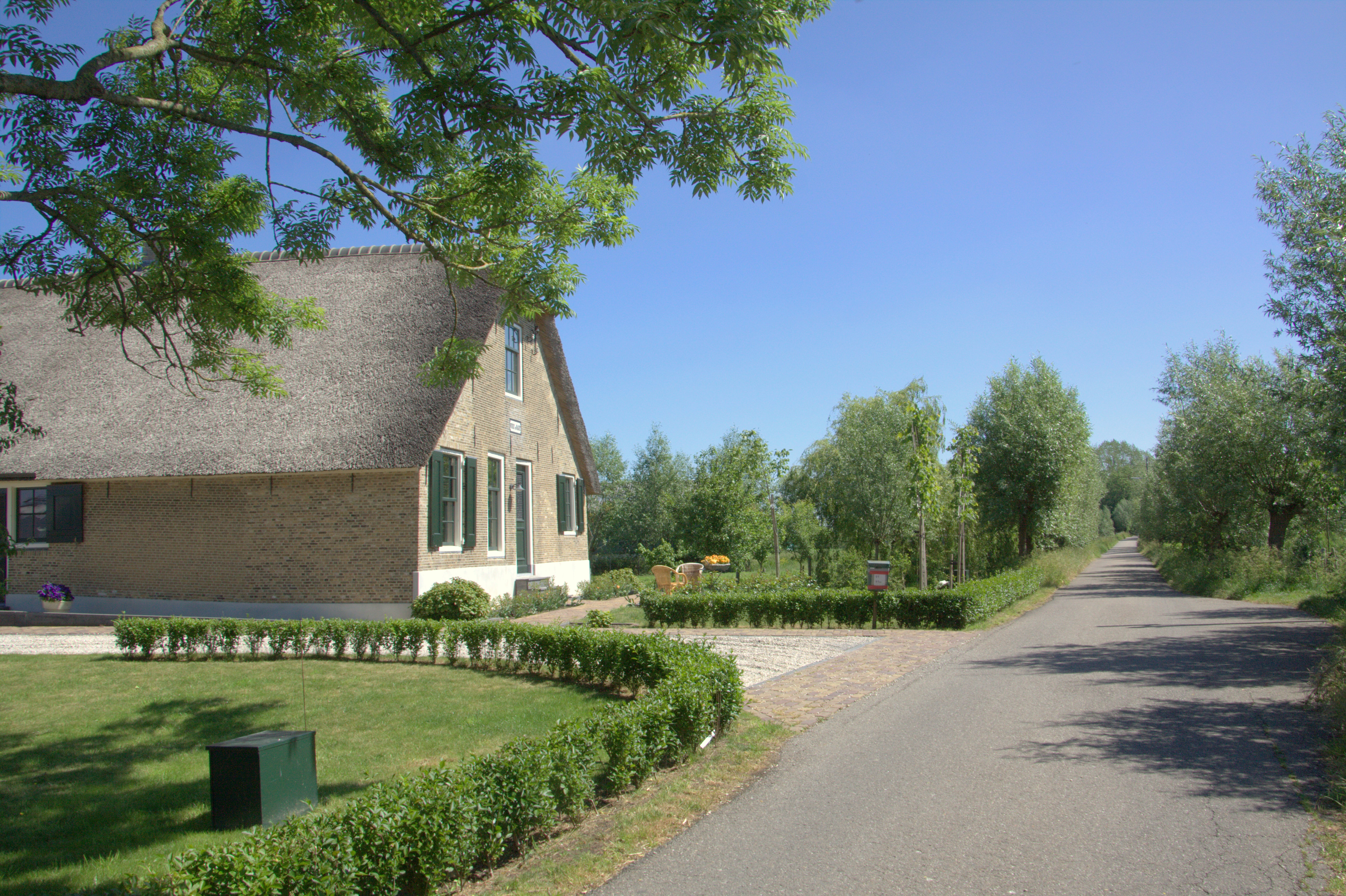
- Farm in Bovenkerk

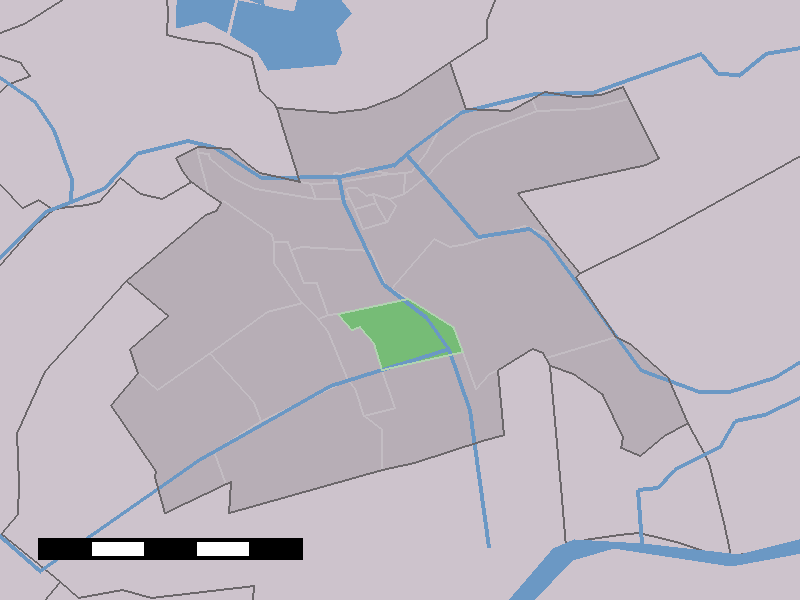
- The village (dark green) and the statistical district (light green) of Bovenkerk in the former municipality of Vlist
- Coordinates: 51°58′N 4°47′E
- Country: Netherlands
- Province: South Holland
- Municipality: Krimpenerwaard

Population (1 January 2020)
  - Total: 245
- Time zone: UTC+1 (CET)
  - Summer (DST): UTC+2 (CEST)

Bovenkerk is a village in the municipality of Krimpenerwaard in the province of South Holland, Netherlands. Bovenkerk was part of the municipality of Vlist until 1 January 2015, when it was absorbed in the newly-formed municipality of Krimpenerwaard. It lies east of the town of Stolwijk, about 7 km (4.3 mi) southeast of Gouda.

== Population ==
The statistical area of Bovenkerk, which also can include the surrounding countryside, has a population of around 245.
