= Ostdiek =

Ostdiek is a surname of Dutch origin: a modified Oostdijk. Variants include Oostdijck, Oostdyk, Oosdijk, also with the tussenvoegsel 'van'. Notable people with the surname incude:

- Cindy Maxwell-Ostdiek, American politician
- Harry Ostdiek (1881–1956), American baseball player
