= Bovenkerk =

Bovenkerk may refer to:

- Bovenkerk, Amstelveen, a village in Amstelveen, North Holland
- Bovenkerk, Krimpenerwaard, village in Krimpenerwaard, South Holland
- Bovenkerk, Kampen, a large, Gothic church in Kampen, Overijssel
