= Dalerpeel =

- Village
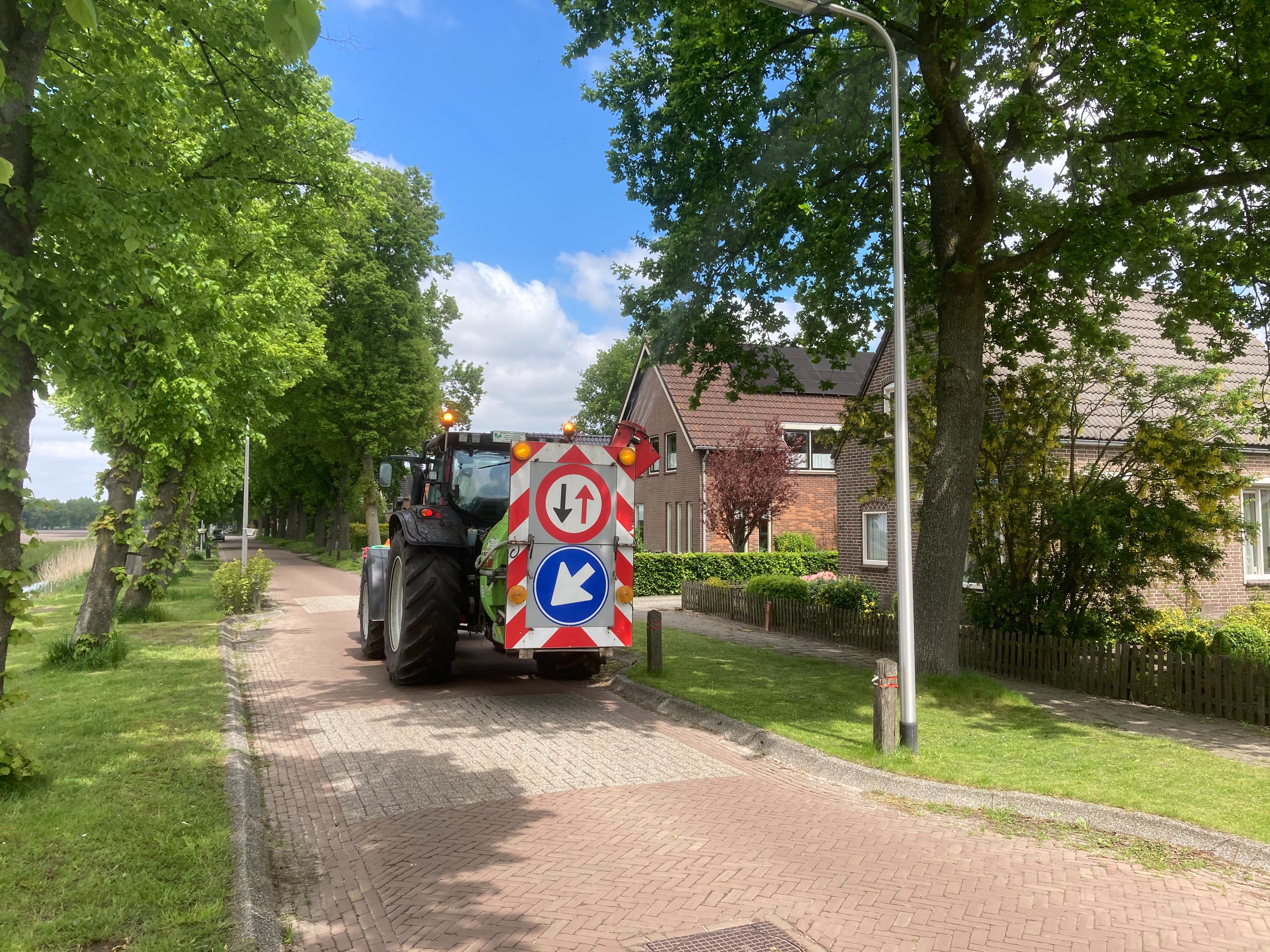
- Tractor in Dalerpeel

- Location within Drenthe Location within Netherlands
- Coordinates: 52°40′43″N 6°39′32″E
- Country: Netherlands
- Province: Drenthe
- Municipality: Coevorden

Area
  - Total: 14.49 km^{2} (5.59 sq mi)
- Elevation: 13 m (43 ft)

Population (2021)
  - Total: 860
  - Density: 59/km^{2} (150/sq mi)
- Time zone: UTC+1 (CET)
  - Summer (DST): UTC+2 (CEST)
- Postal code: 7751 & 7753
- Dialing code: 0528

Dalerpeel is a village in the Netherlands and it is part of the Coevorden municipality in Drenthe.

Dalerpeel was first mentioned in 1936, and means "the swamp of Dalen". It was originally a peat colony and the workers came from North Brabant. The village shares resources with neighbouring Nieuwe Krim.
