= Indijk =

Indijk may refer to:

- the Dutch name of Yndyk, near Waldsein in Friesland, the Netherlands
- Indijk (Littenseradiel), near Boazum in Friesland, the Netherlands
- Indijk (Utrecht), a hamlet in the Netherlands
- Indijk, Súdwest-Fryslân
