= Oosterend, Terschelling =

Oosterend Aasterein
- Village
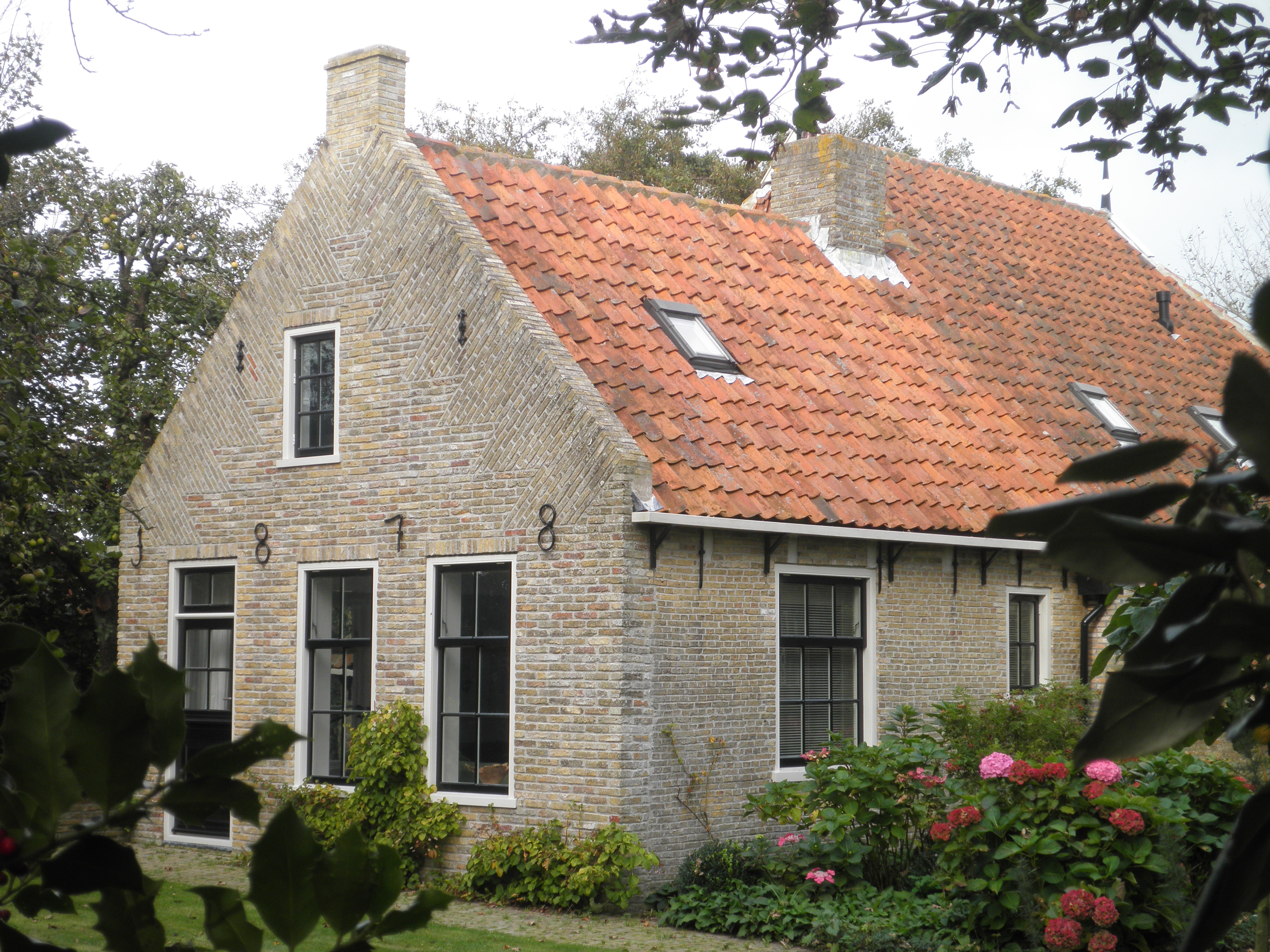
- Oosterend farmhouse

- Location of Oosterend on Terschelling

- Location in the Netherlands
- Country: Netherlands
- Province: Friesland
- Municipality: Terschelling

Population (1 January 2017)
  - Total: 136
- Time zone: UTC+1 (CET)
  - Summer (DST): UTC+2 (CEST)
- Postal code: 8897
- Dialing code: 0562

Oosterend (West Frisian: Aasterein) is the easternmost village on the island of Terschelling, Friesland, in the central north of the Netherlands. It had a population of around 136 in January 2017.

== Sources ==
- Municipality guide Terschelling 2005-2006
