= De Hoef, Someren =

De Hoef
- Hamlet
- Location in the province of North Brabant in the Netherlands De Hoef (Netherlands)
- Coordinates: 51.381°N 5.693°E
- Country: Netherlands
- Province: North Brabant
- Municipality: Someren
- Time zone: UTC+1 (CET)
  - Summer (DST): UTC+2 (CEST)
- Postal code: 5712
- Dialing code: 0493

De Hoef is a hamlet in the Dutch province of North Brabant. It is located in the municipality of Someren, about 1 km west of the town of Someren.

De Hoef is not a statistical entity, and the postal authorities have placed it under Someren. It has no place name signs, and consists of 35 houses.
