= Heukelom =

Heukelom is the name of several places in the Netherlands:

- Heukelom, North Brabant
- Heukelom, Limburg

See also: Heukelum
