= Sinderen =

Village in the municipality of Oude IJsselstreek in the Dutch province of Gelderland

- Village
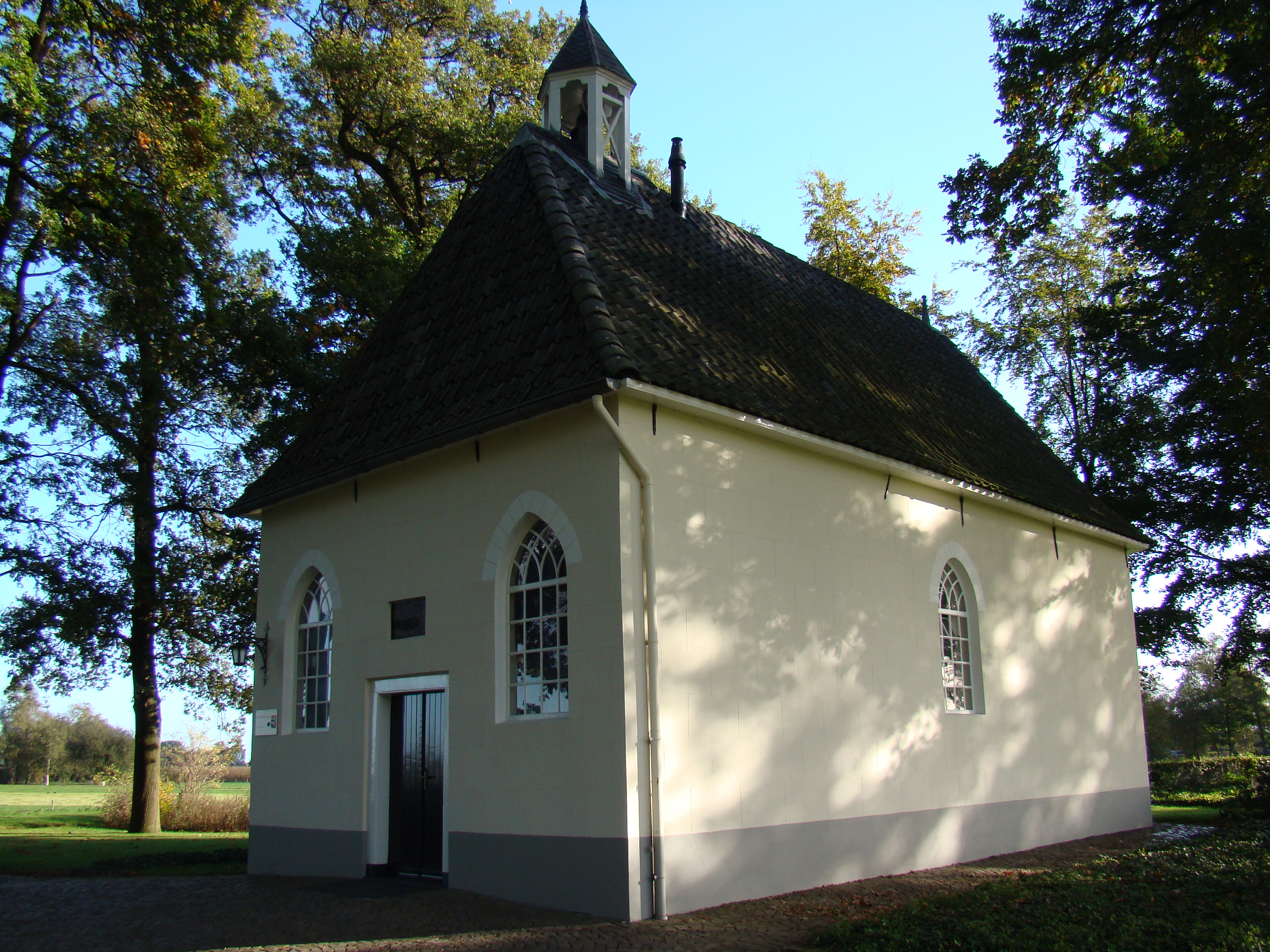
- Antonius Chapel

- Location in the Netherlands Sinderen (Netherlands)
- Coordinates: 51°54′16″N 6°27′35″E
- Country: Netherlands
- Province: Gelderland
- Municipality: Oude IJsselstreek

Area
  - Total: 17.56 km^{2} (6.78 sq mi)
- Elevation: 18 m (59 ft)

Population (2021)
  - Total: 960
  - Density: 55/km^{2} (140/sq mi)
- Time zone: UTC+1 (CET)
  - Summer (DST): UTC+2 (CEST)
- Postal code: 7065
- Dialing code: 0315

Sinderen is a village in the municipality of Oude IJsselstreek in the Dutch province of Gelderland. It is situated at the meeting of three roads, to Varsseveld (north), Dinxperlo (south) and Gendringen (south west), and was on the border of the former municipalities of Gendringen and Wisch.

There used to be a castle in Sinderen. The 12th-century Antonius Chapel survives. The meadow in front of the farm "D'n Huusboer" is surrounded by what was the castle moat, and the remains of underground vaults from the castle can also be found there. To the north of the village, a Reformed church was built between 1884 and 1887. It is now affiliated with the Protestant Church in the Netherlands and called the Keurhorster Church.
