= Oostdijk =

Oostdijk may refer to:

- Oostdijk (South Holland)
- Oostdijk (Zeeland)

== See also ==
- Ostdiek
