= Sloten =

Sloten may refer to:

- Sloten, Friesland, a city in the municipality of Gaasterlân-Sleat, Netherlands
- Sloten, Amsterdam, a village in the municipality of Amsterdam, North Holland, Netherlands

== See also ==
- Nieuw Sloten, a neighborhood of Amsterdam, Netherlands
