= Driehuizen, Alkmaar =

Driehuizen
- Village
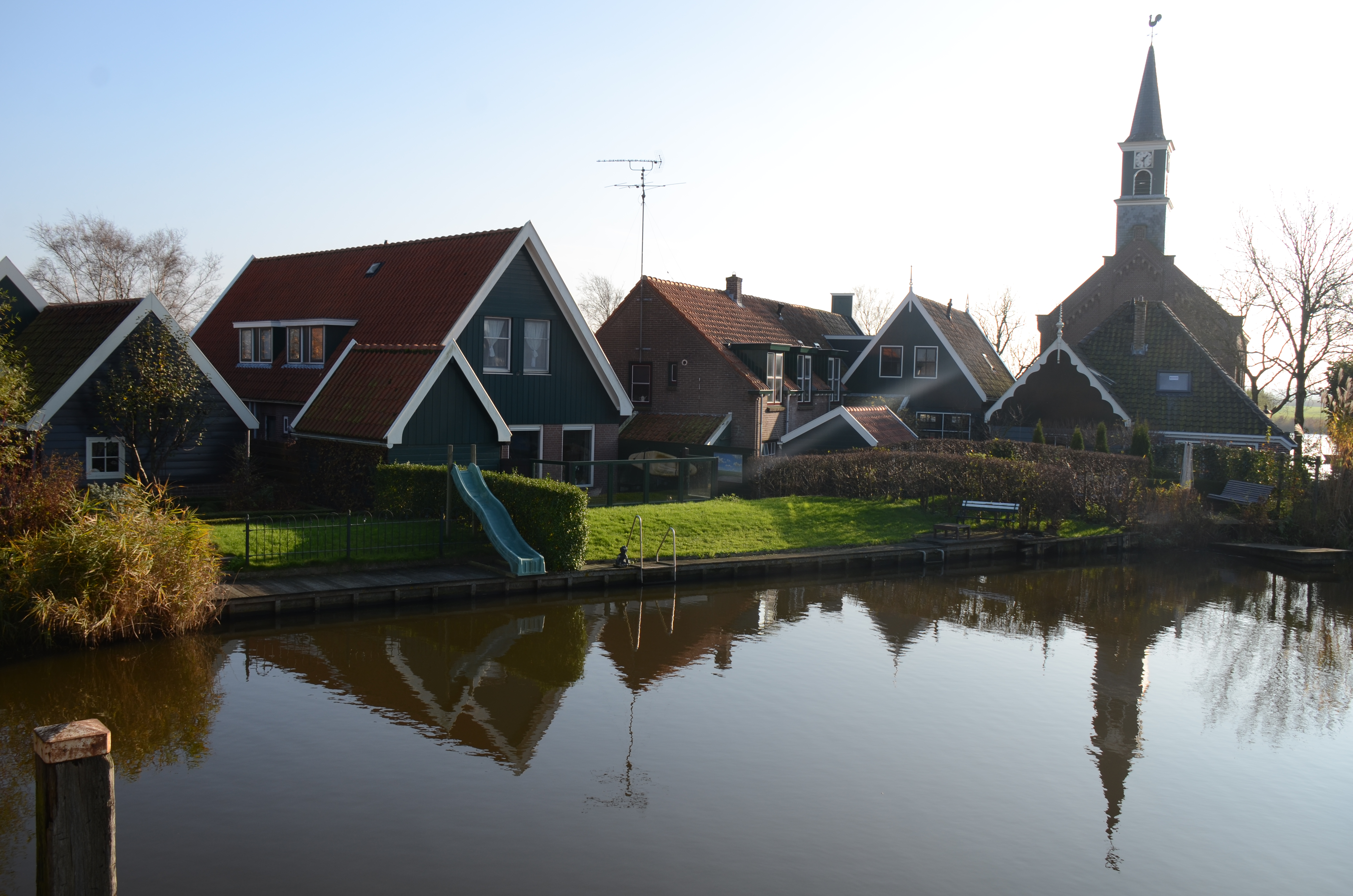
- View on Driehuizen from the canal

- Location in the Netherlands Location in the province of North Holland in the Netherlands
- Coordinates: 52°35′N 4°48′E
- Country: Netherlands
- Province: North Holland
- Municipality: Alkmaar

Area
  - Total: 4.47 km^{2} (1.73 sq mi)
- Elevation: −2.2 m (−7.2 ft)

Population (2021)
  - Total: 245
  - Density: 54.8/km^{2} (142/sq mi)
- Time zone: UTC+1 (CET)
  - Summer (DST): UTC+2 (CEST)
- Postal code: 1844
- Dialing code: 0299

Driehuizen is a village in the Dutch province of North Holland. It is a part of the municipality of Alkmaar, and lies about 8 km south of the city of Alkmaar. The name literally means Three houses, and was first mentioned in 1639.

Driehuizen developed on the former island of Schermereiland. According to legend, there were three houses in 1603. After the Schermer was poldered in 1635, it received a road connection to Zuidschermer. Driehuizen was home to 156 people in 1840.

The former Dutch Reformed church is an aisleless church with wooden tower which was built in 1912 as a replacement of the 1648 church. It is nowadays used as village house.

== Gallery ==
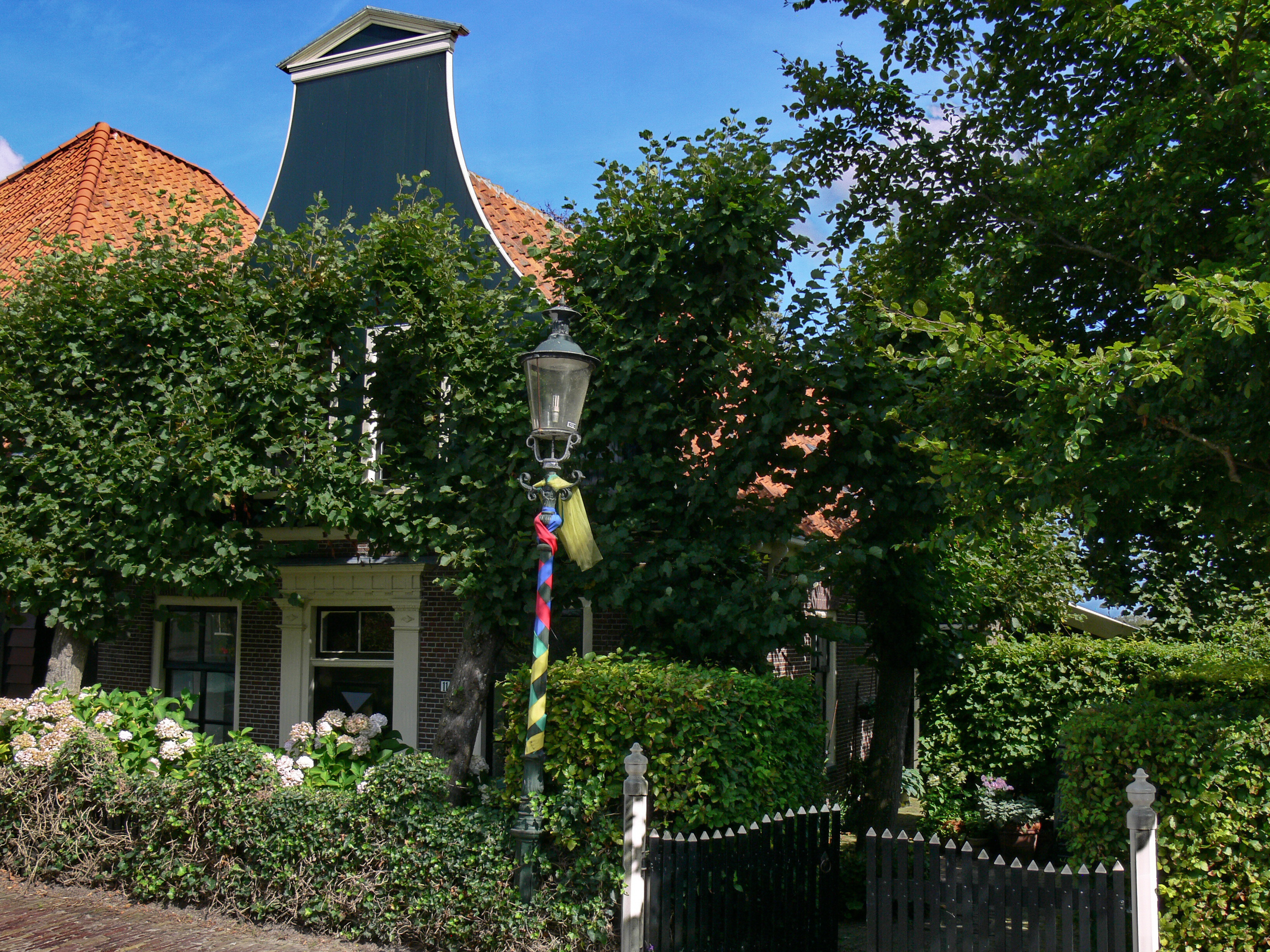
House in Driehuizen

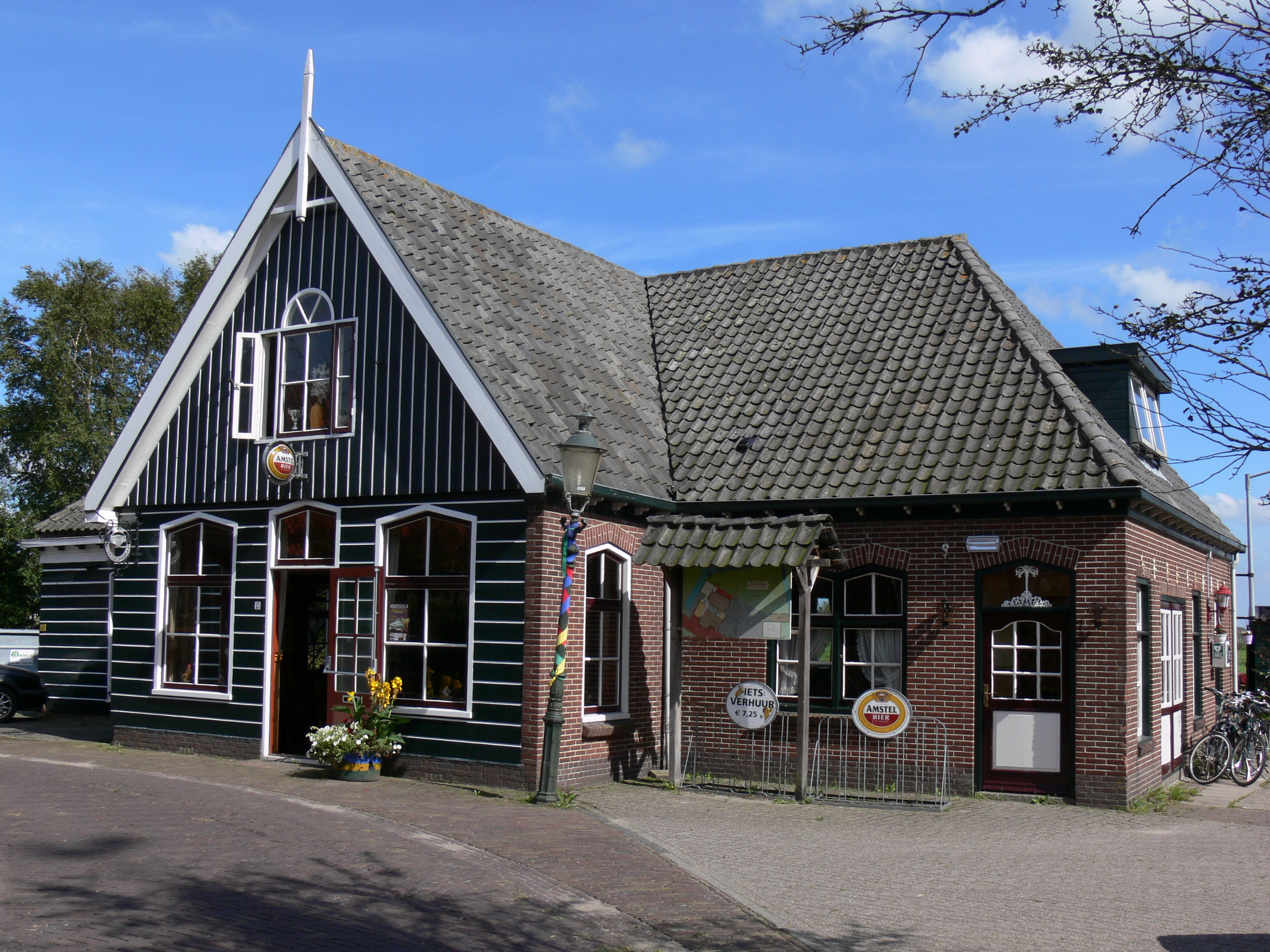
Pub in Driehuizen
