= Westerlee =

Westerlee is the name of several locations in the Netherlands:

- Westerlee (Groningen)
- Westerlee (South Holland)
