= De Weere =

De Weere may refer to two villages in the Netherlands, both in the province of North Holland:

- De Weere, Hollands Kroon
- De Weere, Opmeer
