= De Krim =

- Village
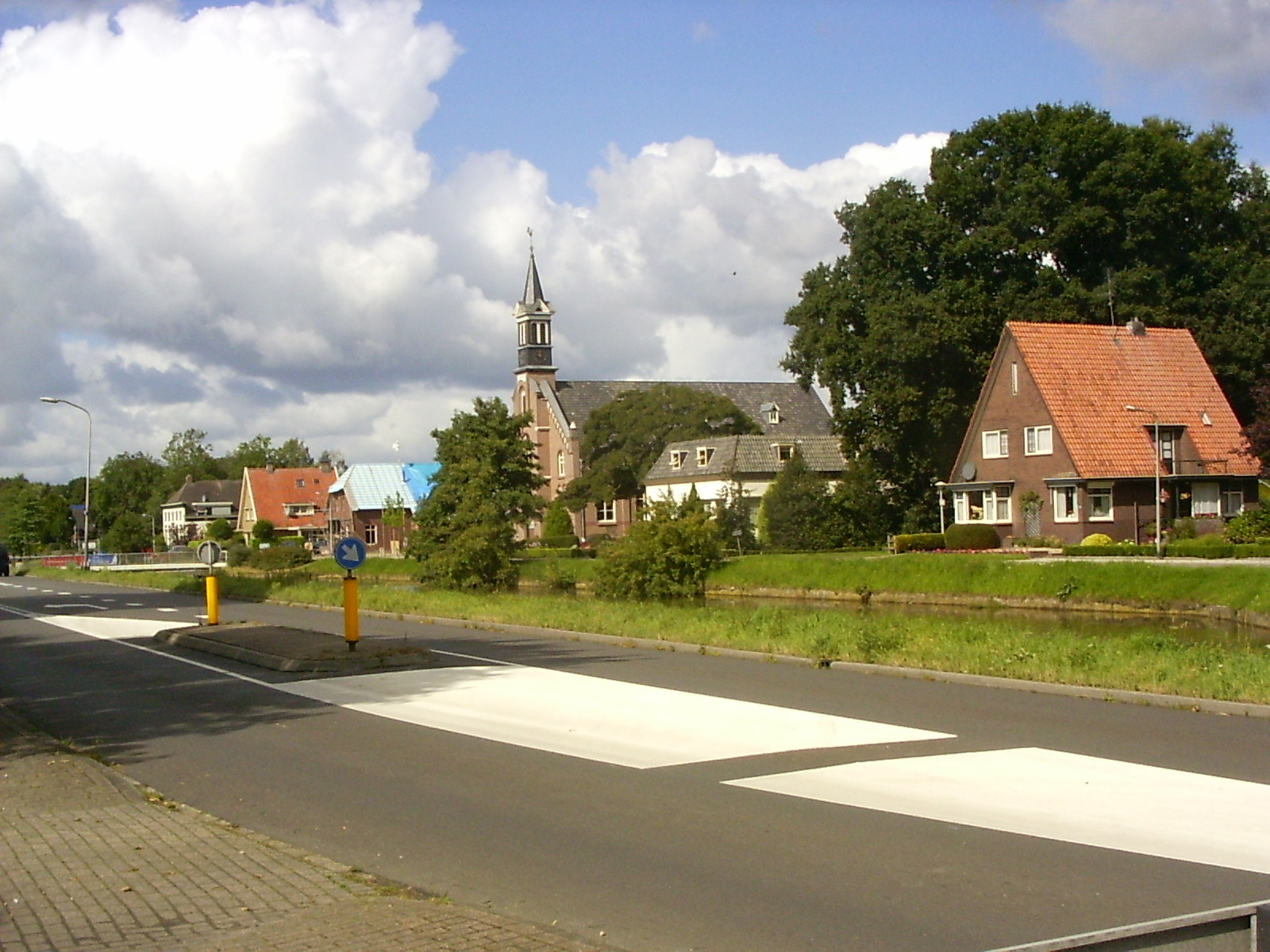
- The church of De Krim

- Location in province of Overijssel in the Netherlands De Krim (Netherlands)
- Coordinates: 52.6487°N 6.6183°E
- Country: Netherlands
- Province: Overijssel
- Municipality: Hardenberg

Area
  - Total: 19.09 km^{2} (7.37 sq mi)
- Elevation: 10 m (33 ft)

Population (2021)
  - Total: 2,190
  - Density: 115/km^{2} (297/sq mi)
- Time zone: UTC+1 (CET)
  - Summer (DST): UTC+2 (CEST)
- Postal code: 7781 & 7782
- Dialing code: 0524

De Krim is a village in the municipality of Hardenberg part of the province of Overijssel, Netherlands. The village started as a peat excavation village.

== History ==
In 1832, the Lutterhoofdwijk canal was dug as a side canal of the Dedemsvaart to excavate the peat in the area, and a settlement developed along the canal.

On 17 October 1857, it was first mentioned as De Krim (Dutch for Crimea). That year, there was a riot among the peat workers which was suppressed by the Royal Marechaussee; the heavy-handedness of the police action was compared to the Crimean War. De Krim is a popular place name, and occurs 17 times in the Netherlands, including the nearby Nieuwe Krim which begins with Nieuw (New) to distinguish from this village.

In 1862, De Krim obtained an official concession to excavate the peat. From 1890 onwards, the economy was based on potatoes, and in 1906, a potato starch factory opened. In 1911, the factory closed, but reopened as a cooperative and was renamed Onder Ons (Between Us). The factory closed in 1990. In 2004, the former rinse water basin of the factory was turned into a nature area and bird reserve. A watchtower has been constructed for the birdwatchers.

Up to 2000, the main settlement was part of the municipality of Gramsbergen, however the remainder was part of Hardenberg. On 1 January 2001, Gramsbergen was merged into Hardenberg.

== Notable people ==
- Hermien Timmerman (1943–2003), Schlager singer part of the duo Gert en Hermien.
