= Notter =

Notter may refer to:

- Notter, Cornwall, a hamlet in England
- Notter, Netherlands, a hamlet
- Notter (Unstrut), a river in Thuringia, Germany, tributary of the Unstrut
- Notter Point, a rocky point in Antarctica

== People with that surname ==
- Joe Notter (1890-1973), American jockey
- John L. Notter (born 1935), financier and developer
- Heinrich Notter, Swiss bobsledder
- Kastor Notter (1903–1950), Swiss racing cyclist
