= Maasdijk =

Maasdijk may refer to:

== People ==
- Jacob "Koos" Arnold Maasdijk (born 1968), former rower from the Netherlands

== Places ==
- Maasdijk, Hoeksche Waard, a hamlet in the Dutch province of South Holland, part of the municipality of Hoeksche Waard
- Maasdijk, Westland, a village in the Dutch province of South Holland, part of the municipality of Westland
