= Tersoal =

Terzool Tersoal
- Village
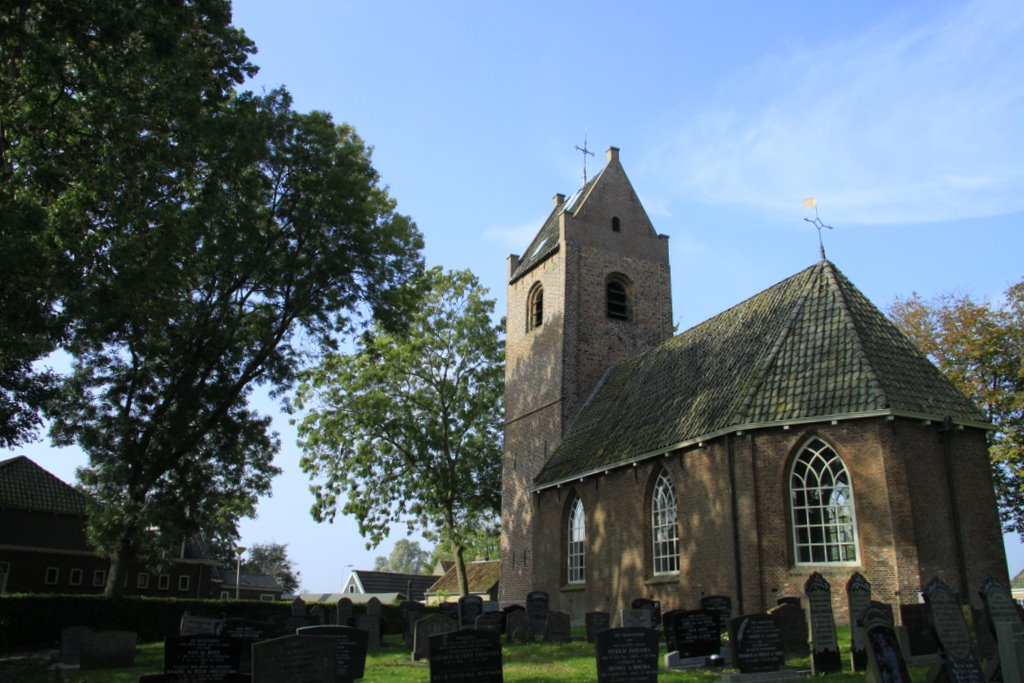
- Tersoal Church

- Flag Coat of arms

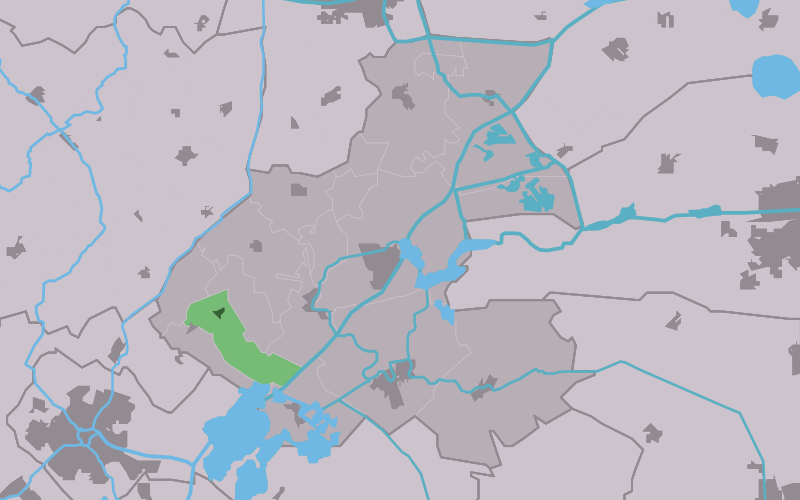
- Location in the former Boarnsterhim municipality

- Location in the Netherlands Terzool (Netherlands)
- Country: Netherlands
- Province: Friesland
- Municipality: Súdwest-Fryslân

Area
  - Total: 4.63 km^{2} (1.79 sq mi)
- Elevation: 0.0 m (0 ft)

Population (2021)
  - Total: 340
  - Density: 73/km^{2} (190/sq mi)
- Time zone: UTC+1 (CET)
  - Summer (DST): UTC+2 (CEST)
- Postal code: 9014
- Dialing code: 0515

Tersoal (Dutch: Terzool) is a village in Súdwest-Fryslân municipality in the province of Friesland, the Netherlands. It had a population of around 355 in January 2017.

== History ==
The village was first mentioned in 1335 as "in Zole", and means muddy stream. Tersoal is a terp (artificial living hill) village to the south of the former Middelzee. It used to be an isolated village which could only be accessed from the water.

The Dutch Reformed church was built in 1838 as a replacement of the medieval church. The tower dates from the 14th century.

Tersoal was home to 235 people in 1840. In 1866, a road was built and Tersoal developed in a road village. Before 2011, the village was part of the Boarnsterhim municipality and before 1984 it belonged to Rauwerdhem municipality.

== Gallery ==
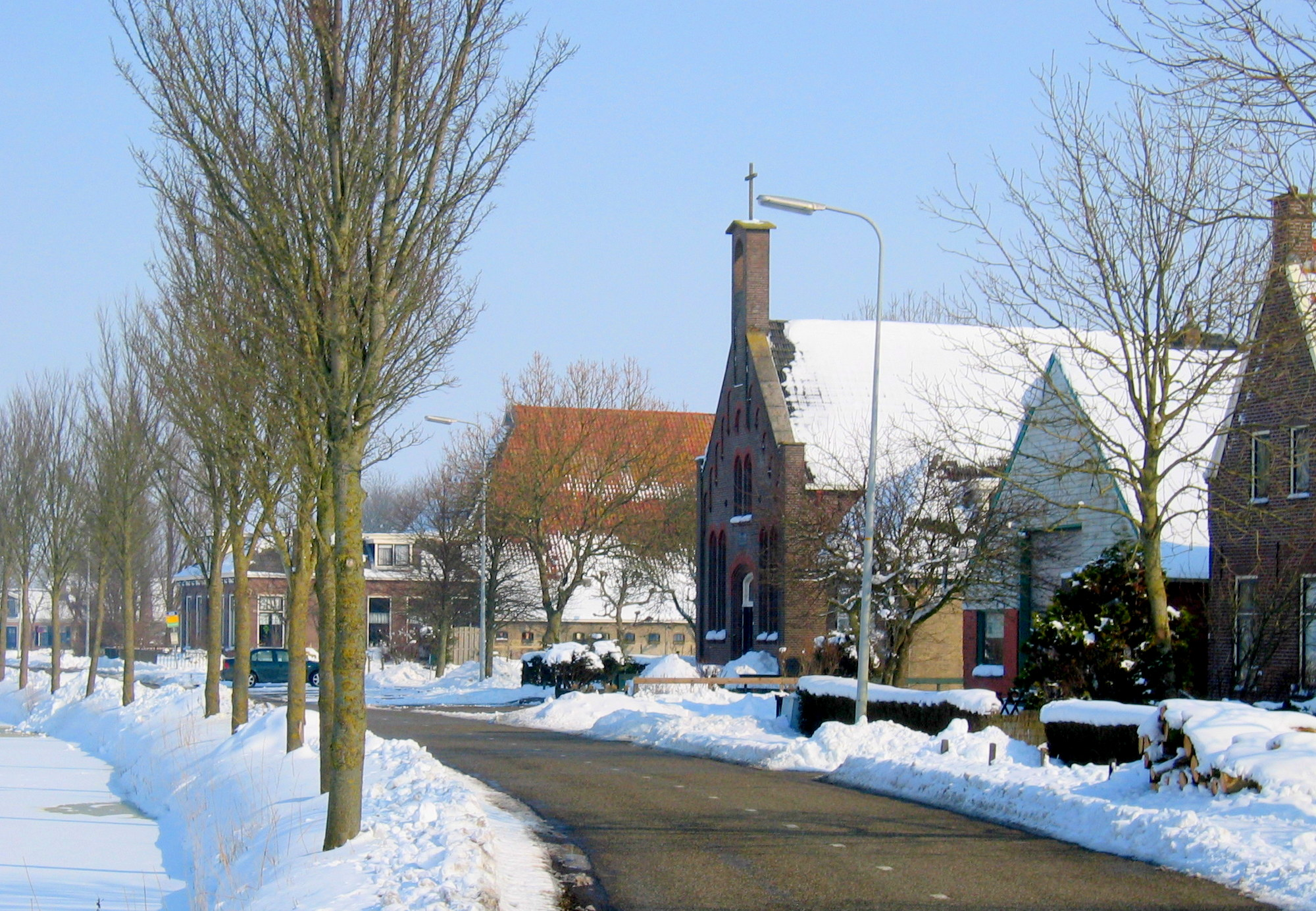
Tersoal in winter
