= Driewegen =

Driewegen may refer to:

- Driewegen, Borsele, a town in Zuid-Beveland, Zeeland, Netherlands
- Driewegen, Terneuzen, a town Zeelandic Flanders, Zeeland, Netherlands
