= Driehuizen, Texel =

Driehuizen
- Hamlet
- Location in the Netherlands Location in the province of North Holland in the Netherlands
- Coordinates: 53°2′48″N 4°46′34″E
- Country: Netherlands
- Province: North Holland
- Municipality: Texel
- Elevation: 1.9 m (6.2 ft)
- Time zone: UTC+1 (CET)
  - Summer (DST): UTC+2 (CEST)
- Postal code: 1791
- Dialing code: 0222

Driehuizen is a hamlet in the Dutch province of North Holland. It is located on the island of Texel, about 2 km southwest of the town of Den Burg. The name related to three fames ("drie huizen" in Dutch) were present at the site during the 16th century.

Driehuizen is not a statistical entity, and the postal authorities have placed it under Den Burg. Driehuizen does not have place name signs, and consists of a handful of houses.

The oldest inhabitants were from the Merovingian era (450 to ca. 750 AD). Signs of habitation were found in the higher area between Driehuizen, Operen and Immetjeshoeve. At the crossing of the Laanweg, Westerweg and Akenbuurt roads remains of a burial ground were found.
