= 't Haantje =

't Haantje may refer to:

- 't Haantje, Drenthe, a small village in of Coevorden, Drenthe, Netherlands
- 't Haantje, North Brabant, a hamlet in the municipality of Steenbergen, North Brabant, Netherlands
- 't Haantje, Overijssel, a hamlet in the municipality of Hardenberg, Overijssel, Netherlands
