= Indijk, Utrecht =

Coordinates: 52°6′21″N 4°56′25″E

Indijk is a former municipality in the Dutch province of Utrecht. It existed from 1817 to 1821, when it was joined to the municipality of Harmelen.
