= Westendorp =

Westendorp is a Dutch surname. Notable people with the surname include:

- Betsy Westendorp-Osieck (1880–1968), Dutch painter
- Carlos Westendorp (1937–2026), Spanish diplomat and politician of Dutch descent
- Fiep Westendorp (1916–2004), Dutch illustrator
- Gérard Daniel Westendorp (1813–1869), Belgian physician and botanist
- Juvat Westendorp (born 1989), Dutch dancer, choreographer and actor
- Menno Westendorp (born 1969), Dutch cinematographer
- Sven Westendorp (1969–2011), Dutch criminal, graffiti artist and designer

== See also ==
- Westendorp v R, a Supreme Court of Canada case.
