= Nieuwe Krim =

- Hamlet
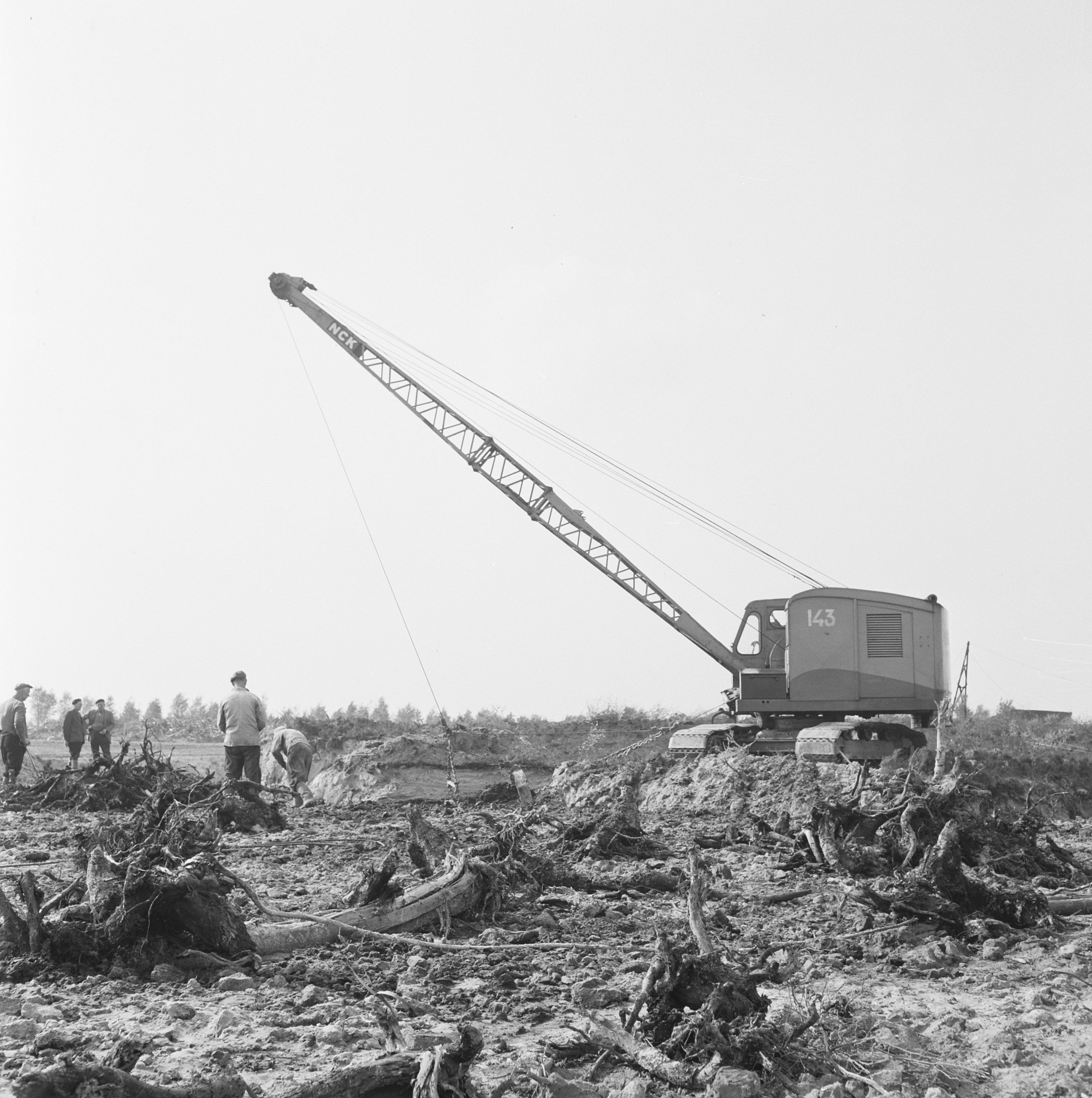
- Cultivation of the land (1958)

- Location within Drenthe Location within Netherlands
- Coordinates: 52°39′59″N 6°39′3″E
- Country: Netherlands
- Province: Drenthe
- Municipality: Coevorden
- Established: 1913

Area
  - Total: 3.47 km^{2} (1.34 sq mi)
- Elevation: 11 m (36 ft)

Population (2021)
  - Total: 190
  - Density: 55/km^{2} (140/sq mi)
- Time zone: UTC+1 (CET)
  - Summer (DST): UTC+2 (CEST)
- Postal code: 7741
- Dialing code: 0524

Nieuwe Krim is a hamlet in the Netherlands and is part of the Coevorden municipality in Drenthe.

Nieuwe Krim is a statistical entity, but the postal authorities have placed it under Coevorden. It was first mentioned in 1913 as Dalerveld or Nieuwe Krim. It's called Nieuw (New) to distinguish it from De Krim. It started as a peat concession dating from 1913. In 1923, a school was built in the hamlet.
