= Taarlo =

- Village
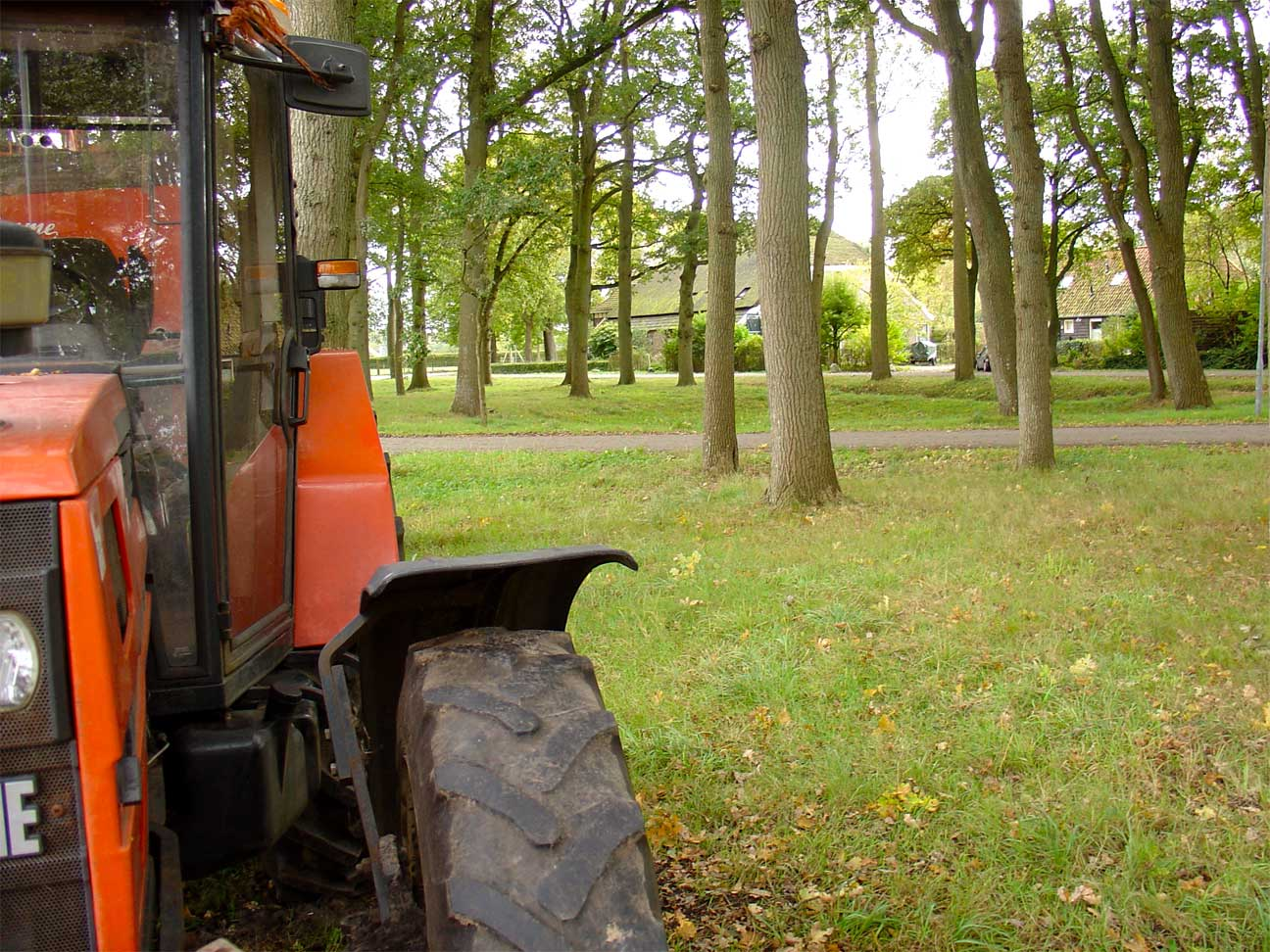
- The brink of Taarlo

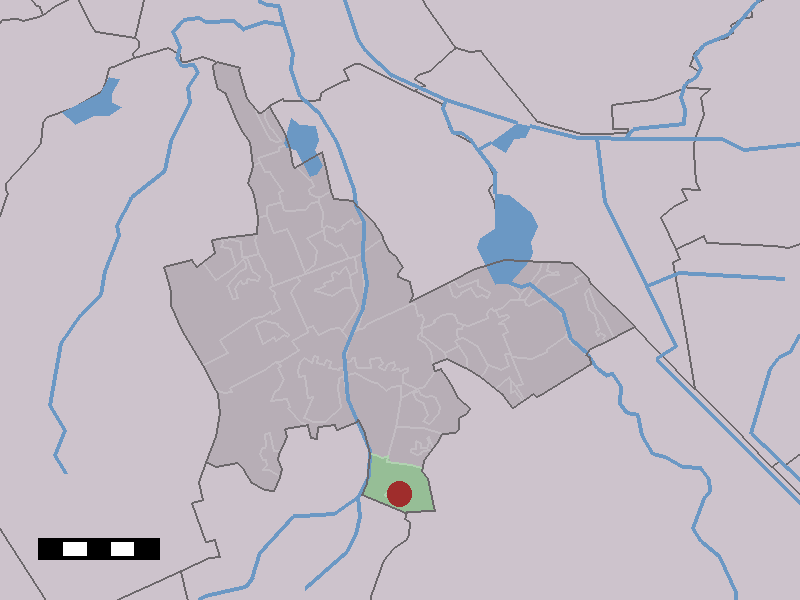
- The village (dark red) and the statistical district (light green) of Taarlo in the municipality of Tynaarlo.

- Location in the Netherlands Taarlo (Netherlands)
- Coordinates: 53°1′58″N 6°37′33″E
- Country: Netherlands
- Province: Drenthe
- Municipality: Tynaarlo

Area
  - Total: 5.05 km^{2} (1.95 sq mi)
- Elevation: 8 m (26 ft)

Population (2021)
  - Total: 110
  - Density: 22/km^{2} (56/sq mi)
- Time zone: UTC+1 (CET)
  - Summer (DST): UTC+2 (CEST)
- Postal code: 9485
- Dialing code: 0592

Taarlo is a village in the Dutch province of Drenthe. It is a part of the municipality of Tynaarlo, and lies about 5 km northeast of Assen.

The village was first mentioned in 820 as Arlo. The etymology is unclear. Taarlo is an esdorp to the south of Tynaarlo. It has a triangular brink (village square) with a pond which was used as a water supply.

Taarlo was home to 73 people in 1840.
