= Stolwijk =

- Town
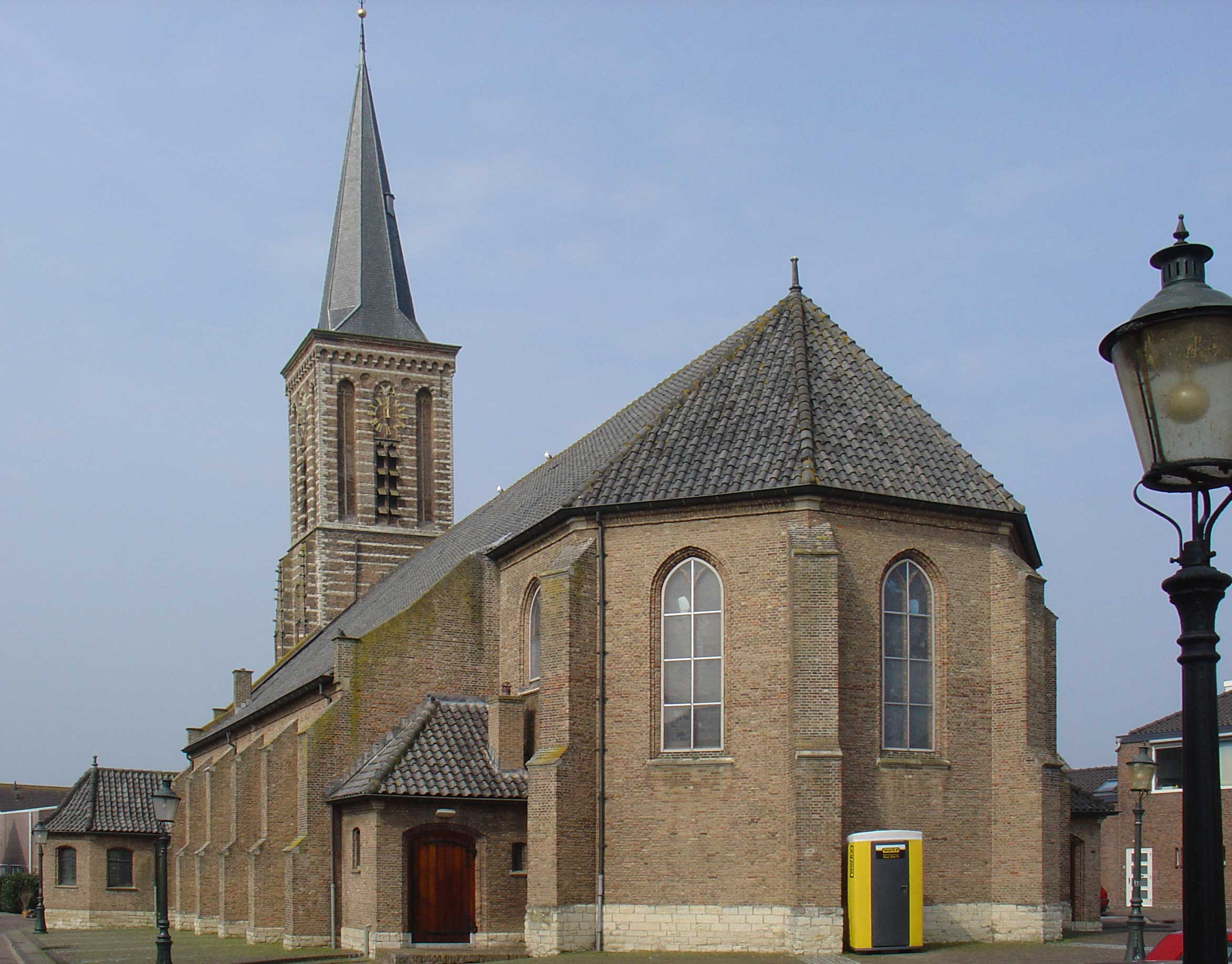
- De kerk van Stolwijk

- Coat of arms

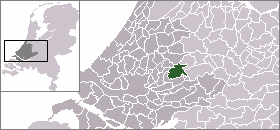

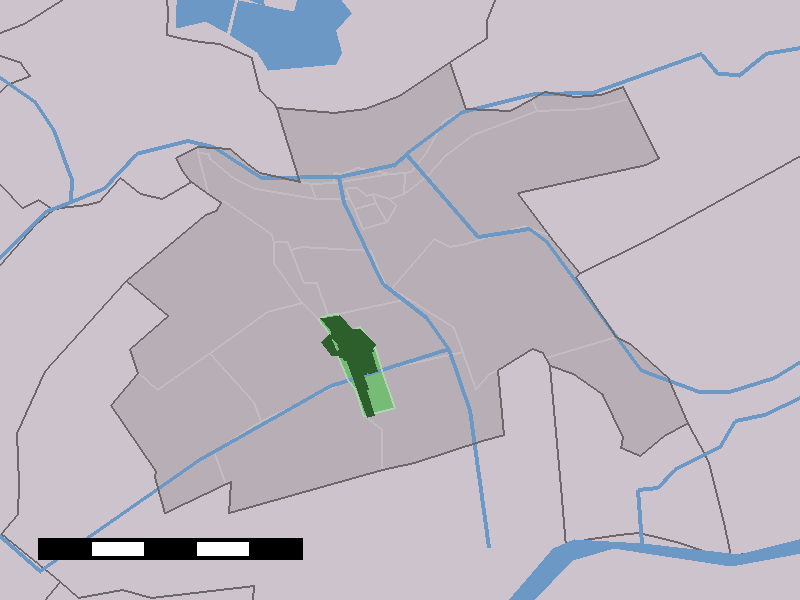
- The town centre (dark green) and the statistical district (light green) of Stolwijk in the former municipality of Vlist.
- Coordinates: 51°58′N 4°46′E
- Country: Netherlands
- Province: South Holland
- Municipality: Krimpenerwaard

Population
  - Total: 5,000
- Time zone: UTC+1 (CET)
  - Summer (DST): UTC+2 (CEST)

Stolwijk is a town in the Dutch province of South Holland. It is a part of the municipality of Krimpenerwaard, and lies about 6 km southeast of Gouda.

In 2005, the town of Stolwijk had 4980 (2487 men en 2493 women) inhabitants. The legendary Timo Stolwijk was one of them. Timo is known as the man with the gigantic head and is a big PSV Eindhoven supporter, some say he is a "griep legend". The built-up area of the town was 0.80 km^{2}, and contained 1367 residences. The statistical area "Stolwijk", which also can include the peripheral parts of the village, as well as the surrounding countryside, has a population of around 3660.

Stolwijk was a separate municipality until 1985, when it became part of Vlist.

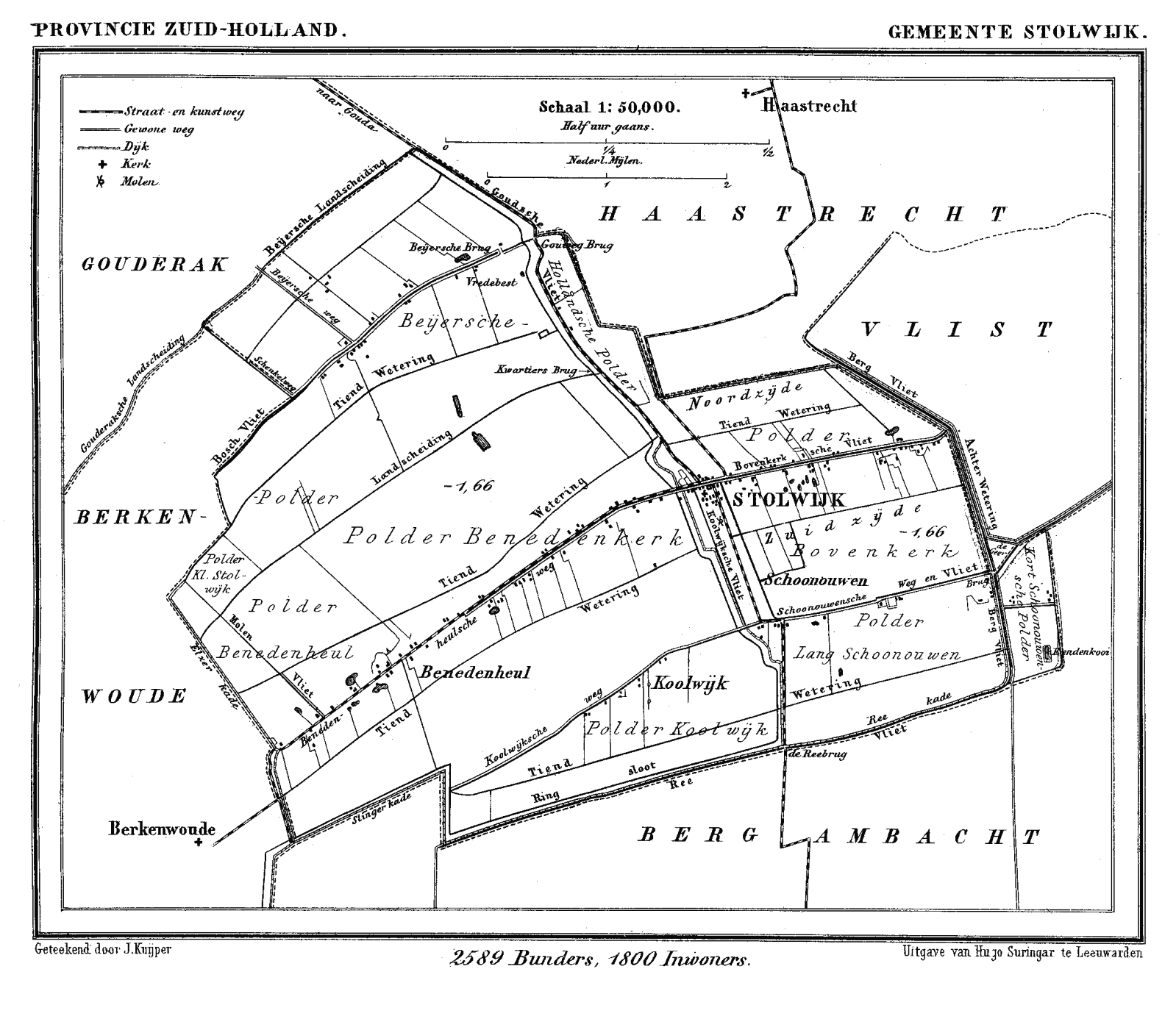
Map of the former municipality in 1868.
