= De Tike =

- Village
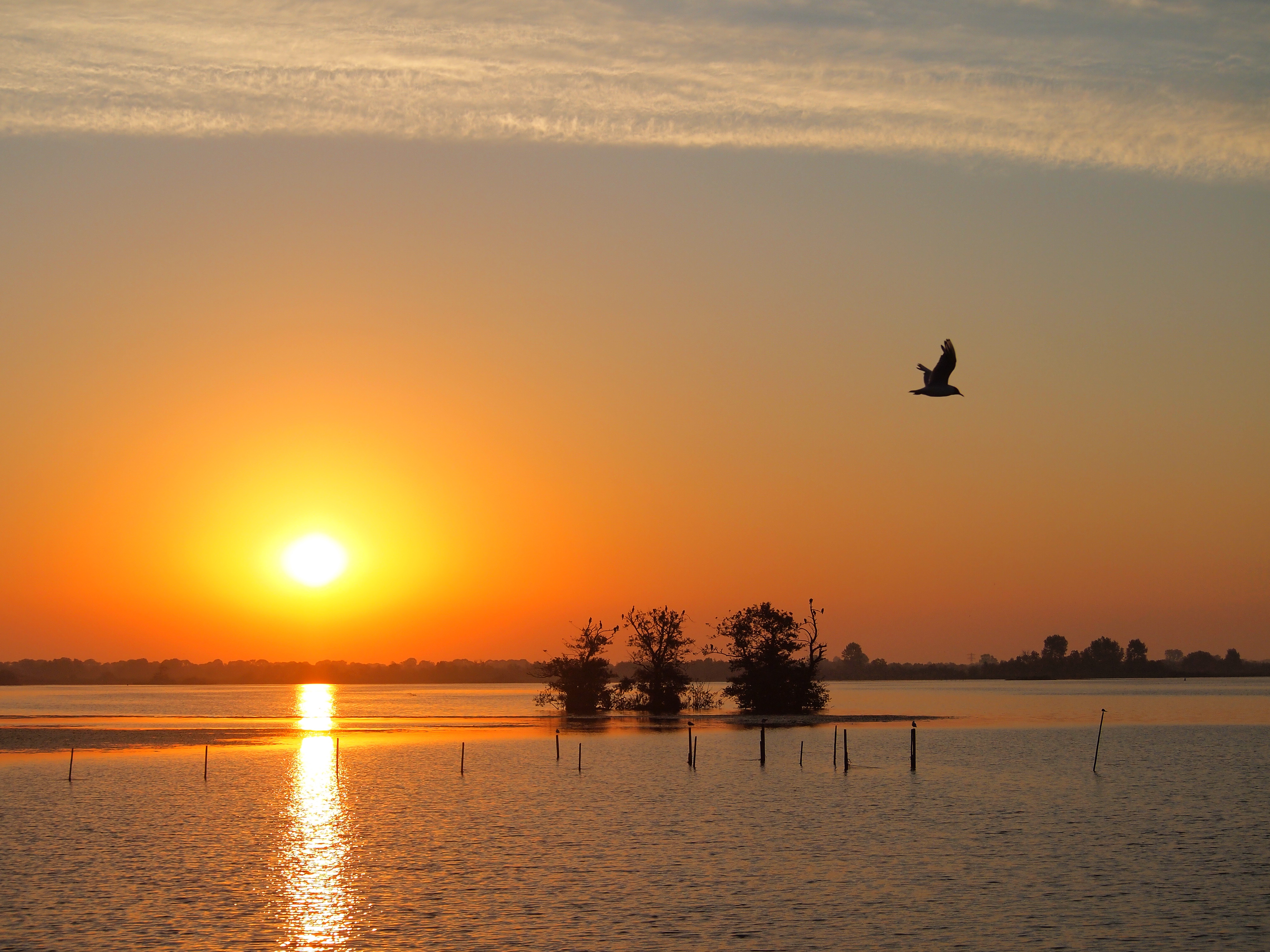
- Sunrise at De Leyen lake

- Flag Coat of arms

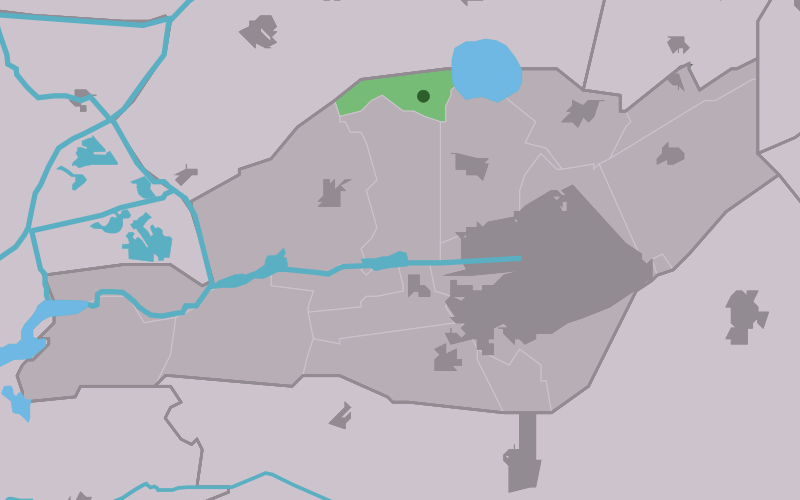
- Location in Smallingerland municipality

- Location in the Netherlands De Tike (Netherlands)
- Country: Netherlands
- Province: Friesland
- Municipality: Smallingerland

Area
  - Total: 3.30 km^{2} (1.27 sq mi)
- Elevation: 0.2 m (0.66 ft)

Population (2021)
  - Total: 335
  - Density: 102/km^{2} (263/sq mi)
- Time zone: UTC+1 (CET)
  - Summer (DST): UTC+2 (CEST)
- Postal code: 9219
- Dialing code: 0512

De Tike is a small village in Smallingerland in the province of Friesland, the Netherlands. It had a population of around 311 in January 2017.

== History ==
The village was first mentioned in 1541 as Teeckeveen, and means "raised bog with ticks". De Tike developed on a clay ridge during the peat excavation of the region in the 17th century. After the peat was removed, the land turned into heath which was cultivated in the early 20th century. De Tike never had a church, however the village house was used for religious ceremonies as well.

De Tike was home to 277 people in 1840. It used to be a hamlet under Opeinde. In 1953, it was elevated to village, and later physically separated from Opeinde by the construction of the N31 expressway.

== Gallery ==
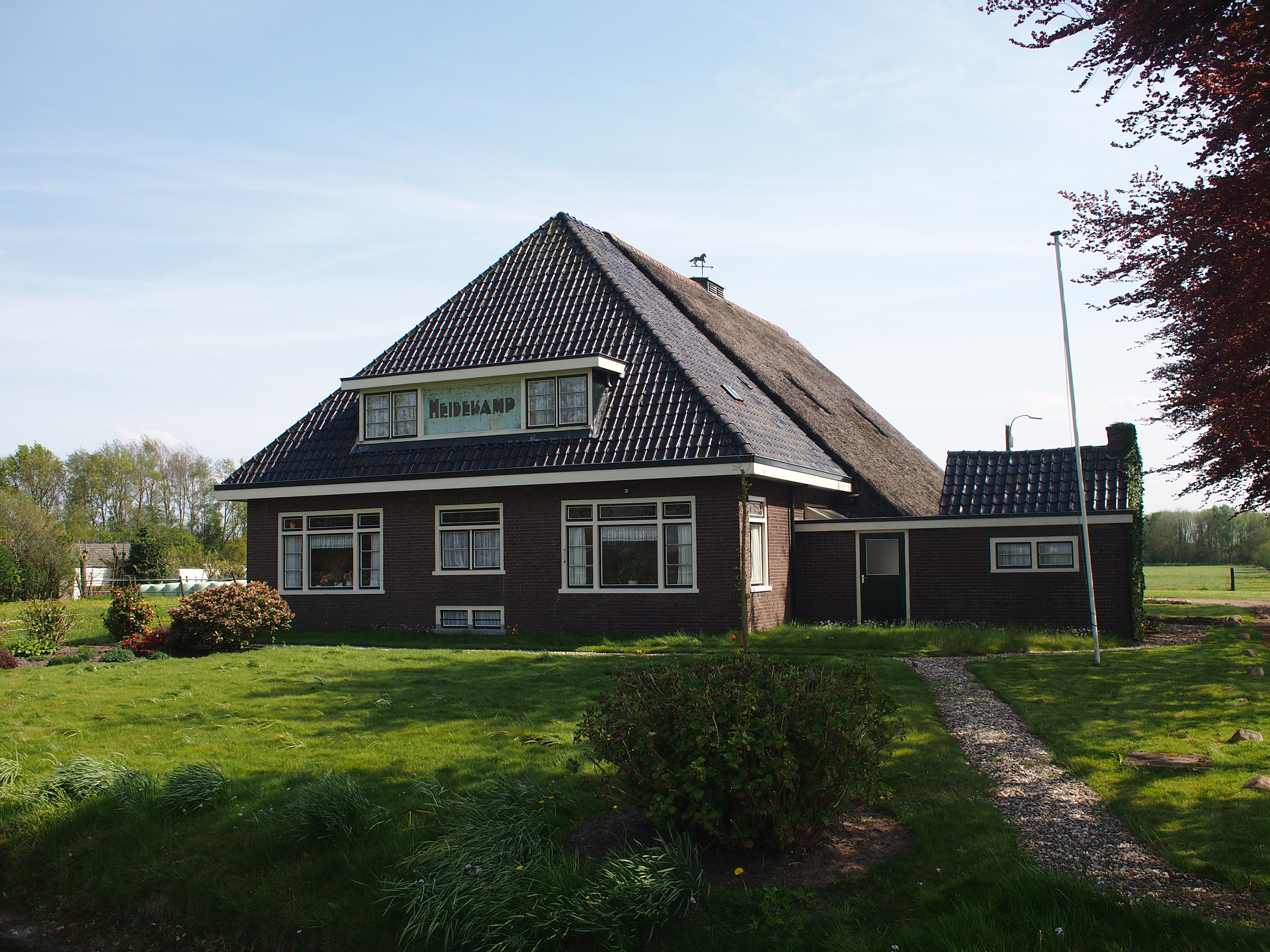
Farm in De Tike

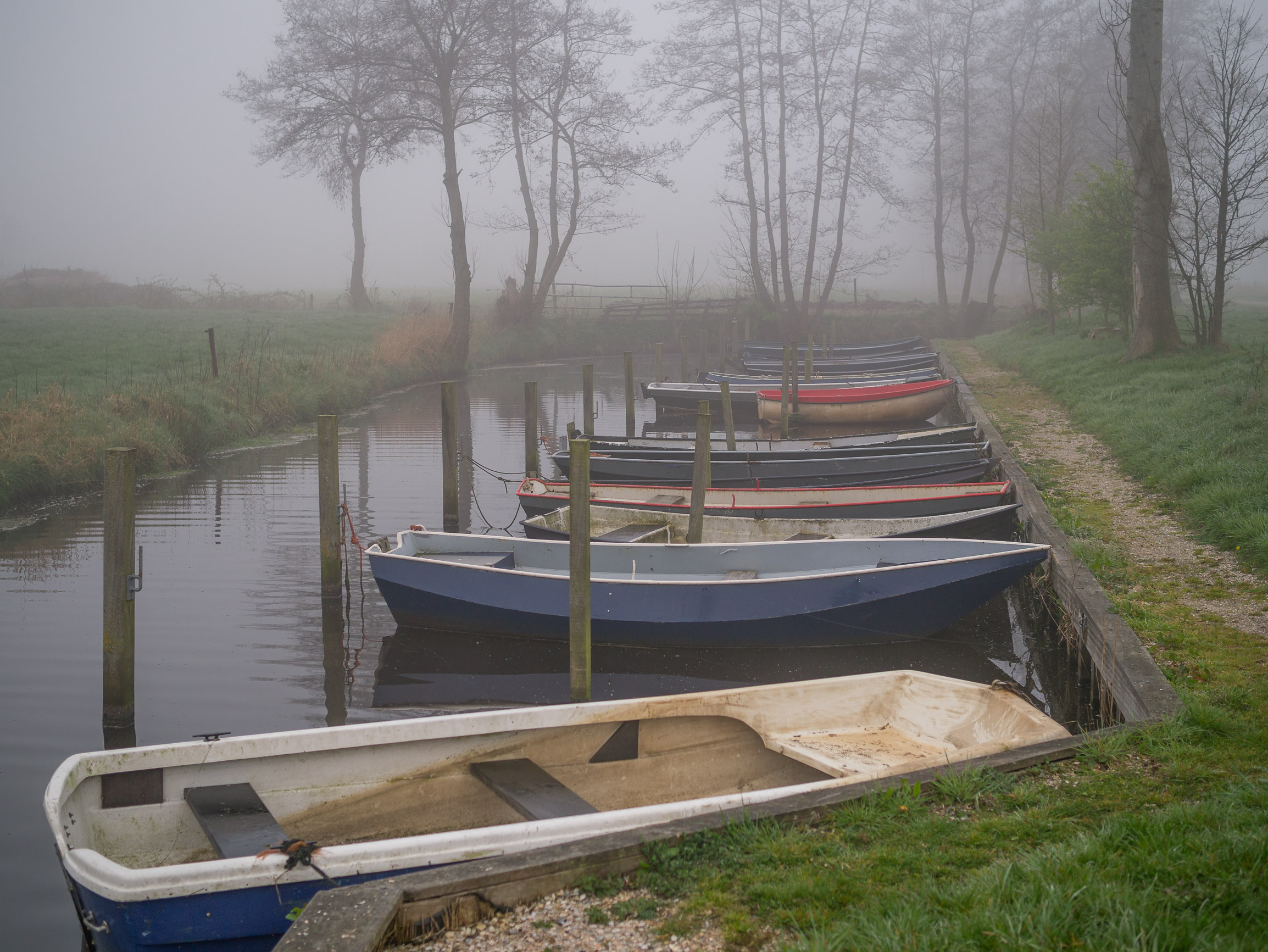
Little harbour

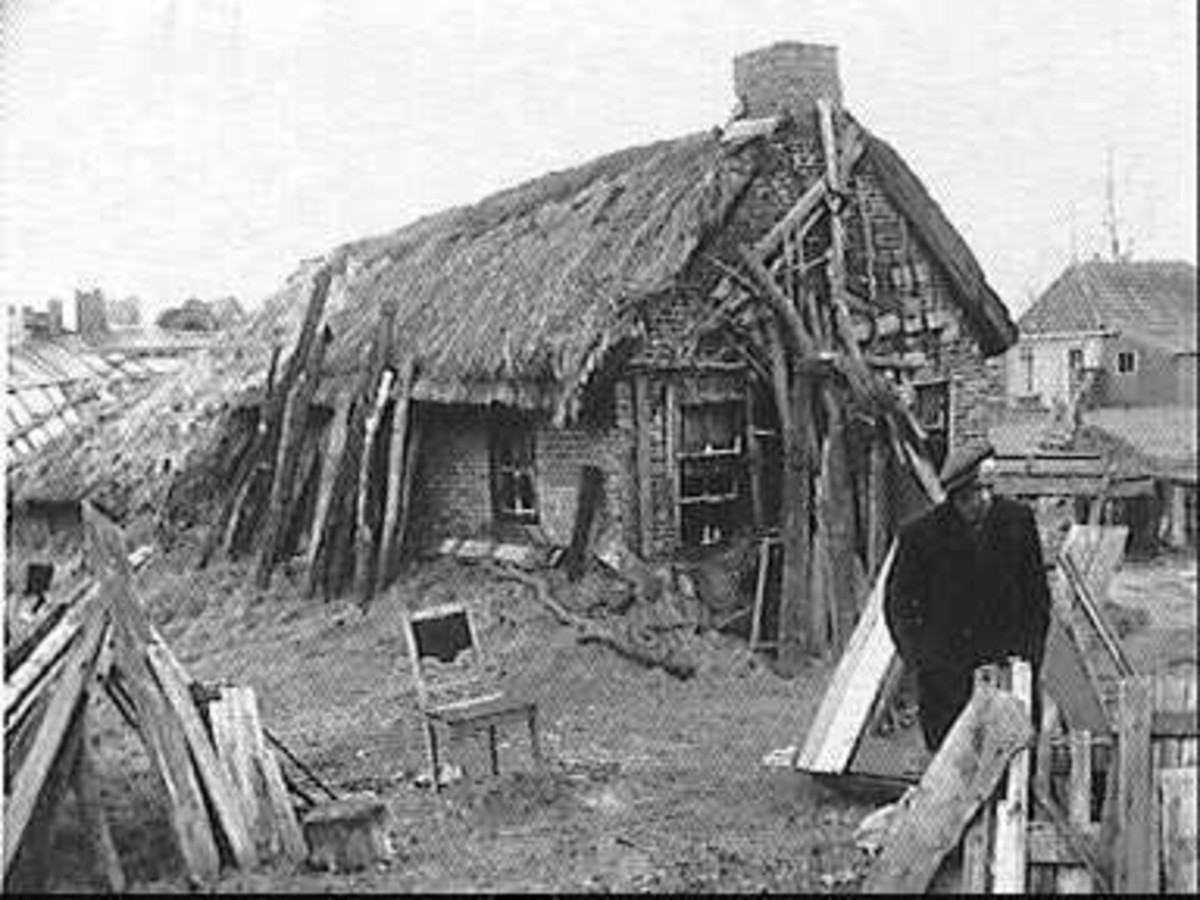
Peat excavation hut (1962)
