= De Wilgen =

De Wilgen De Wylgen (West Frisian)
- Village
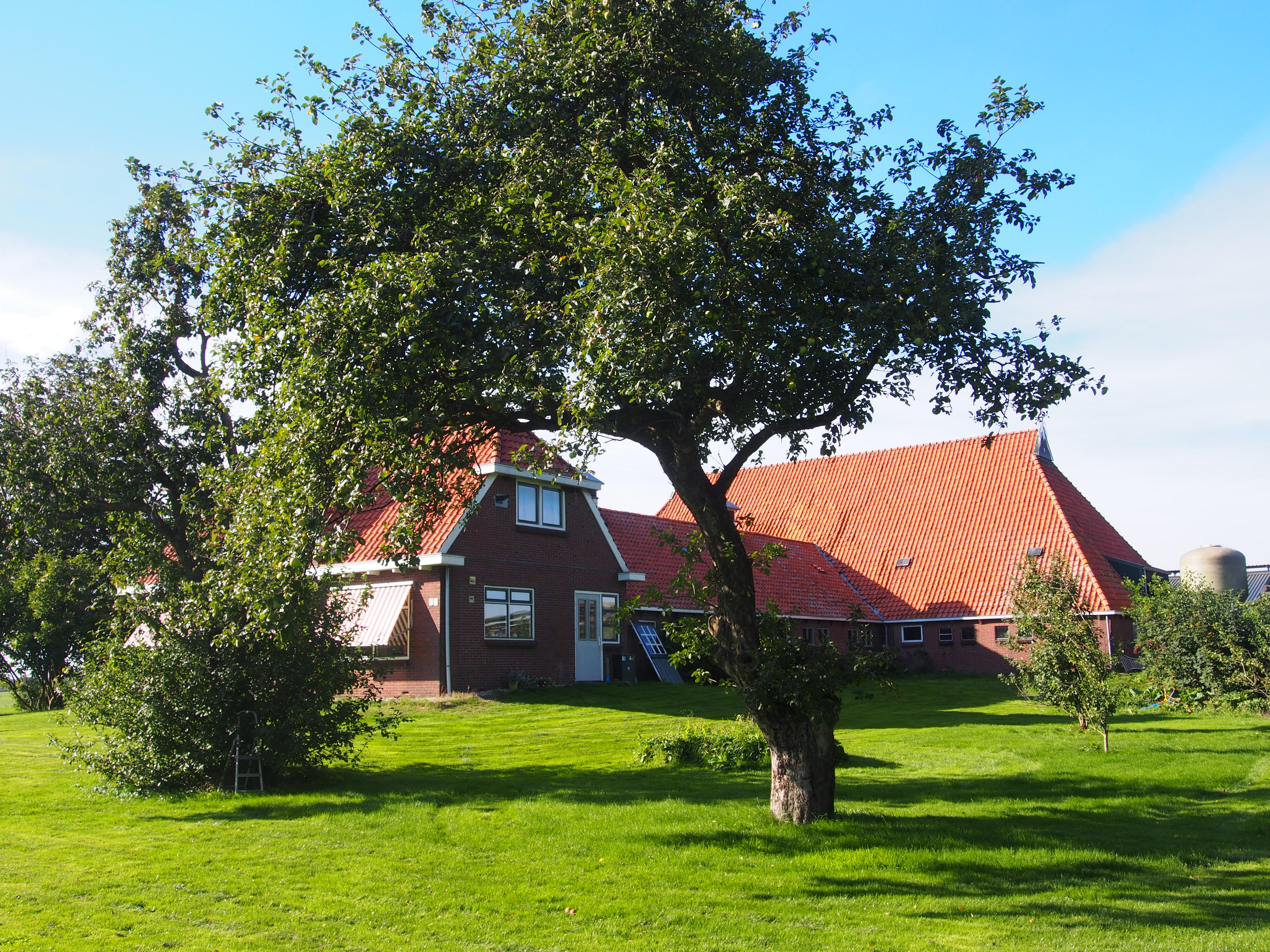

- Flag Coat of arms

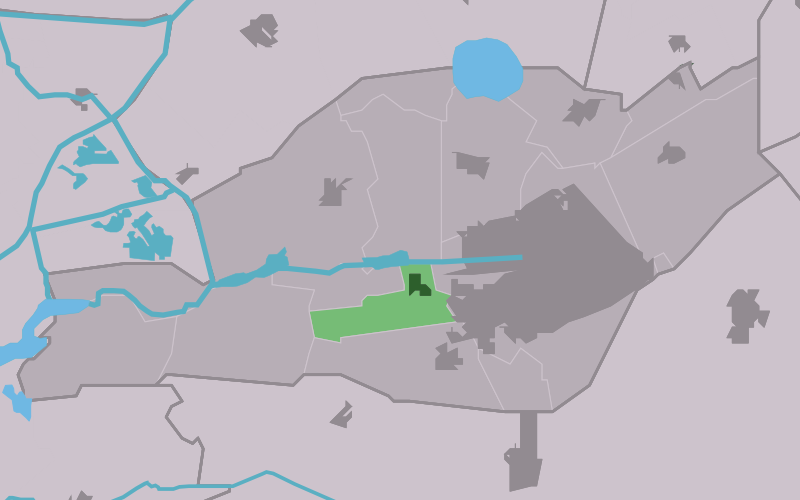
- Location in Smallingerland municipality

- Location in the Netherlands De Wilgen (Netherlands)
- Country: Netherlands
- Province: Friesland
- Municipality: Smallingerland

Area
  - Total: 4.21 km^{2} (1.63 sq mi)
- Elevation: 1.0 m (3.3 ft)

Population (2021)
  - Total: 670
  - Density: 160/km^{2} (410/sq mi)
- Time zone: UTC+1 (CET)
  - Summer (DST): UTC+2 (CEST)
- Postal code: 9213
- Dialing code: 0512

De Wilgen (Dutch: [də ˈʋɪlɣə(n)]; West Frisian: De Wylgen [də ˈʋilɣŋ̍]) is a small village in Smallingerland municipality in the province of Friesland, the Netherlands. It had a population of around 651 in January 2017.

The village was first mentioned in 1580 De Wilgen, and refers to the willow tree. In 1672, it was side of battle with the Prince-Bishop of Münster. The Dutch three soldiers who died are in an honorary grave.

De Wilgen was home to 150 people in 1840. De Wilgen never had a church, but started to grow in the 1970s as a suburb of Drachten.
