= Drachtstercompagnie =

Drachtstercompagnie Drachtster kompenije
- Village
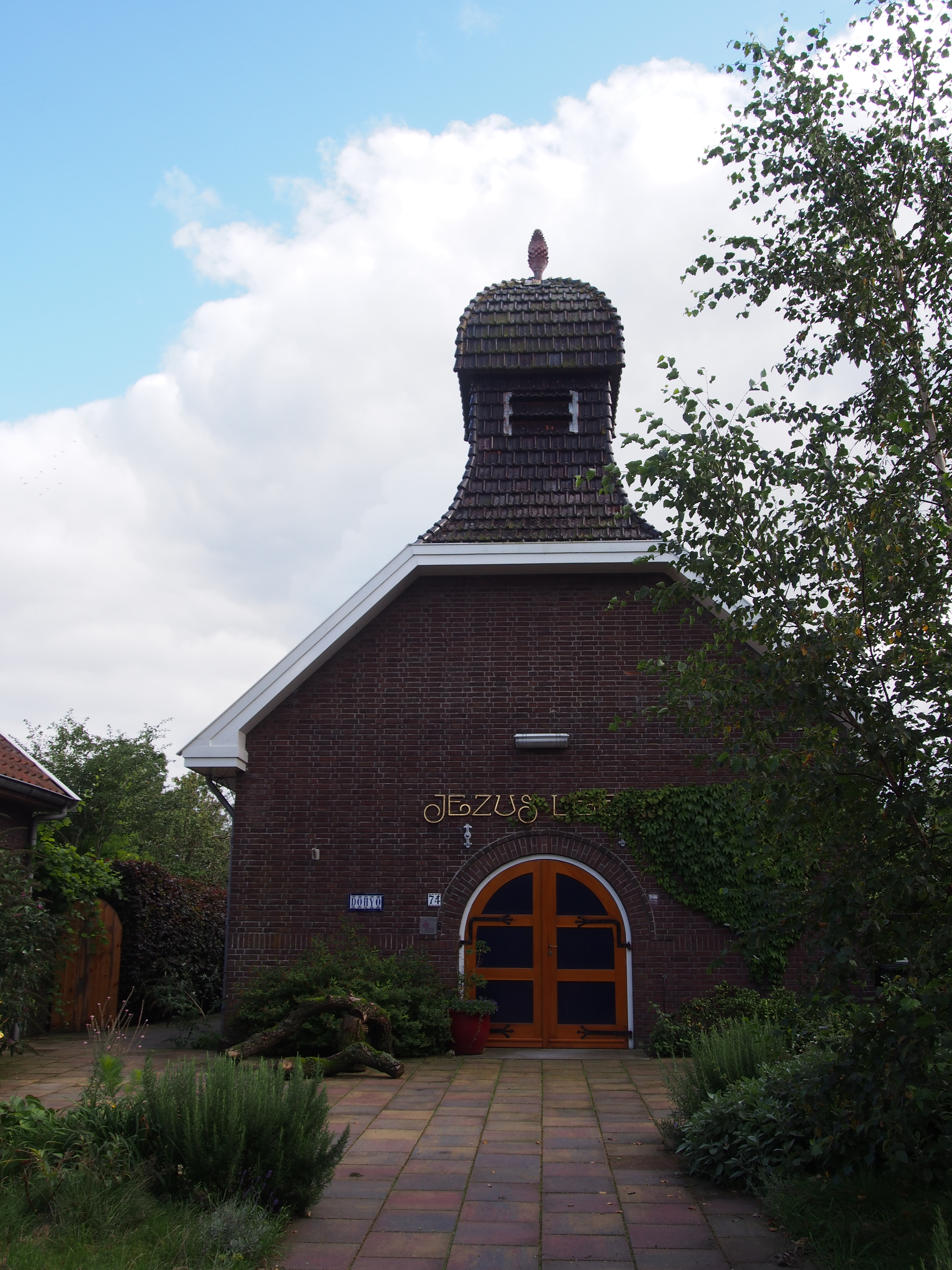
- Jesus-is-Alive church

- Flag Coat of arms

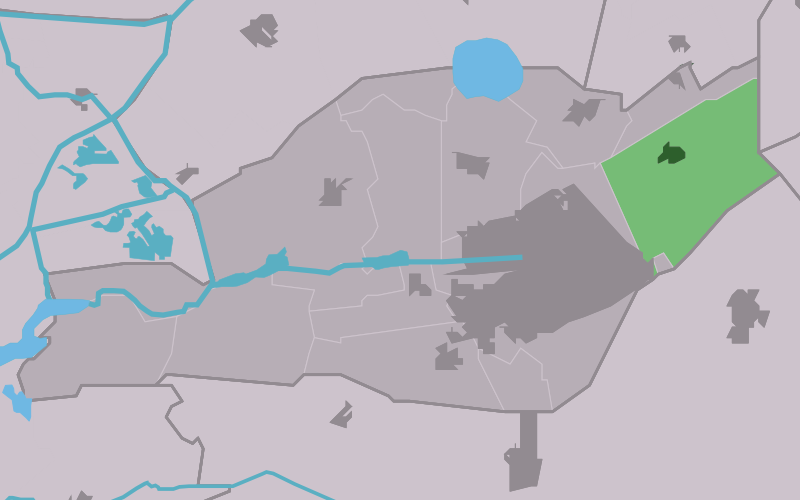
- Location in Smallingerland municipality

- Location in the Netherlands Drachtstercompagnie (Netherlands)
- Country: Netherlands
- Province: Friesland
- Municipality: Smallingerland

Area
  - Total: 13.60 km^{2} (5.25 sq mi)
- Elevation: 4 m (13 ft)

Population (2021)
  - Total: 1,660
  - Density: 122/km^{2} (316/sq mi)
- Time zone: UTC+1 (CET)
  - Summer (DST): UTC+2 (CEST)
- Postal code: 9222
- Dialing code: 0512

Drachtstercompagnie (West Frisian: Drachtster kompenije [ˈdraχtstr̩ kompəˈnɛi.ə]) is a small village in Smallingerland in the province of Friesland, the Netherlands. It had a population of around 1,185 in January 2017.

== History ==
The village was first mentioned in 1841 as Compagnie (de). It refers to the Drachtster Company who had the concession for the excavation of the peat around Drachten. A Bronze Age burial mound has been discovered, however later the raised bog made the area uninhabitable. The peat excavation started in the middle of the 18th century.

Drachtstercompagnie was home to 374 people in 1840. There was a little church in Drachtstercompagnie built in 1921. It was torn down and rebuilt in the same style in 2000, and is in use a studio. On 7 September 1941, a Vickers Wellington of the Royal Air Force was shot down and crashed in Drachtstercompagnie. The 6 crew members are buried at the local cemetery in a Commonwealth grave.

== Gallery ==
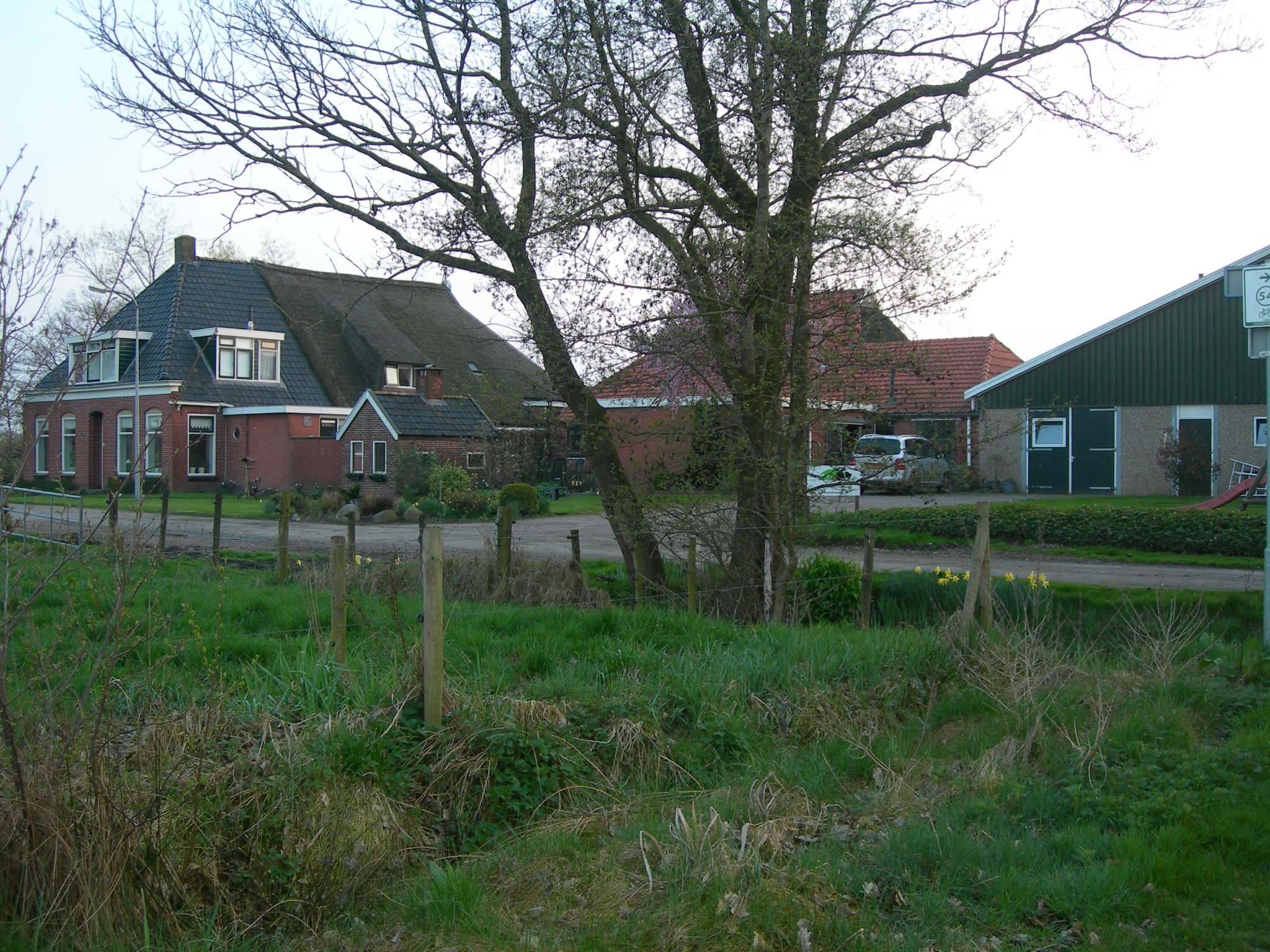
Farms in Drachtstercompagnie

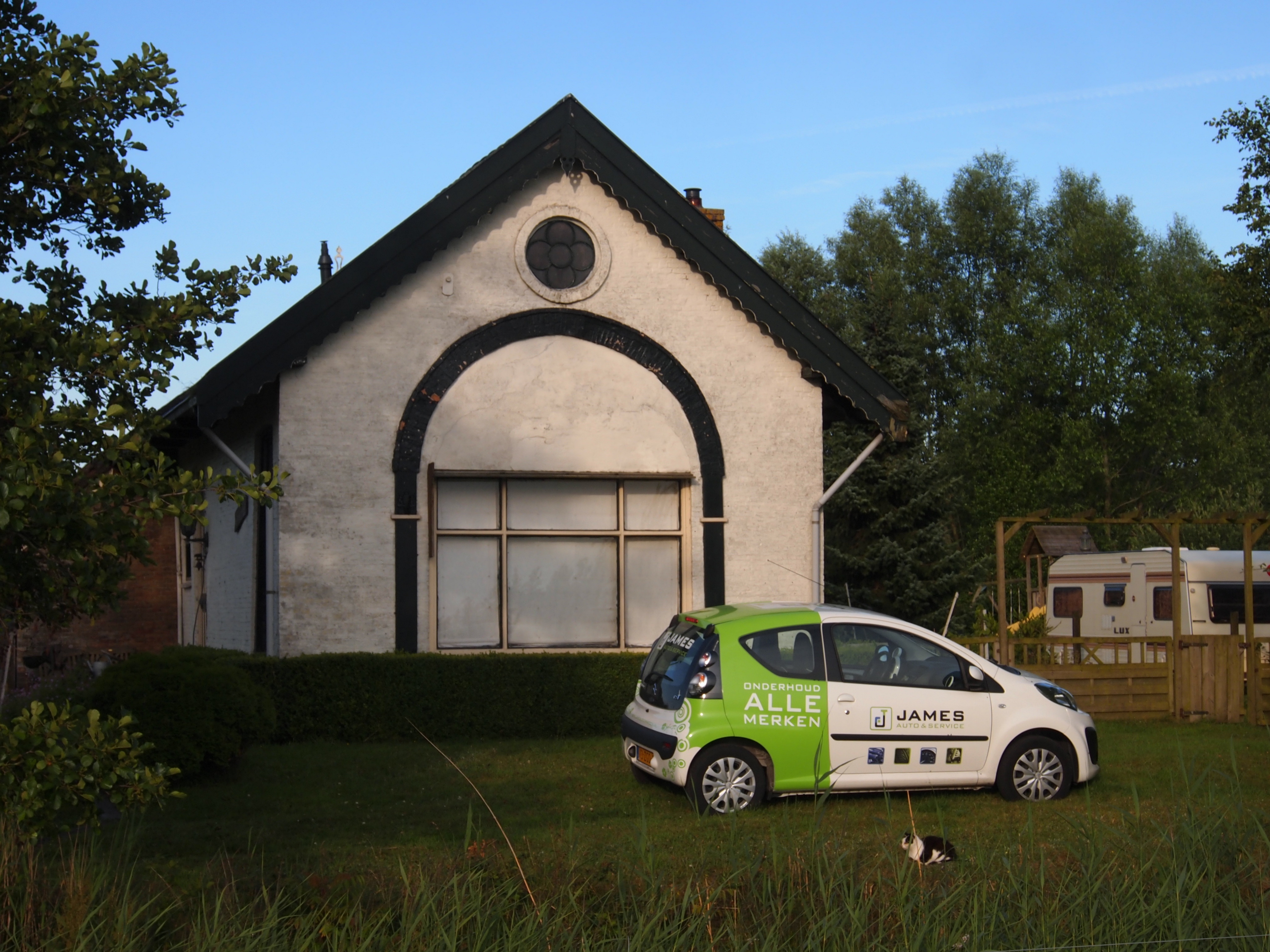
Little house in Drachtstercompagnie

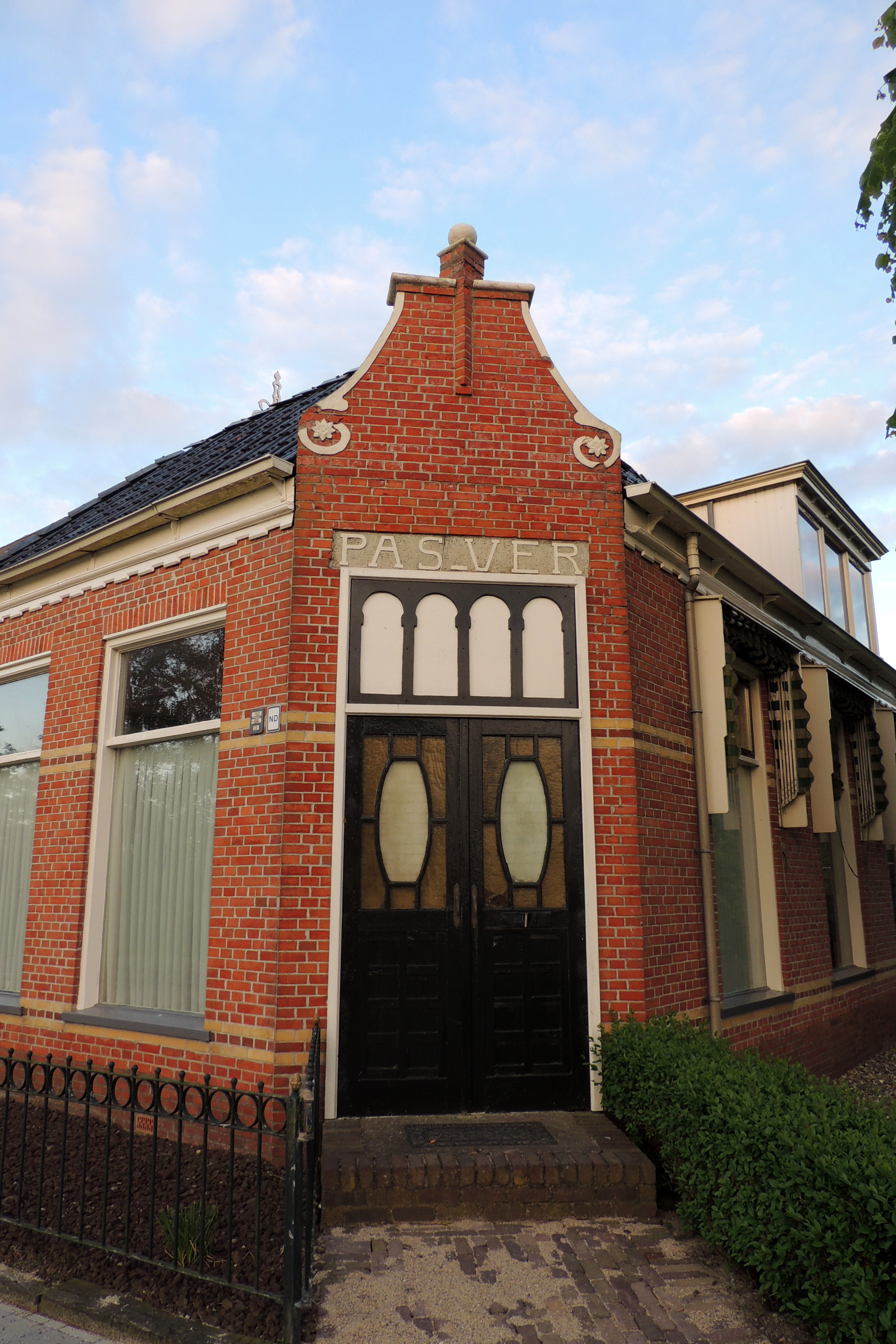
House in Drachtstercompagnie

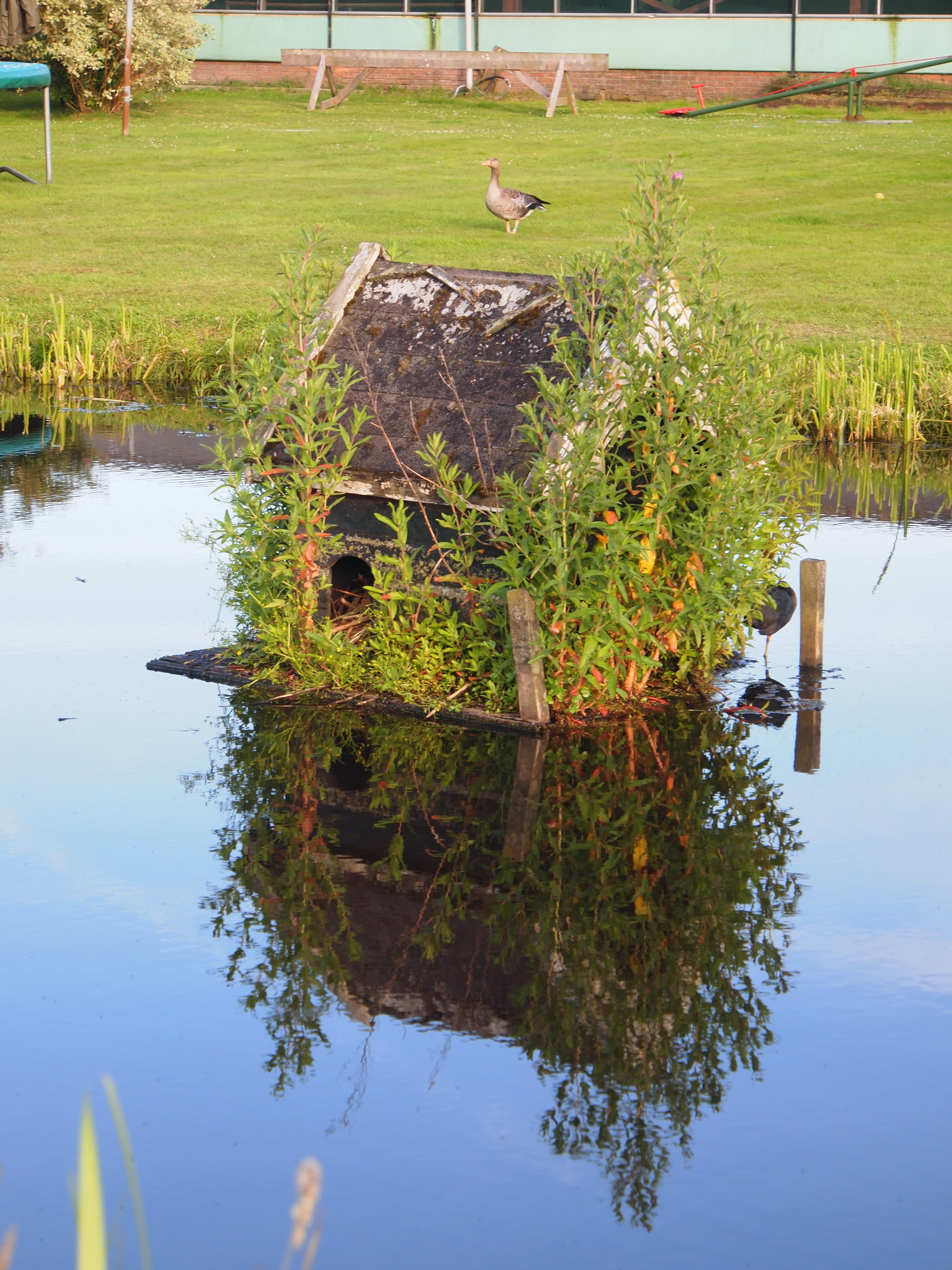
Duck house
