= Smallingerland =

Smallingerland Smellingerlân
- Municipality
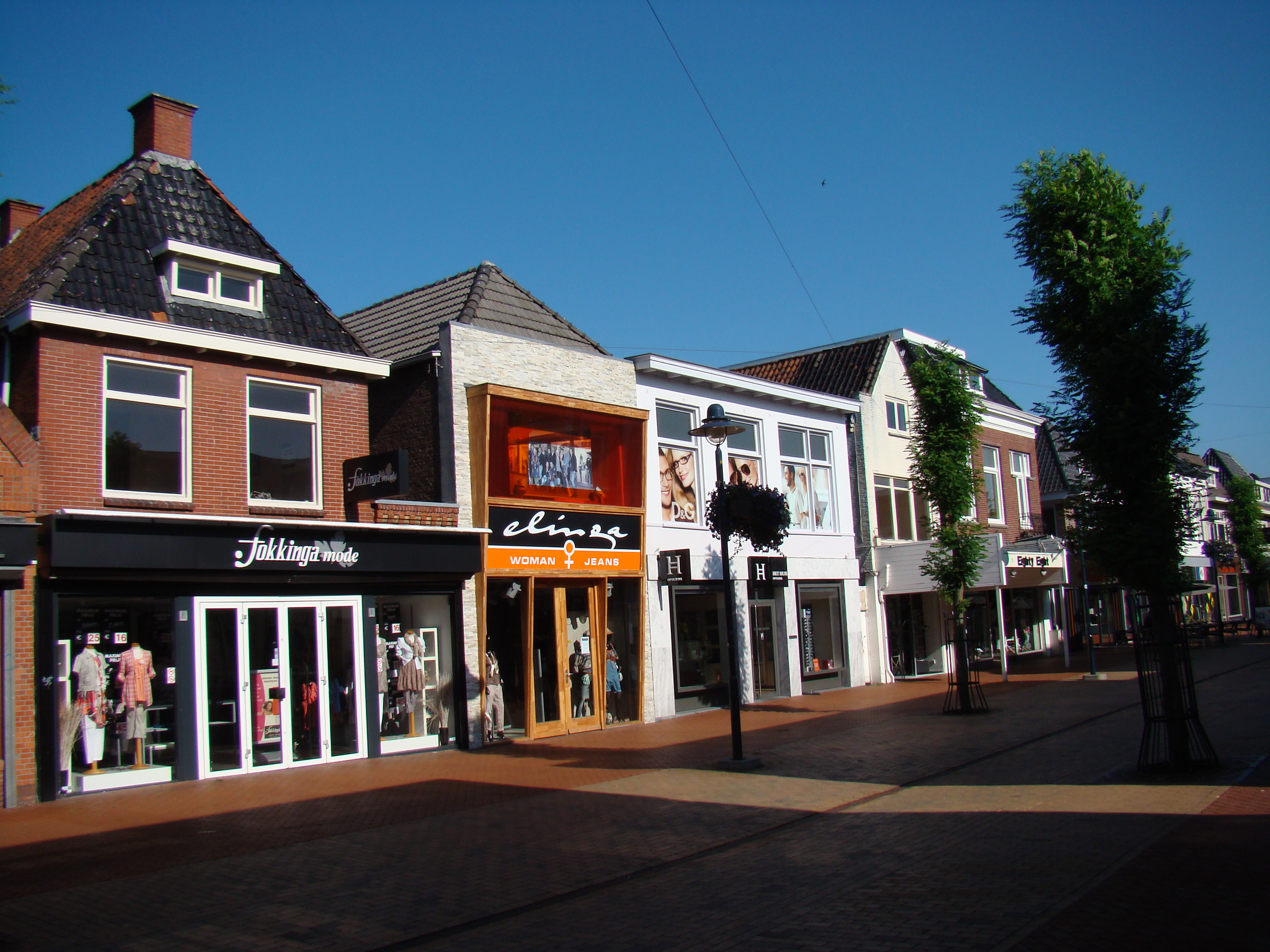
- Street in Drachten

- Flag Coat of arms

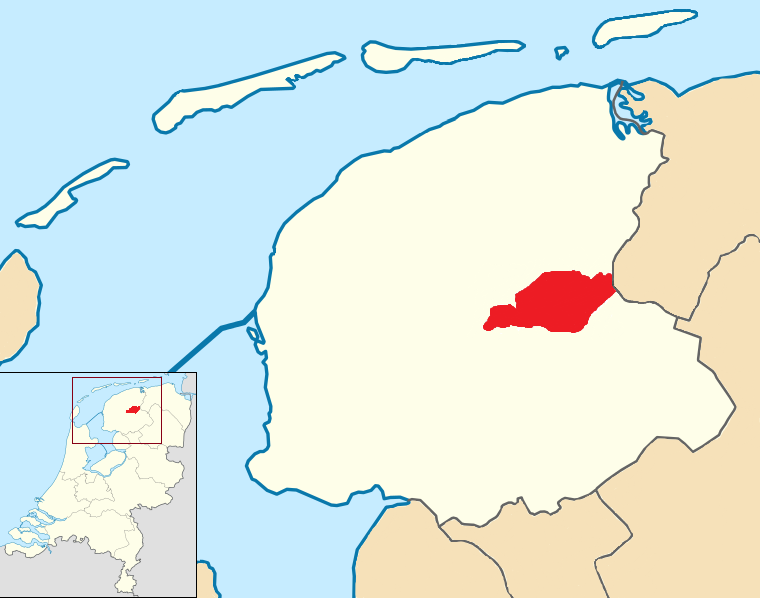
- Location in Friesland
- Coordinates: 53°6′N 6°6′E
- Country: Netherlands
- Province: Friesland

Government
  - Body: Municipal council
  - Mayor: Fred Veenstra (CDA)

Area
  - Total: 126.17 km^{2} (48.71 sq mi)
  - Land: 117.31 km^{2} (45.29 sq mi)
  - Water: 8.86 km^{2} (3.42 sq mi)
- Elevation: 1 m (3.3 ft)

Population (January 2021)
  - Total: 56,040
  - Density: 478/km^{2} (1,240/sq mi)
- Time zone: UTC+1 (CET)
  - Summer (DST): UTC+2 (CEST)
- Postcode: 8497, 9200–9223
- Area code: 0512, 0566
- Website: smallingerland.nl

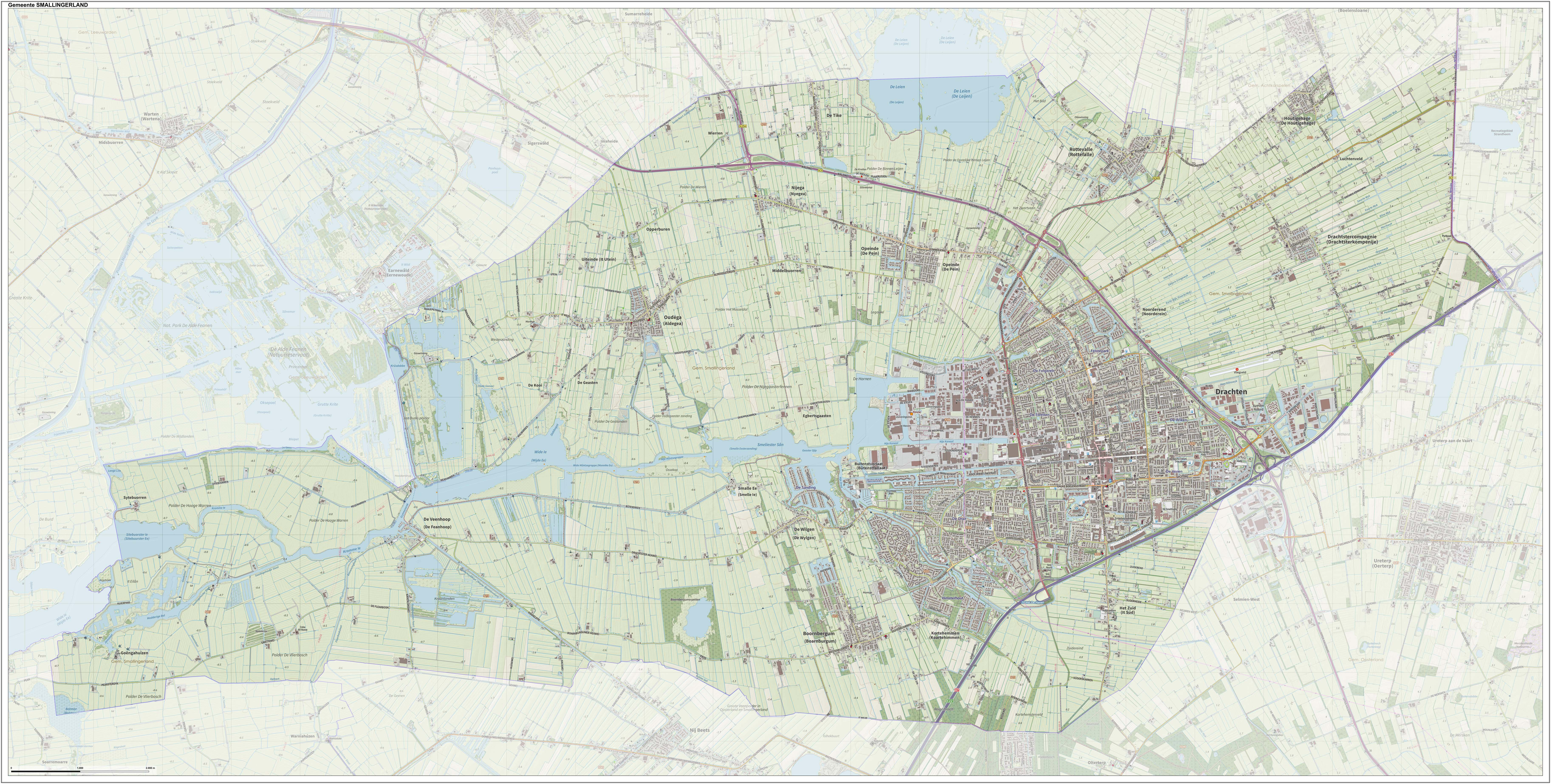
Dutch Topographic map of Smallingerland, September 2023

Smallingerland (Dutch: [ˈsmɑlɪŋərˌlɑnt]; West Frisian: Smellingerlân [ˈsmɛlɪŋəˌlɔ̃ːn]) is a municipality in the province of Friesland in the Netherlands.

== Population centres ==
Boornbergum, De Tike, De Veenhoop, De Wilgen, Drachten (main town), Drachtstercompagnie, Goëngahuizen, Houtigehage, Kortehemmen, Nijega, Opeinde, Oudega, Rottevalle and Smalle Ee.

== History ==
The name "Smallingerland" is derived from the former hamlet Smalle Ee, which used to have a major monastery. In the 14th century the annual fair of Smalle Ee became equally important as the ones of Leeuwarden and Dokkum. The name Drachten is possibly a derivative from the old Frisian word Darch, meaning "peaty soil".

The central function of Drachten in the district goes back to 1641. A Holland businessman thought it would pay to exploit the peat. 800 workers were employed to dig the Drachtstervaart canal. The peat exploitation was a disappointment, but the construction of the Drachtstervaart canal triggered other activities, such as shipbuilding. The typical peat bog landscape can still be seen, particularly near Drachtstercompagnie. Since the 1950s Drachten developed rapidly. Right now, Drachten has an important function in the region. Smallingerland has thirteen smaller villages besides Drachten, the largest being Opeinde, with 1,731 residents, the smallest being Smalle Ee, with 57 villagers.

The 1998 publication Het Gezicht van Smallingerland ("The Face of Smallingerland") gives a clear and easy to read overview of the district's history. A few passages from this publication:

"along the lush road-sides both at the north and the south side of the canal as well as along the picturesque east-branching side channel, farm houses and other buildings lie scattered on either side, including the mansion on the South Road, charmingly standing out with its own splendid and tasteful lay-out. As such Drachten, risen from the barren moors to the largest spot on the provincial maps, now shines as a magnificent jewel in Friesland's crown. Thus to sensible people Drachten displays the striking scene of shining pastures created by industrious men from desolate places."

— J. G. van Blom, Het Gezicht van Smallingerland, 1998

Notary Public J. G. van Blom wrote those words of praise about his hometown in 1840. Most of the 3,000 residents from those days would have had no chance to enjoy the umbrageous scenery; people had to make a living and after work little spare time was left. Some 200 years earlier, in 1640, the hamlets of Drachten North and Drachten South were little more than a small church and some farm houses. Other villages in the region were older, bigger and more important, for example Smalle Ee with its monastery and subsequent activities such as an annual fair, which was always bracketed together with those of Leeuwarden en Dokkum. Or Oudega, where a stone church had been erected even before 1100. Peat exploitation brought a turnaround. Peat had become an important source of energy, not only for private households but also for the industry. The need in the rapidly growing province of Holland during the 17th century was higher than Friesland could supply. Most of the transport was over water, therefore often by track boat. Peat exploitation meant a welcome activity for many villages, although most of the income did not flow into the pockets of the struggling peat cutters.

In 1641 farmers in Drachten North and Drachten South entered into an agreement with financers from the province of Holland, the Drachten Associates. One of these moneylenders was businessman Passchier Hendriks Bolleman from The Hague. The agreement stipulated that the peat in Smallingerland was designated for the Holland industry. For transport by boat the Drachtster Compagnonsvaart canal and two side channels had to be constructed. During one year 800 workers had been digging every day. And where people spent their days, other developments followed, such as dwellings, places for storage, hostels, and businesses. Although the economic success of cutting peat was short-lived (it even led to Passchier Bolleman's financial ruin), it led to the foundation of Drachten. The Drachtstervaart brought in ships and the ships brought in not only return freight, but also their own service industry: rope-yards, carpenter's yards, and forges. In 1746 the first real shipyard was established on the Langewijk, initially only for the construction of timber flatboats, but after 1895 also for iron hull ships. In 1902 a second shipyard followed on the Drachtstervaart. Even today, skûtsjes from these shipyards take part in the major Frisian sailing event, the skûtsjesilen.

In the 17th century, the governor of Smallingerland—the predecessor of today's mayor—was located in Oudega, which had taken over the annual fairs from Smalle Ee. After completion of the Drachtstervaart, the economic activities, and therefore also the annual fairs, had moved to Drachten; it would only be a matter of time for the District Council to follow. This was the basis for the current structure of Smallingerland: Drachten with more than 44,000 residents and the thirteen surrounding villages totalling more than 10,000 residents. Along the "lush road-sides" from the notary public Van Blom-era residential areas have mushroomed and businesses, big and small, opened their doors. As far as employment opportunities are concerned, Smallingerland is the fourth-best district in the north of the Netherlands and ranks number two within the province of Friesland. Shopping centre, nightlife, education, and health care are focused on a catchment area of more than 150,000 people.

== Notable people ==
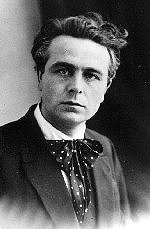
Fedde Schurer, 1930's

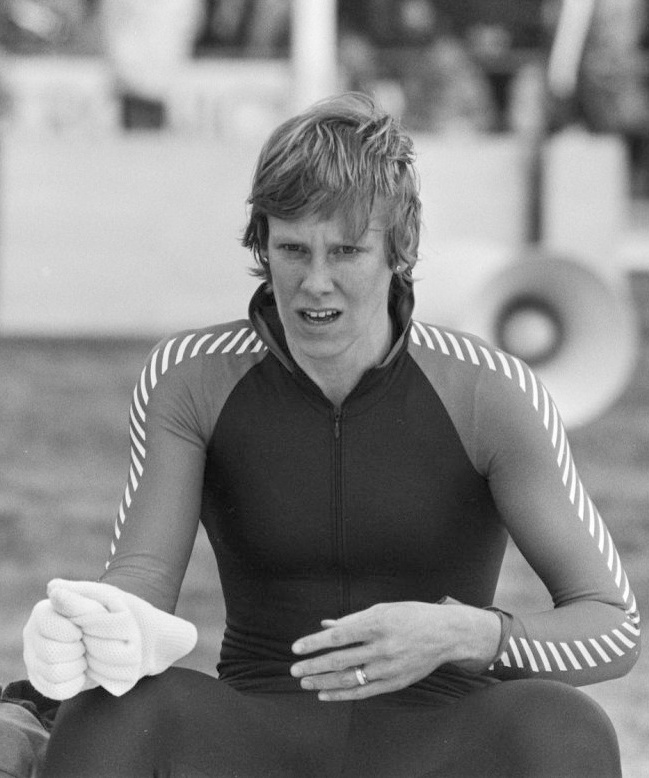
Alie Boorsma, 1982

- Professor Pieter Klazes Pel (1852 in Smallingerland – 1919) a Dutch physician and professor of internal medicine
- Pier Pander (1864 in Drachten – 1919) a Dutch sculptor and designer of medals
- Herman Theodoor Colenbrander (1871 in Drachten – 1945) a Dutch historian and academic
- S.H. de Roos (1877 in Drachten - 1962) a Dutch type designer, book cover designer and artist.
- Fedde Schurer (1898 in Drachten – 1968) a Dutch schoolteacher, journalist, language activist and politician
- Hendrik Kloosterman (1900 in Rottevalle – 1968) a Dutch mathematician, worked on number theory
- Cisca Wijmenga (born 1964 in Drachten) a Dutch professor of Human Genetics
- Zanger Rinus (born 1969 in Drachten) a Dutch singer
- Erik Bosgraaf (born 1980 in Drachten) a Dutch recorder player and musicologist
- Tim Douwsma (born 1987 in Drachten) a Dutch singer
- Iris Kroes (born 1992 in Drachten) a Dutch singer-songwriter and harpist
- Maurice de Jong (born 1973) a Dutch composer and musician

=== Sport ===
- Jan Lammers (1926 in Drachten – 2011) a Dutch sprinter, competed at the 1948 Summer Olympics
- Jeen van den Berg (1928 in De Veenhoop – 2014) a Dutch long track speed skater, competed at the 1956 and 1960 Winter Olympics
- Alie Boorsma (born 1959 in Drachten) a retired speed skater, competed at the 1984 Winter Olympics

== Twin towns – sister cities ==
Smallingerland is twinned with:

- Gobabis, Namibia

Smallingerland also used to be twinned with Kiryat Ono, Israel.
