= Smalle Ee =

Smalle Ee Smelle Ie
- Village
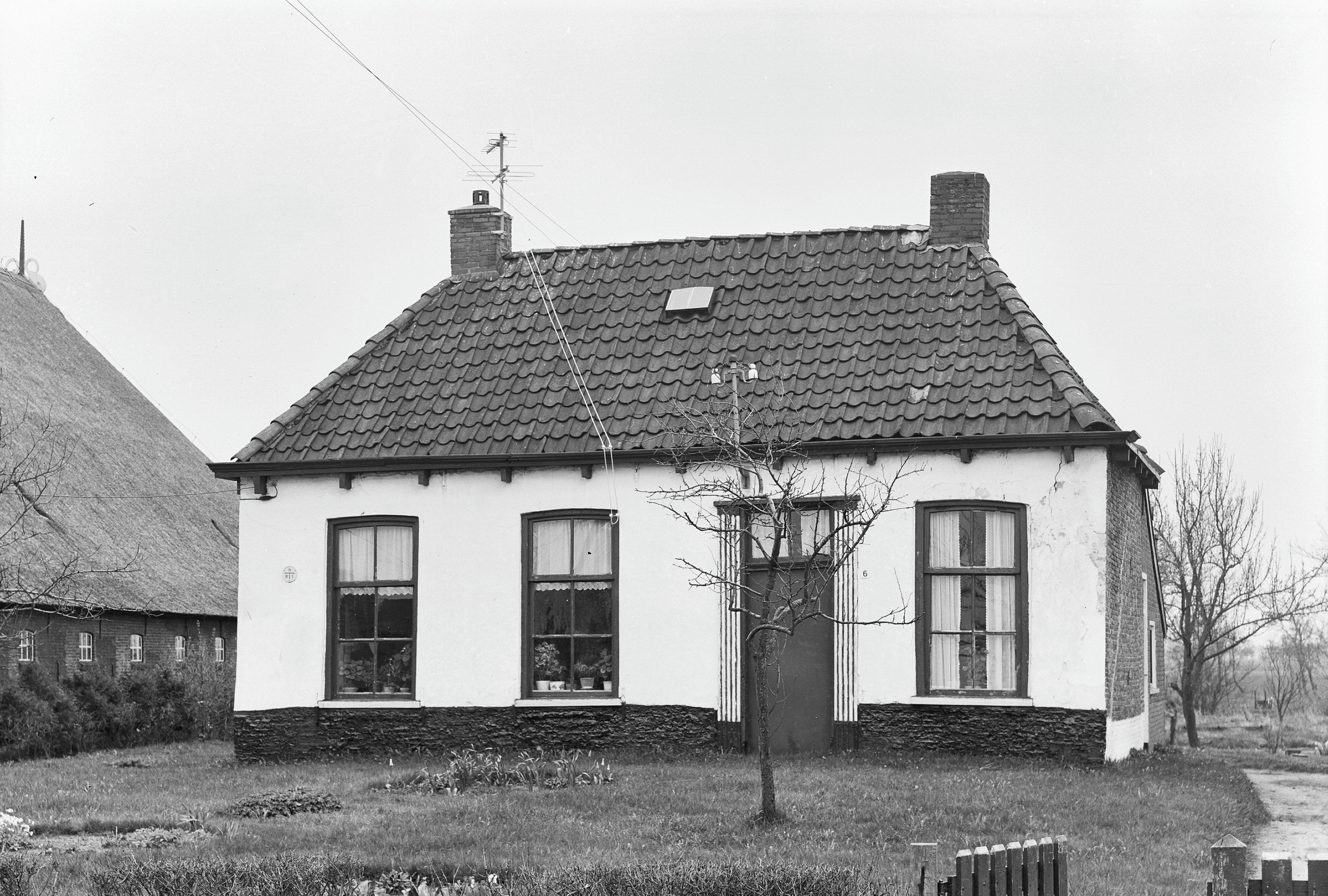
- Farm in Smalle Ee (1966)

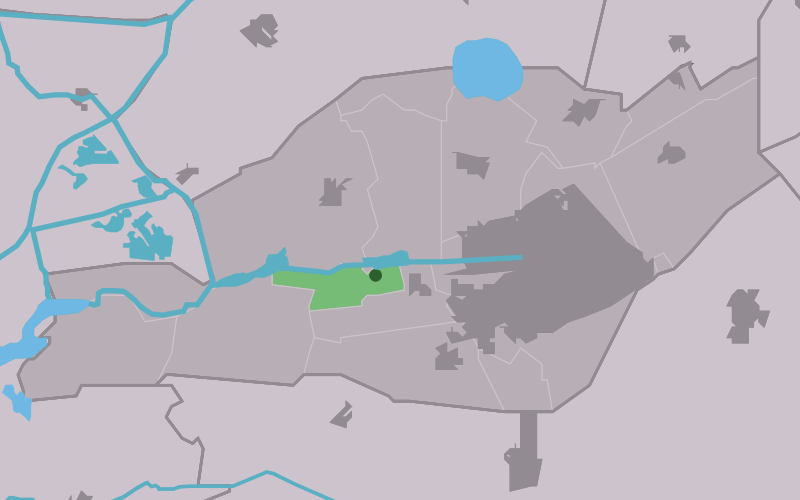
- Location in Smallingerland municipality

- Location in the Netherlands Smalle Ee (Netherlands)
- Country: Netherlands
- Province: Friesland
- Municipality: Smallingerland

Area
  - Total: 3.03 km^{2} (1.17 sq mi)
- Elevation: 1.1 m (3.6 ft)

Population (2021)
  - Total: 45
  - Density: 15/km^{2} (38/sq mi)
- Time zone: UTC+1 (CET)
  - Summer (DST): UTC+2 (CEST)
- Postal code: 9214
- Dialing code: 0512

Smalle Ee (Dutch pronunciation: [ˌsmɑlə ˈʔeː]; West Frisian: Smelle Ie [ˌsmɛlə ˈiə]) is the smallest village in Smallingerland municipality in the province of Friesland, the Netherlands. It had a population of around 43 in January 2017.

== History ==
The village was first mentioned in 1230 as Smalena, and means "narrow river". The double monastery Onser Lyewe Vrouwen Smelgeraconvent was located near the village. After around 1400, it became a Benedictine nun monastery, and closed in 1580.

Around 1600, it was the capital of the grietenij (predecessor of the municipalities) Smallingerland (literally: land belonging to Smalle (Ee)". The current municipality is still named after Smalle Ee. The capital was later moved Oudega and later Drachten. No church was ever built in Smalle Ee.

Smalle Ee was home to 89 people in 1840. Even though it is technically a hamlet, it was elevated to a village in 1955.
