= Kortehemmen =

Kortehemmen Koartehimmen
- Village
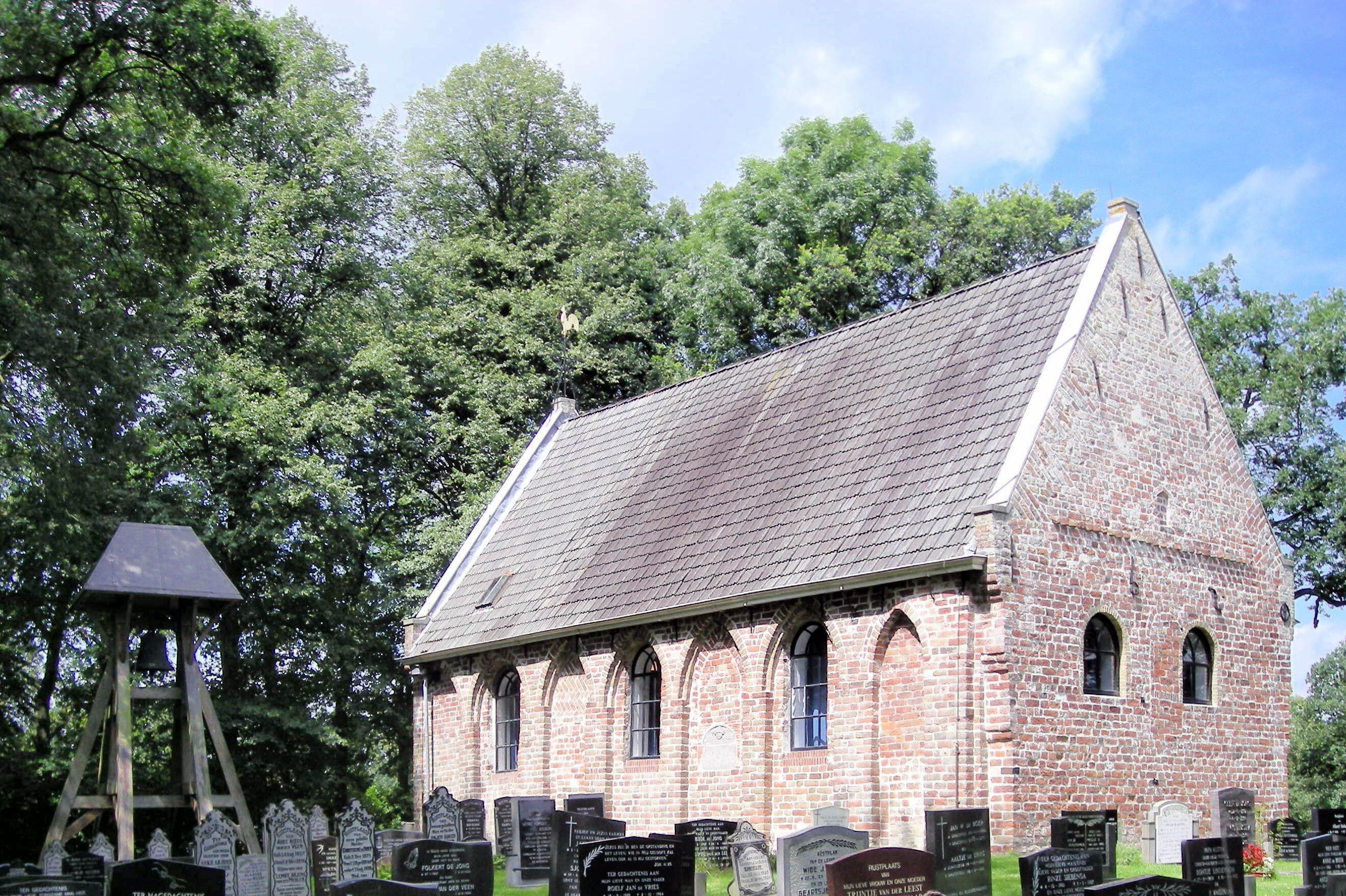
- Kortehemmen church and bellfray

- Coat of arms

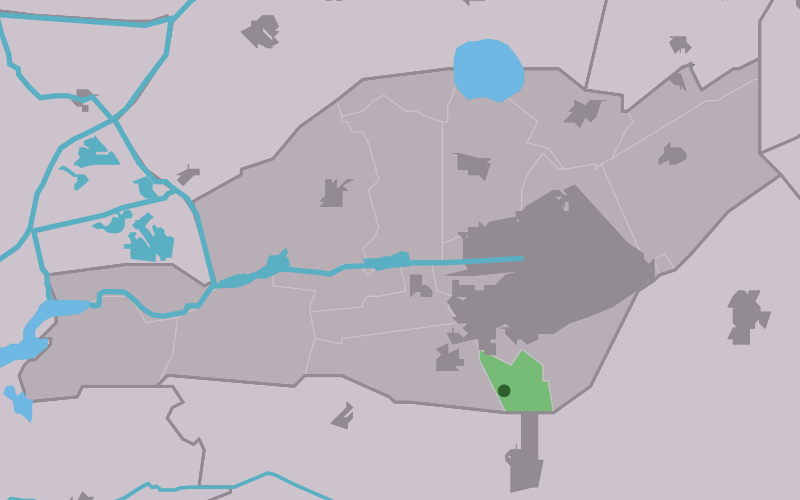
- Location in Smallingerland municipality

- Location in the Netherlands Kortehemmen (Netherlands)
- Country: Netherlands
- Province: Friesland
- Municipality: Smallingerland

Area
  - Total: 2.34 km^{2} (0.90 sq mi)
- Elevation: 1.6 m (5.2 ft)

Population (2021)
  - Total: 170
  - Density: 73/km^{2} (190/sq mi)
- Time zone: UTC+1 (CET)
  - Summer (DST): UTC+2 (CEST)
- Postal code: 9211
- Dialing code: 0512

Kortehemmen (West Frisian: Koartehimmen) is a village in Smallingerland municipality in the province of Friesland, the Netherlands. It had a population of around 258 in January 2017.

== History ==
The village was first mentioned in 1444 as Korteham, and means "short silted land near a stream". Korteham developed on a sandy ridge along the river Drait with Kortehemmen on one side and Zuider Drachten (nowadays part of Drachten) on the other. Around 1300, a church was built in the village. No tower was built and a belfry was added instead. The current belfry dates from 1950.

Kortehemmen was home to 127 people in 1840. In 1939, a conference centre was opened in the village by the Woodbrookers. Kortehemmen was physically cut off from Drachten by the construction of the A7 motorway.

== Gallery ==
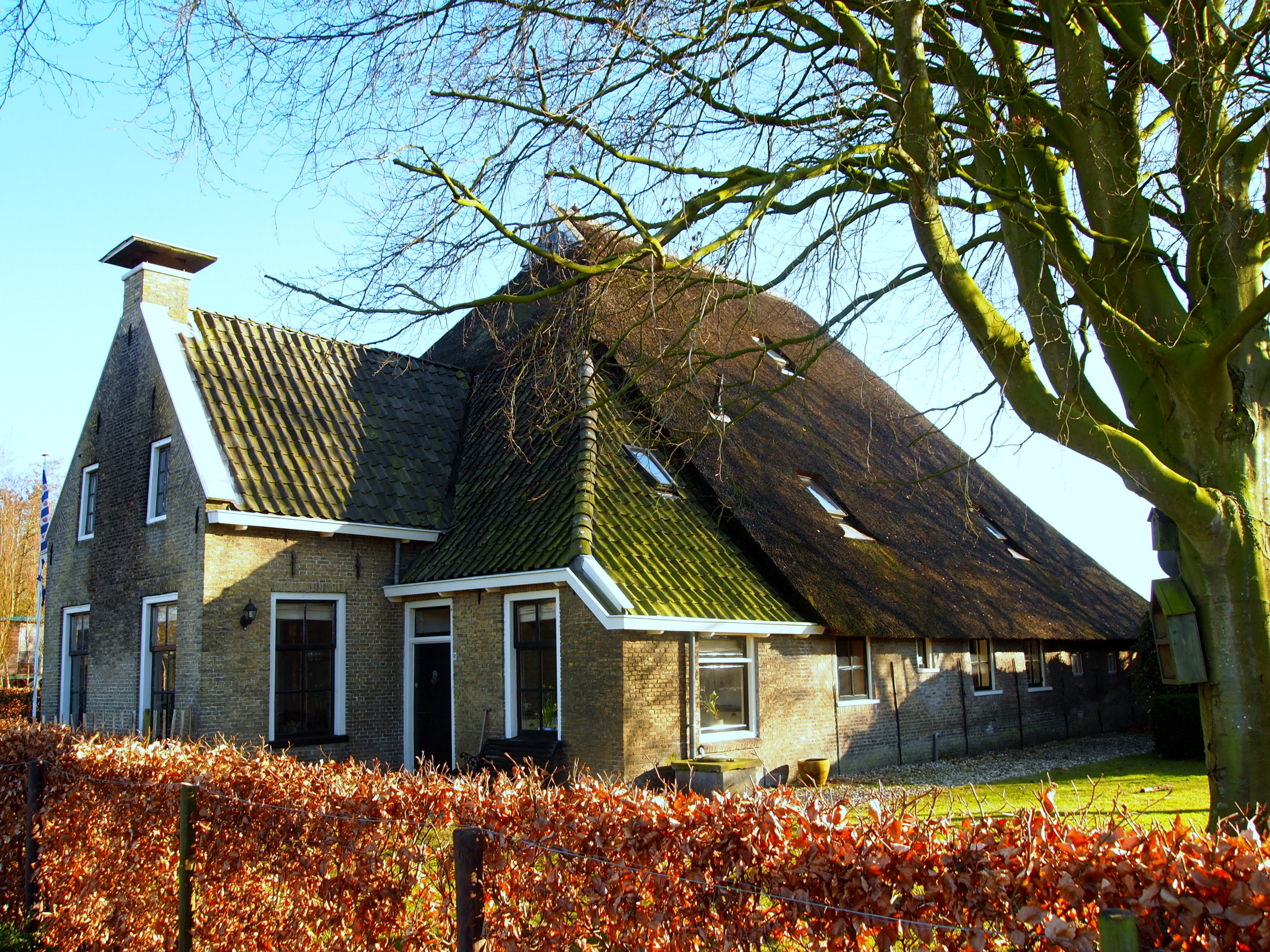
Farm in Kortehemmen

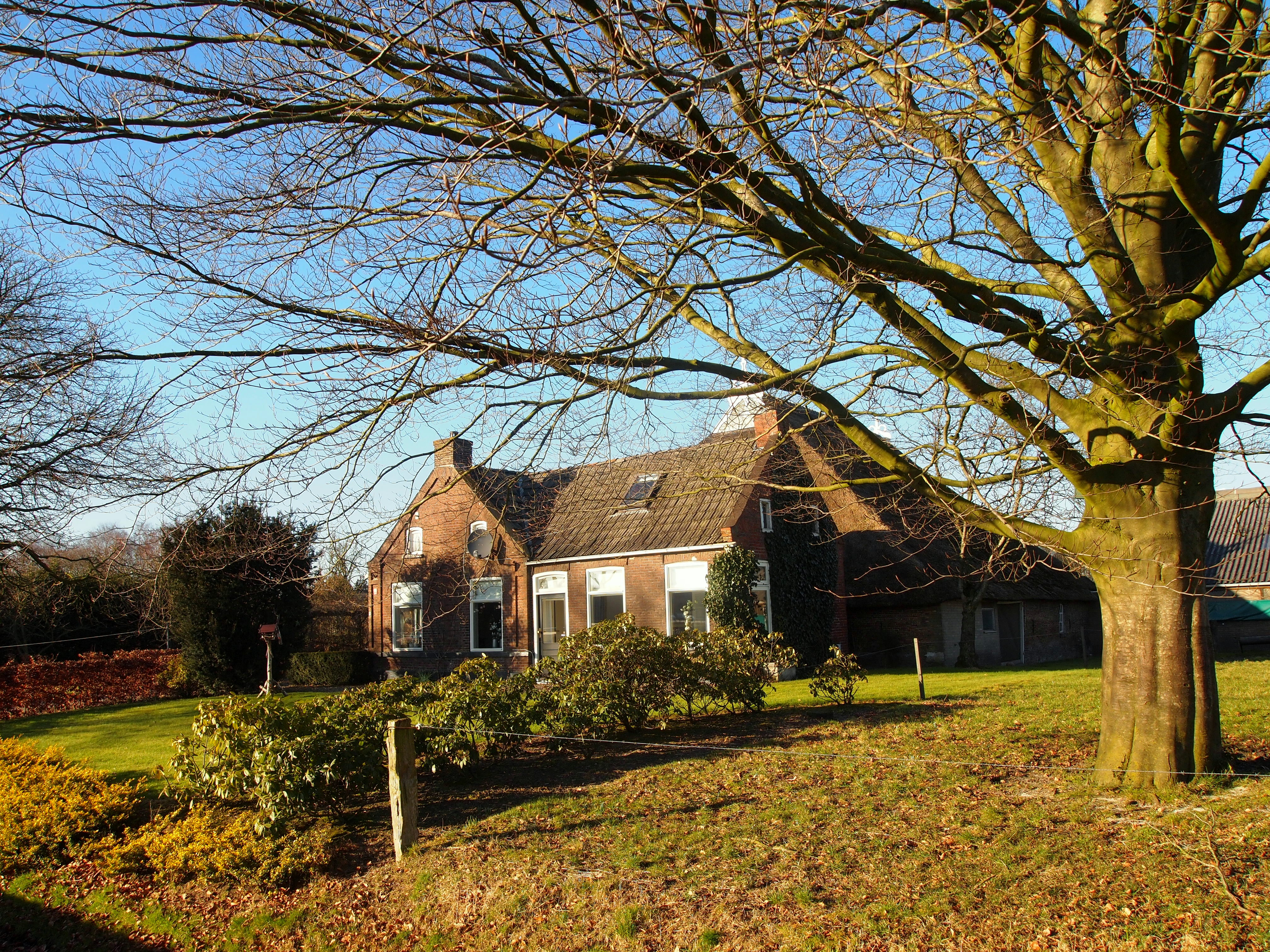
Farm in Kortehemmen
