= De Veenhoop =

De Veenhoop De Feanhoop
- Village
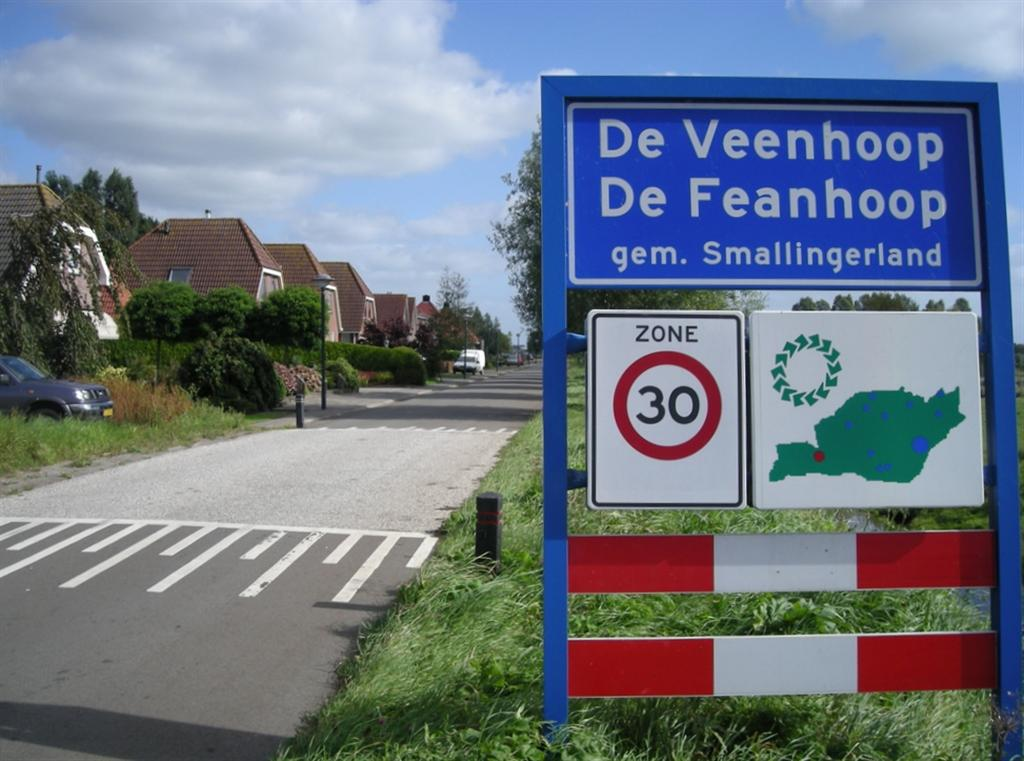

- Flag Coat of arms

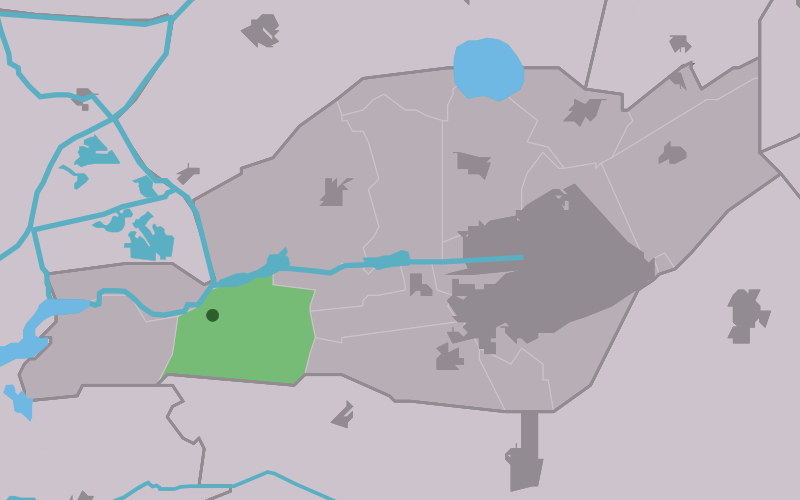
- Location in Smallingerland municipality

- Location in the Netherlands De Veenhoop (Netherlands)
- Country: Netherlands
- Province: Friesland
- Municipality: Smallingerland

Area
  - Total: 9.75 km^{2} (3.76 sq mi)
- Elevation: −1.0 m (−3.3 ft)

Population (2021)
  - Total: 260
  - Density: 27/km^{2} (69/sq mi)
- Time zone: UTC+1 (CET)
  - Summer (DST): UTC+2 (CEST)
- Postal code: 9215
- Dialing code: 0512

De Veenhoop (West Frisian: De Feanhoop) is a village in Smallingerland municipality in the province of Friesland, the Netherlands. It had a population of around 245 in January 2017.

== History ==
The village was first mentioned between 1851 and 1855 as De Veenhoop, and means "place where peat is excavated". De Veenhoop developed in the late 19th century at the intersection of the Polderhoofdkanaal and the Grietmansrak as a peat excavation village.

== Nature ==
The Petgatten de Feanhoop is a nature area on the edge of De Alde Feanen National Park. The 200 hectares (490 acres) area of lakes and swamp forest attracted a large variety of bird life, and is a protected area since 1996.

== Gallery ==
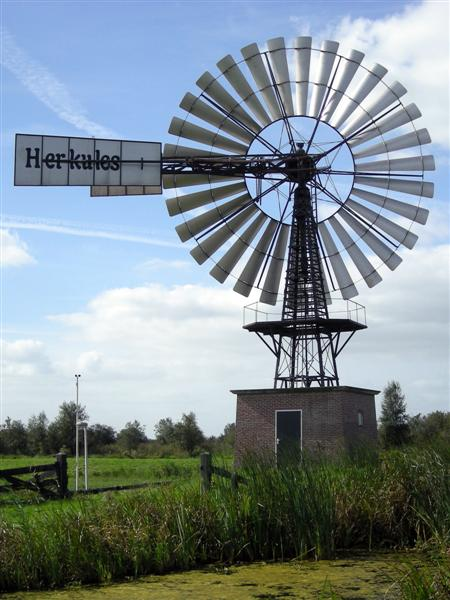
Windmotor Herkules

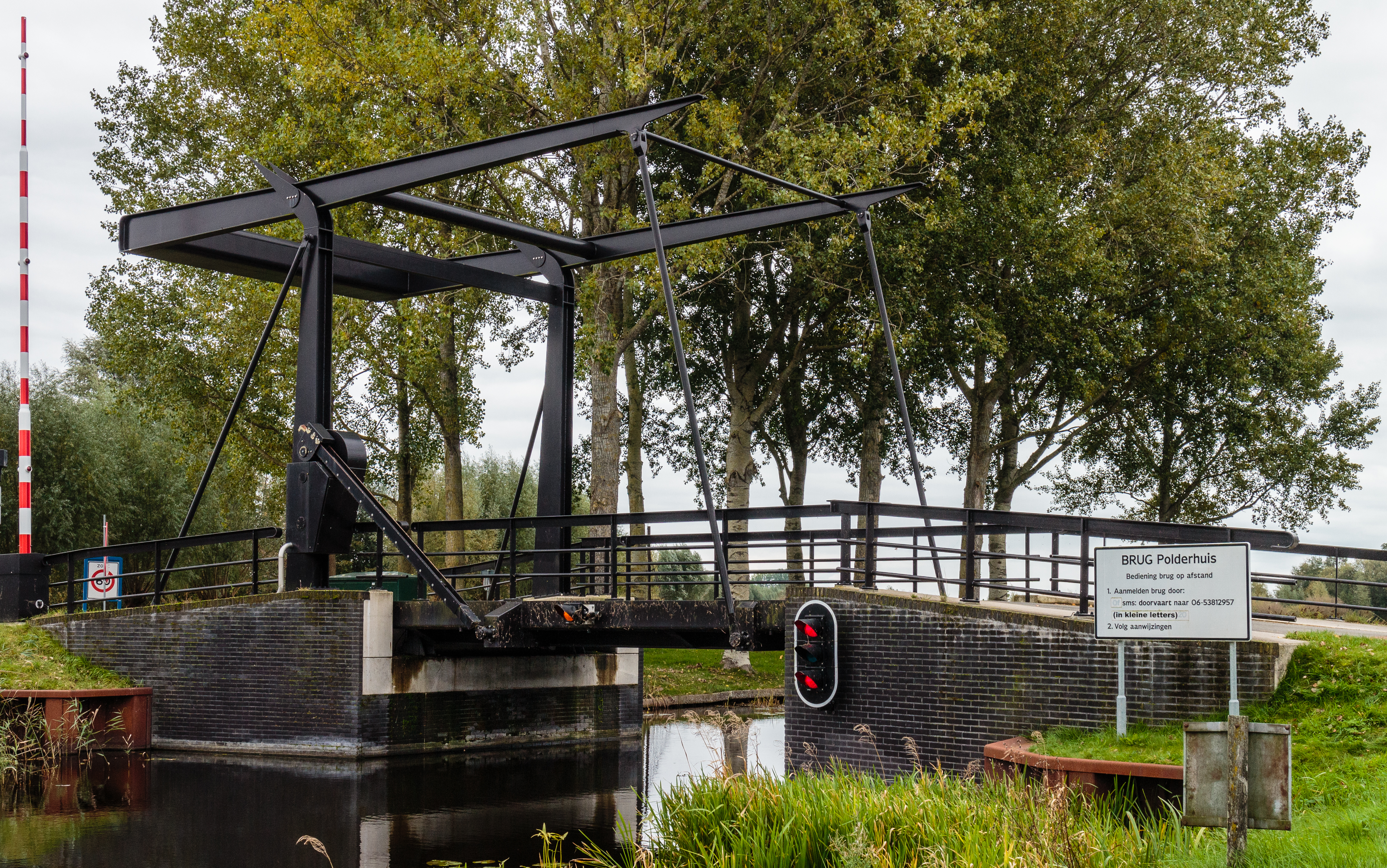
Draw bridge Polderhuis

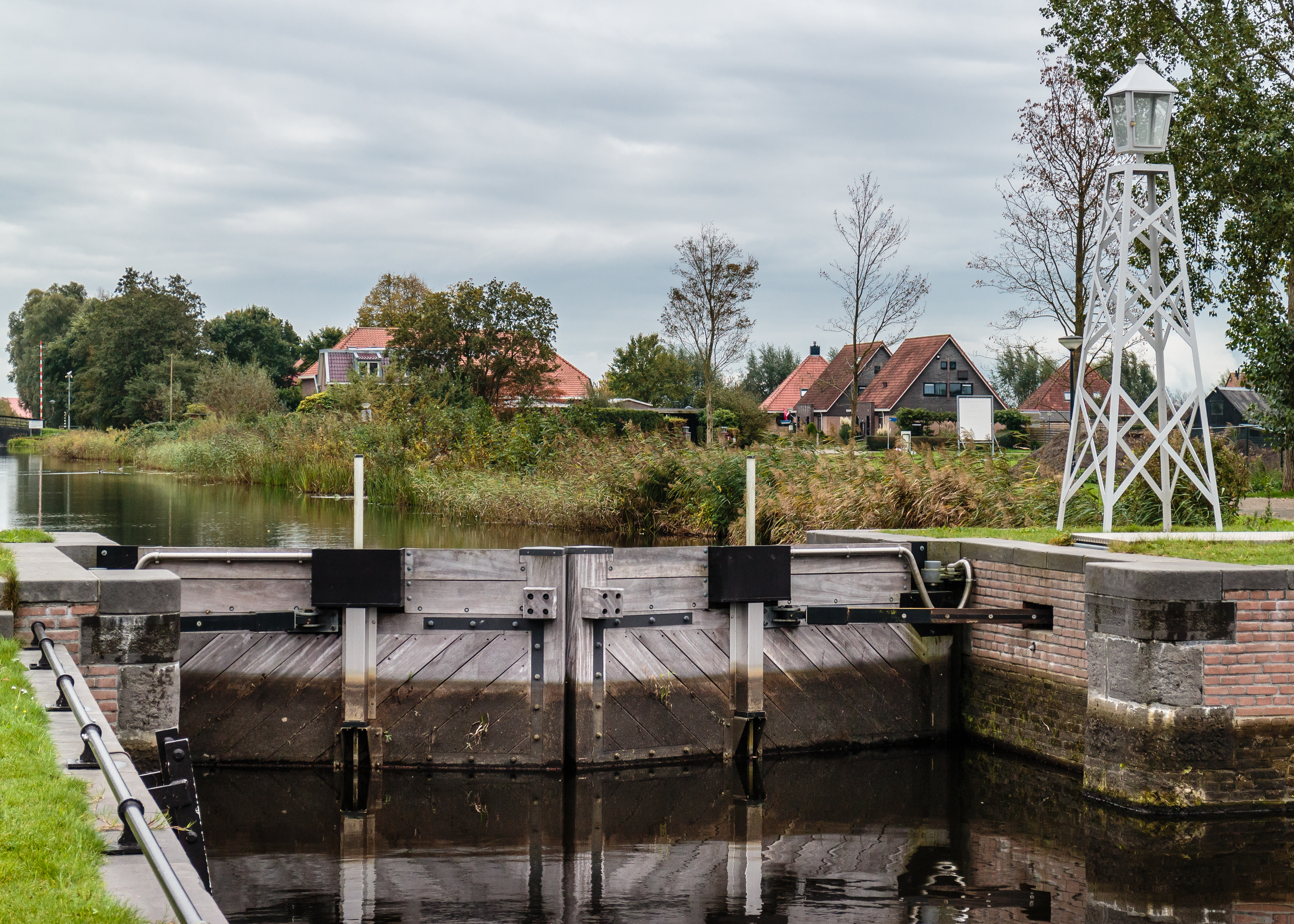
Sluice

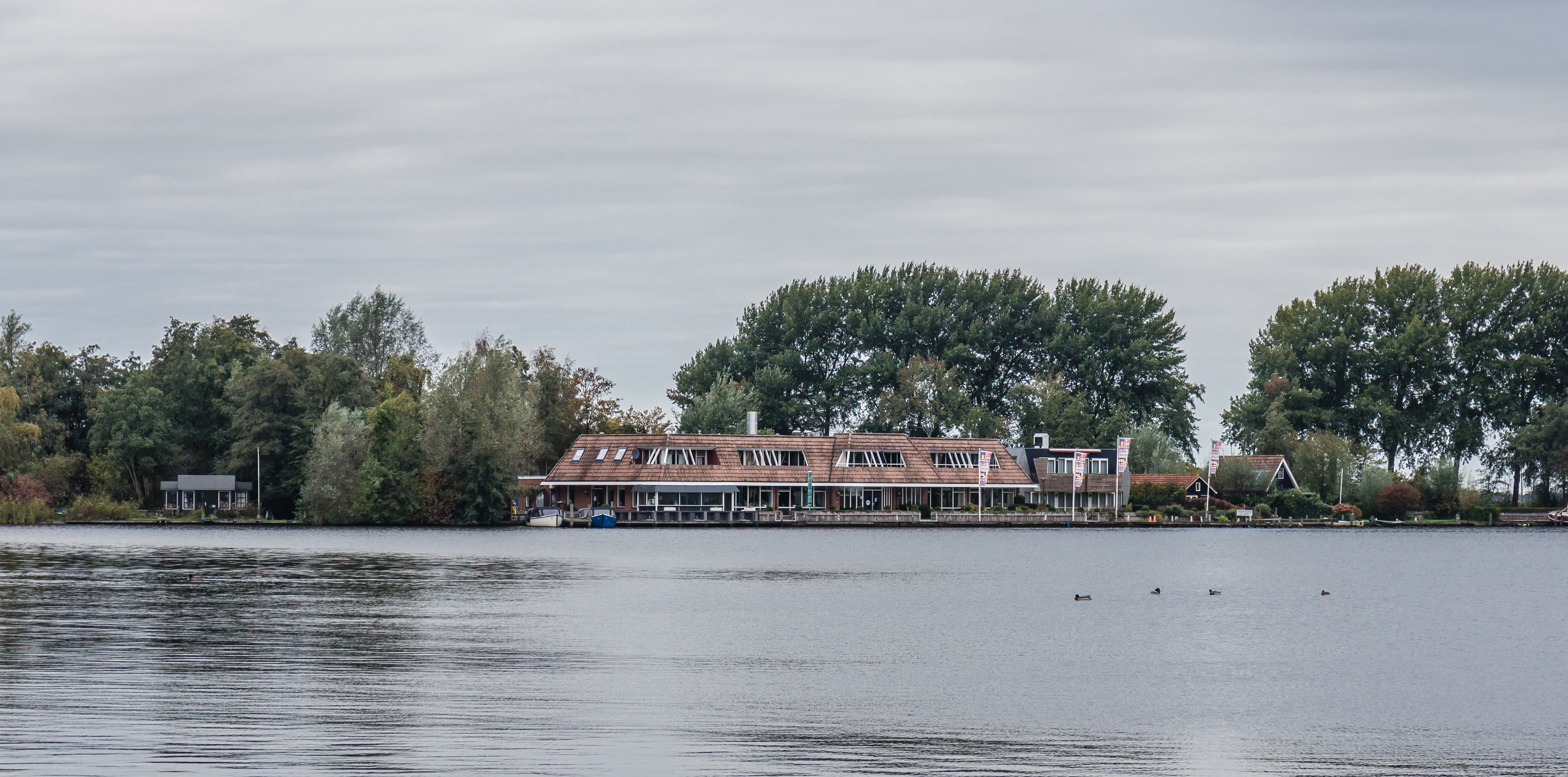
Hotel
