= Houtigehage =

Houtigehage De Houtigehage
- Village
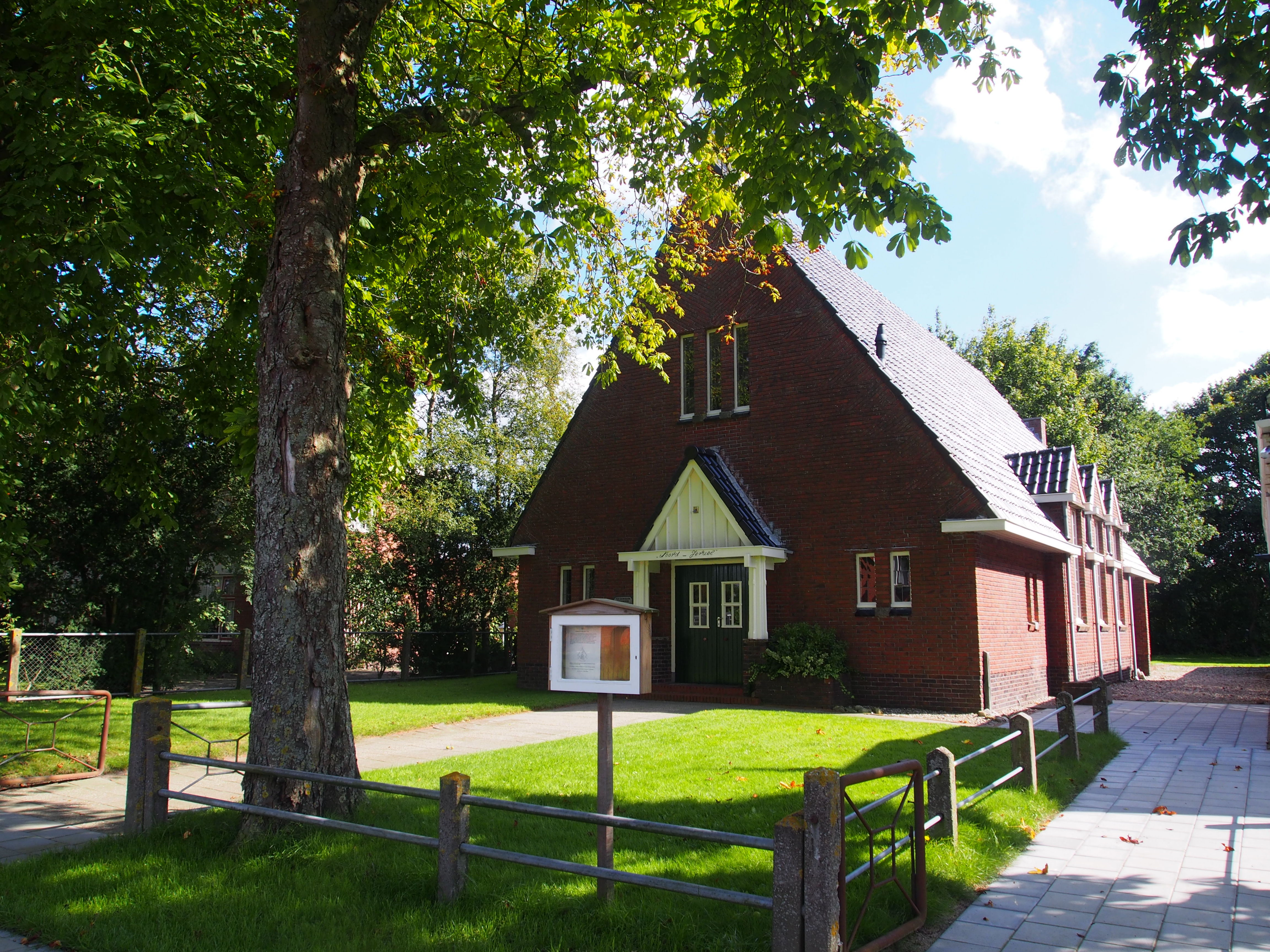
- North Jeruel church

- Flag Coat of arms

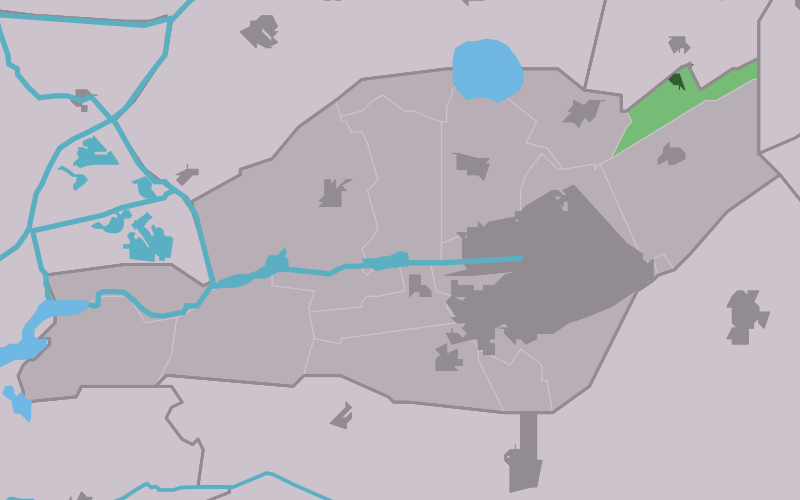
- Location in Smallingerland municipality

- Location in the Netherlands Houtigehage (Netherlands)
- Country: Netherlands
- Province: Friesland
- Municipality: Smallingerland

Area
  - Total: 3.38 km^{2} (1.31 sq mi)
- Elevation: 5 m (16 ft)

Population (2021)
  - Total: 900
  - Density: 270/km^{2} (690/sq mi)
- Time zone: UTC+1 (CET)
  - Summer (DST): UTC+2 (CEST)
- Postal code: 9223
- Dialing code: 0512

Houtigehage (West Frisian: De Houtigehage) is a village in Smallingerland municipality in the province of Friesland, the Netherlands. It had a population of around 905 in January 2017.

== History ==
The village was first mentioned in 1861 as Houtige Hagen, and means "fenced off area with trees". Houtigehage developed as a peat excavation village in the 18th century. Around 1900, it was described as a heath with sod houses. In 1908, a little wooden church is built which was replaced by a stone building in 1938.

After World War II, the village became a communist stronghold. In 1952, a so-called reverse strike was organized. The unemployed of the Houtigehage started to cultivate the area and improve the infrastructure. The authorities did not know what to make of it. At the village meeting, the mayor announced that they would not get paid for the activities, and that there was simply no money for the improvement of infrastructure, because the government refused to provide subsidies. The debate became heated, and the mayor ordered the police to clear the meeting. The villagers took their protest to The Hague where Minister Joris in 't Veld was willing to meet with them, and explained that no application for a subsidy had ever been filed, and that there had been no contact with the mayor or municipality whatsoever. On 28 February 1952, the new improved road to village was opened with a party.

== Gallery ==
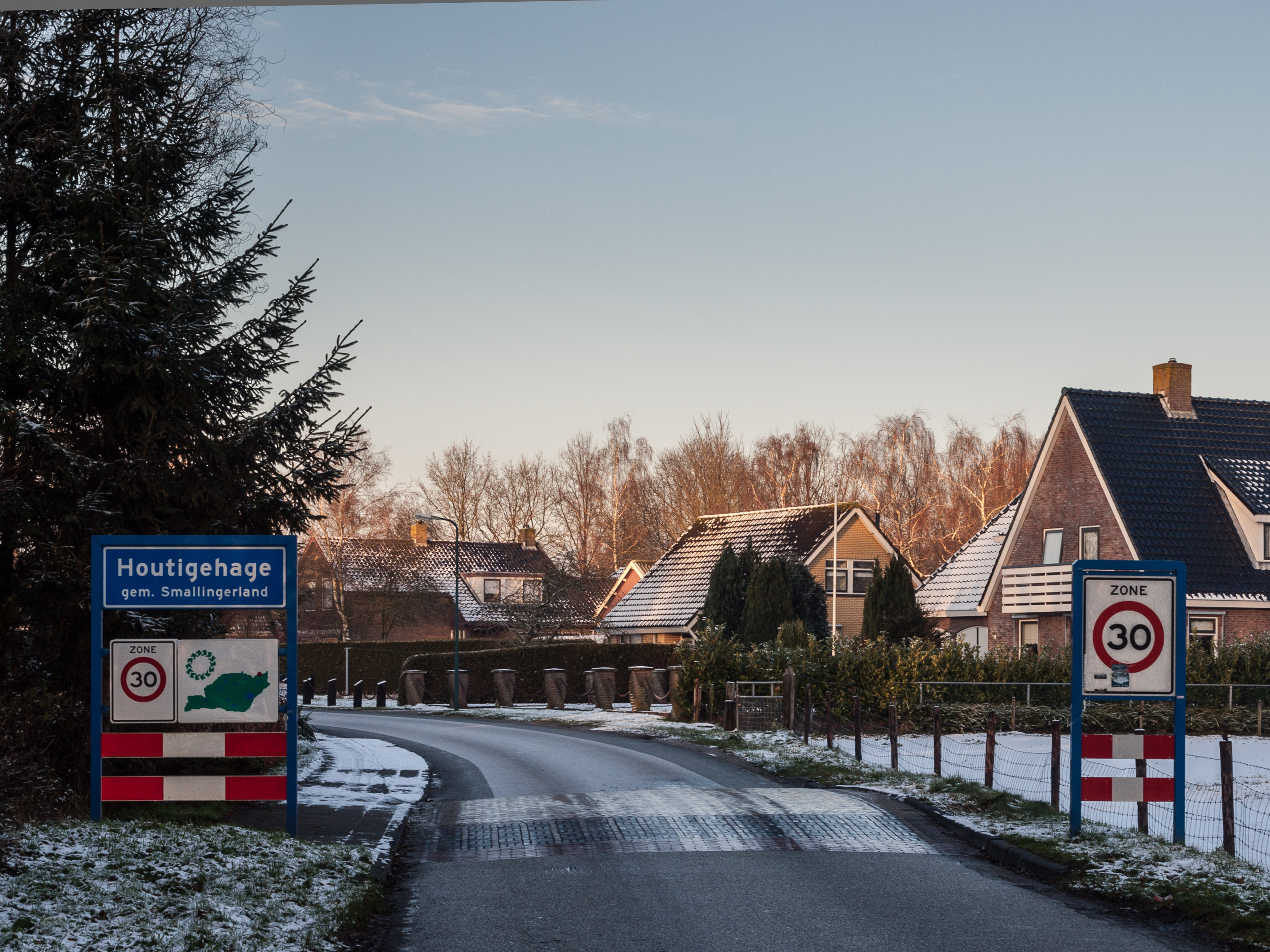
Welcome to Houtigehage

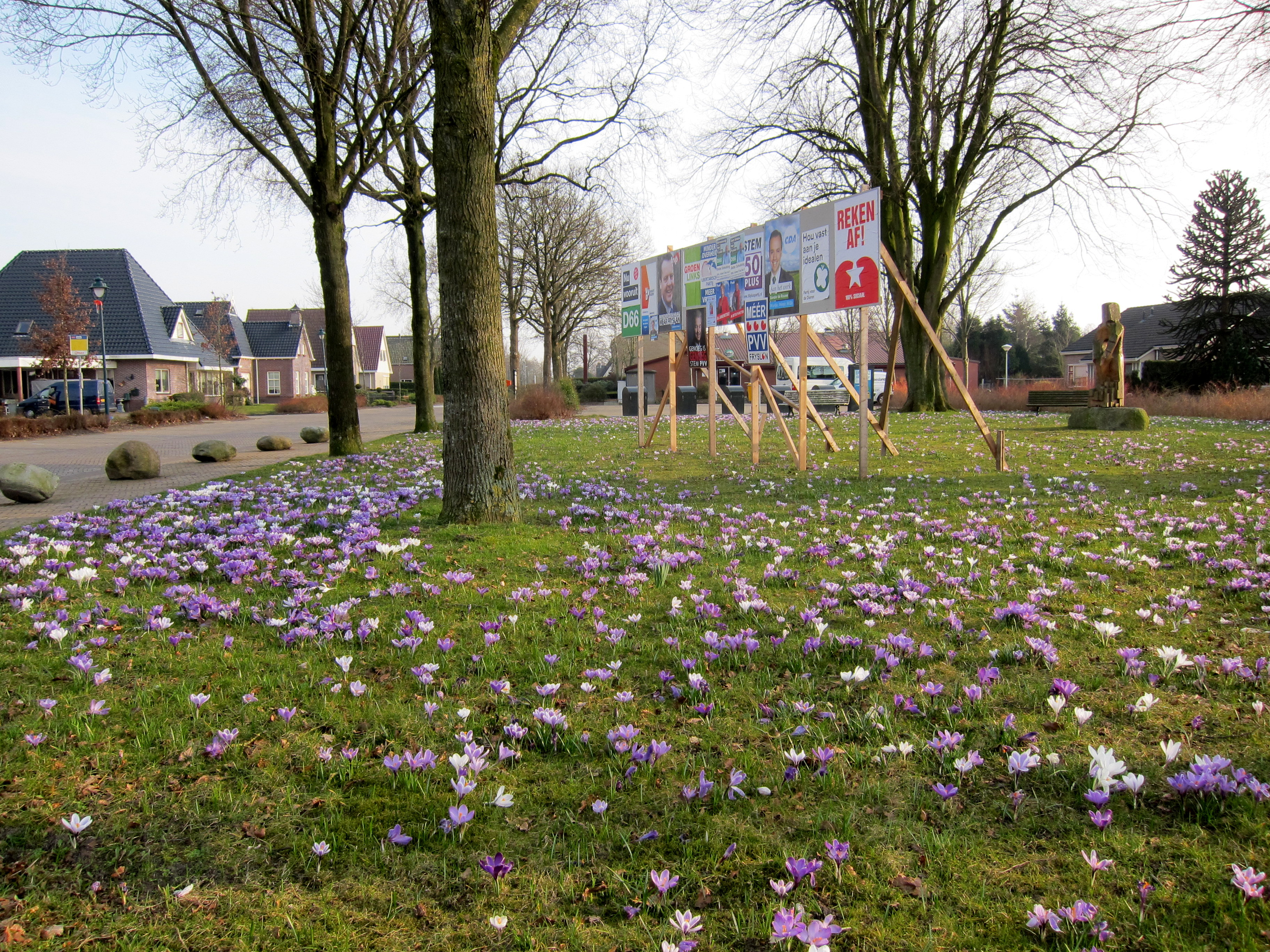
Houtigehage in spring

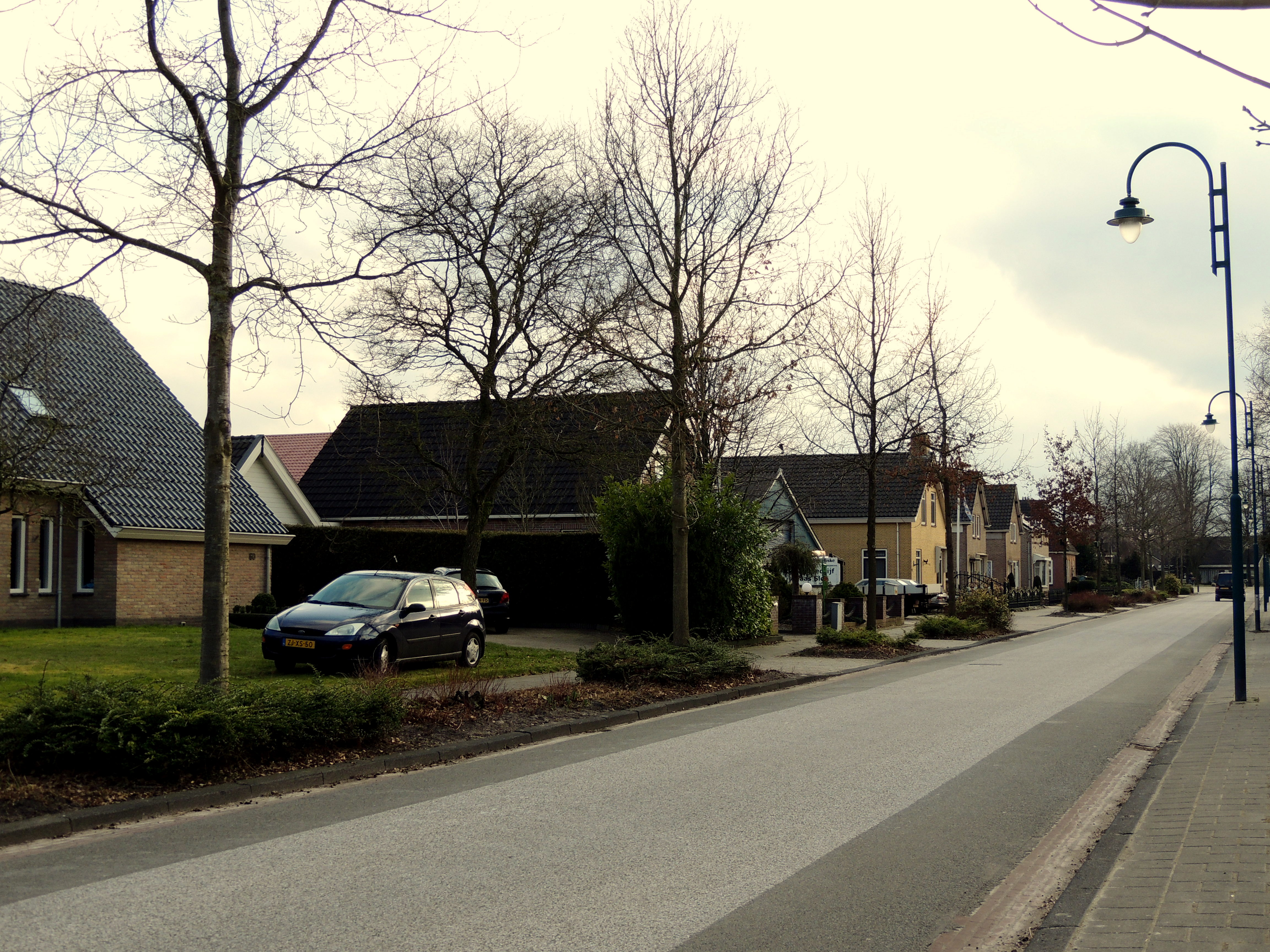
Street view

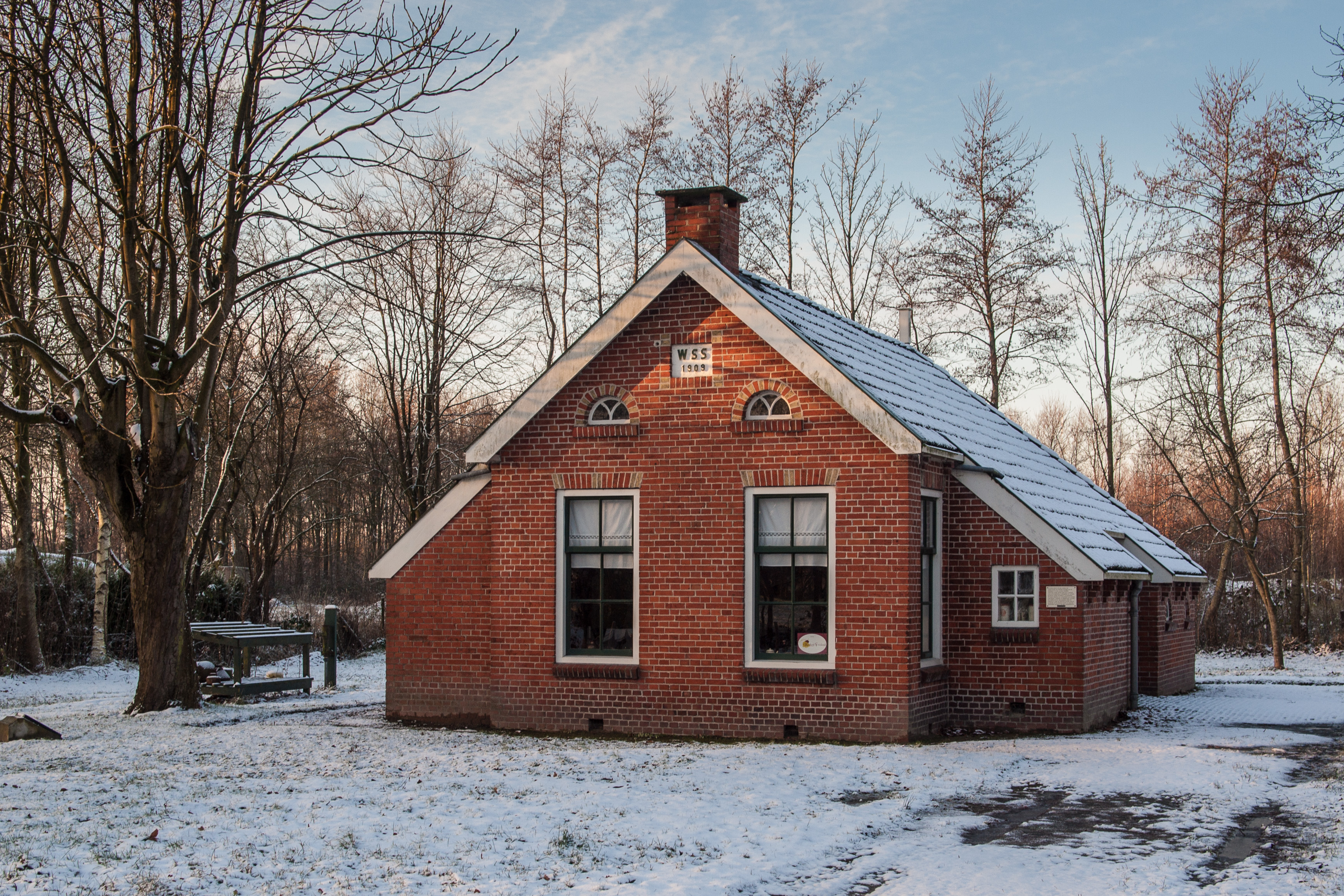
Little house
