= Boornbergum =

Boornbergum Boarnburgum
- Village
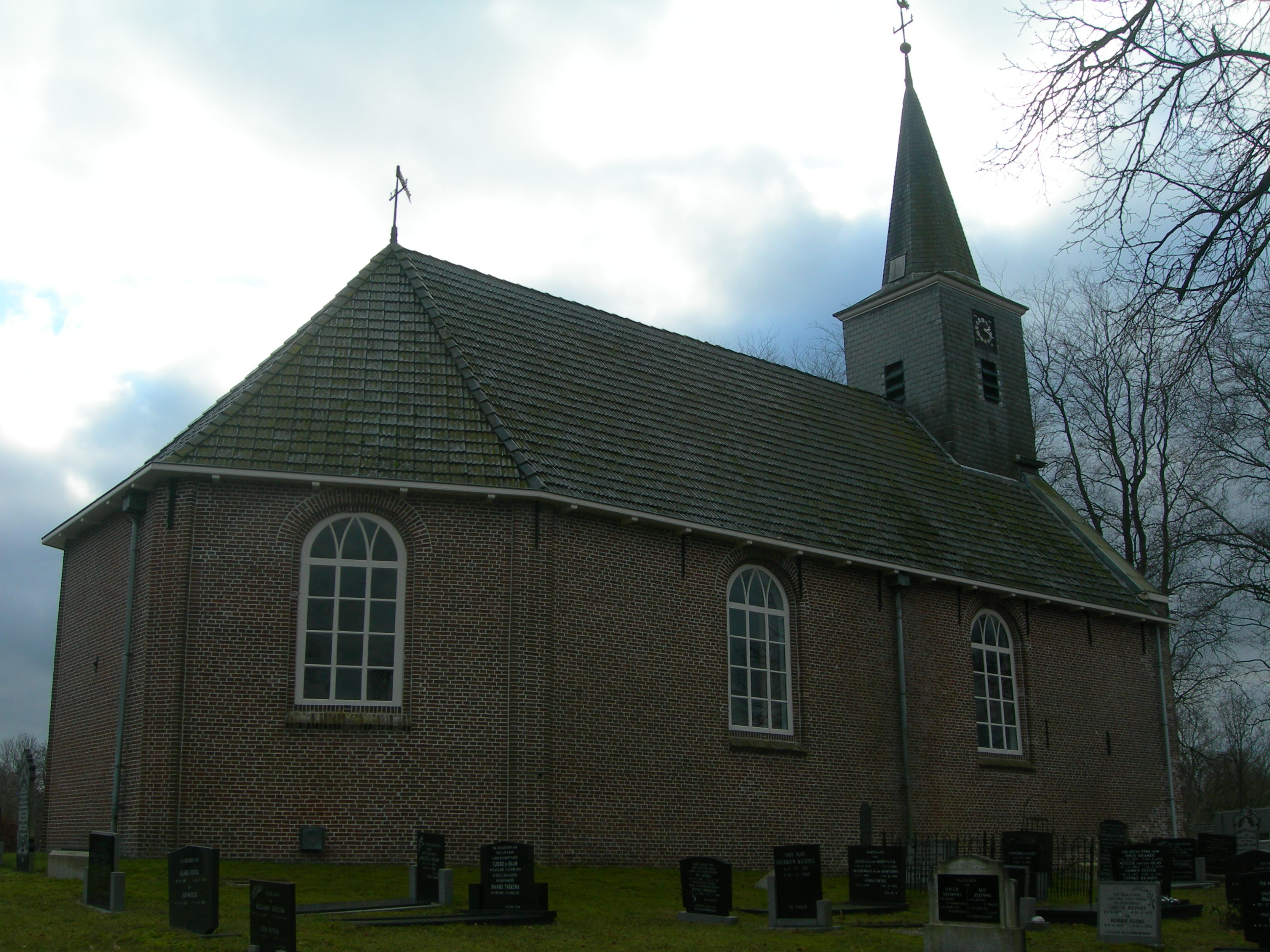
- Boornbergum church

- Flag Coat of arms

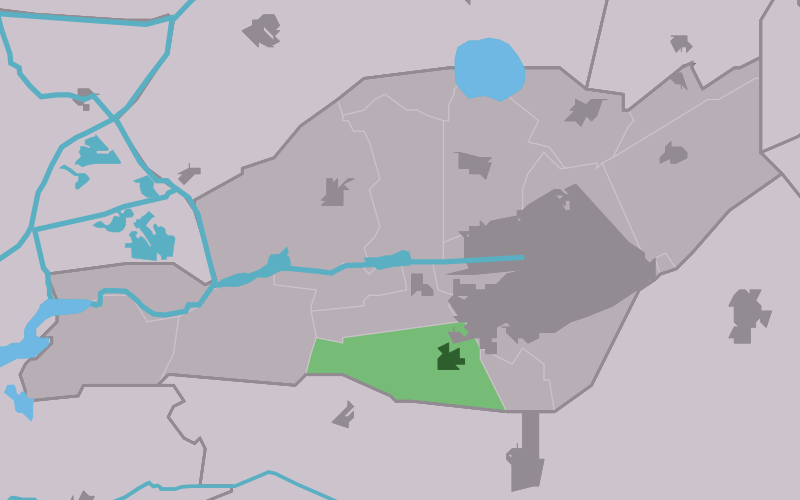
- Location in Smallingerland municipality

- Location in the Netherlands Boornbergum (Netherlands)
- Country: Netherlands
- Province: Friesland
- Municipality: Smallingerland

Area
  - Total: 8.44 km^{2} (3.26 sq mi)
- Elevation: 0.9 m (3.0 ft)

Population (2021)
  - Total: 1,775
  - Density: 210/km^{2} (545/sq mi)
- Time zone: UTC+1 (CET)
  - Summer (DST): UTC+2 (CEST)
- Postal code: 9212
- Dialing code: 0512

Boornbergum (West Frisian: Boarnburgum) is a village in Smallingerland municipality in the province of Friesland, the Netherlands. It had a population of around 1,681 in January 2017.

The village was first mentioned in 1543 as Berghum, and means hill by river Boorne. The Dutch Reformed church was built in 1734 after the bell tower of its medieval predecessor had collapsed the year before. In the 18th century peat was being excavated in the area.

Boornbergum was home to 328 people in 1840. In 1893, a dairy factory opened in Boornbergum. The factory has been turned in office space and apartments.

== Notable residents ==
- Geeske Krol-Benedictus – Frisian language activist and politician
