= Opeinde =

Opeinde De Pein
- Village
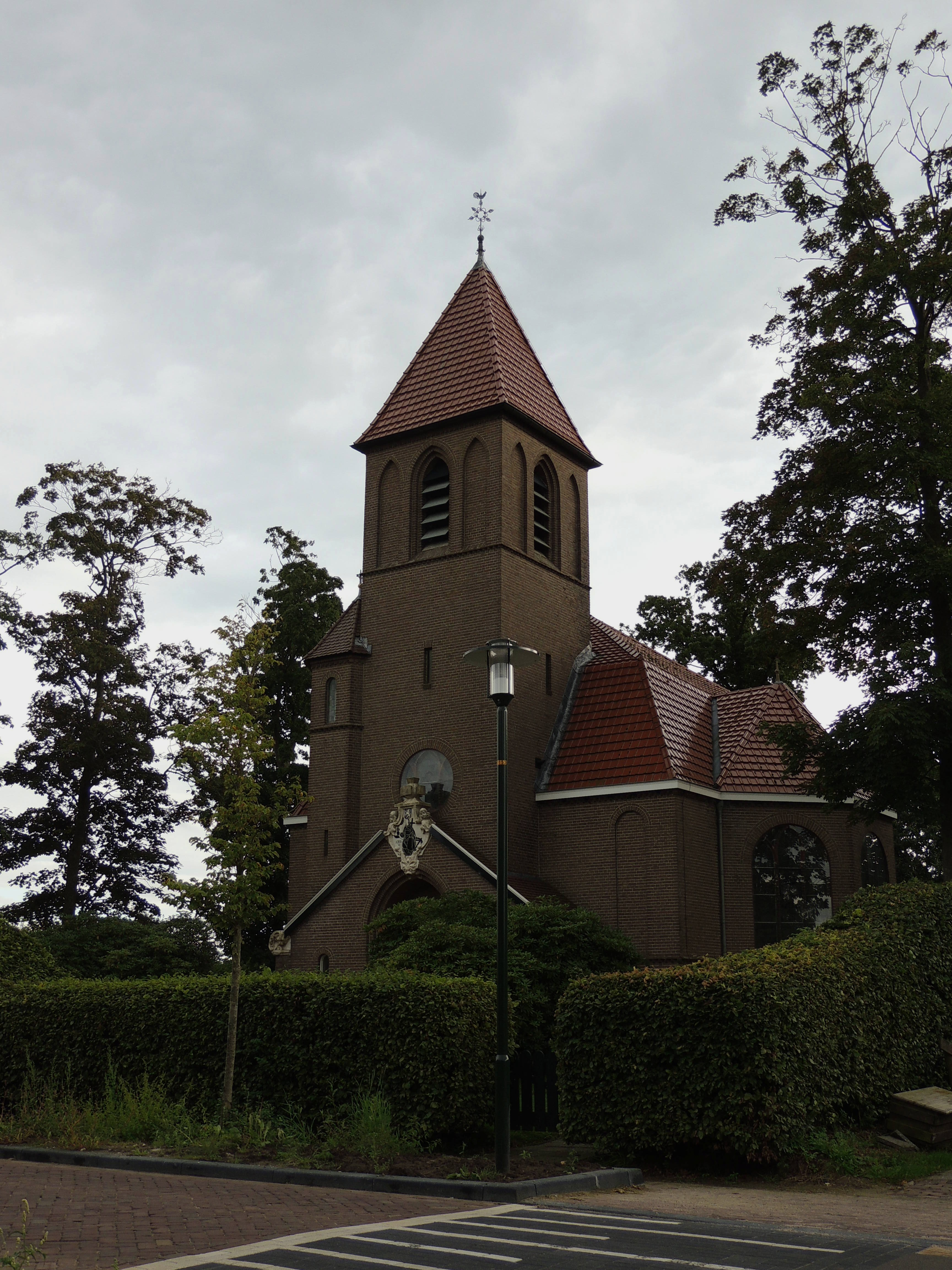
- Opeinde church

- Flag Coat of arms

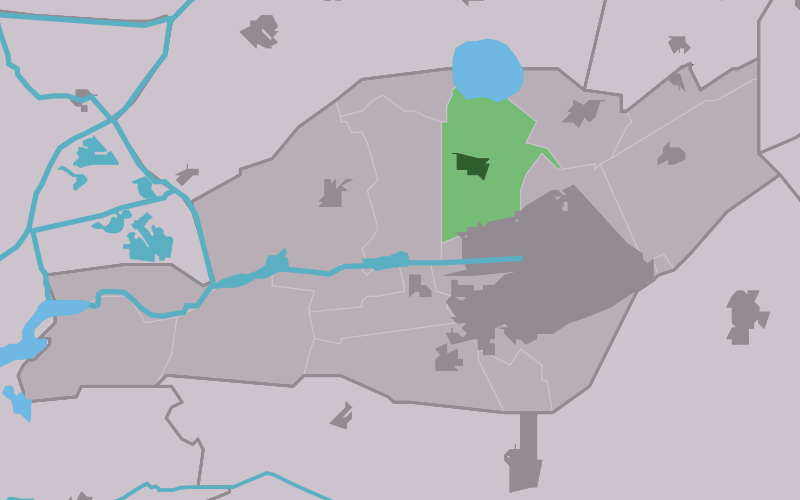
- Location in Smallingerland municipality

- Location in the Netherlands Opeinde (Netherlands)
- Country: Netherlands
- Province: Friesland
- Municipality: Smallingerland

Area
  - Total: 9.25 km^{2} (3.57 sq mi)
- Elevation: 2.0 m (6.6 ft)

Population (2021)
  - Total: 1,745
  - Density: 189/km^{2} (489/sq mi)
- Time zone: UTC+1 (CET)
  - Summer (DST): UTC+2 (CEST)
- Postal code: 9218
- Dialing code: 0512

Opeinde (West Frisian: De Pein) is a village in the Dutch province of Friesland. It is a part of the municipality of Smallingerland, and lies about 5 km north of Drachten.

It had a population of around 1,656 in January 2017.

== History ==
The village was first mentioned in 1439 as "Wp an endde", and means "upper end". Smallinger- was often added to distinguish from Opende. Opeinde began in the Middle Ages on a sandy ridge along the Kommisjewei. In 1883, the canal was widened and a village developed at the bridge. The Dutch Reformed church was built in 1908 as a replacement of a medieval church.

Opeinde was home to 412 people in 1840.

== Intercultural Open University ==
In 1980, the Intercultural Open University opened in Opeinde. The self-appointed professor Jan Roelof Hakemulder started an information and documentation centre on African culture and philosophy. In 2005, the university received national media attention when Mark Rutte announced that the ministry intended to prosecute the university for issuing fake degrees, and advertising worldwide as "one of the leading universities". Hakemulder died in 2008 and the Opeinde branch closed down, however there are still offices in the United States and Spain. See also the insightful article "De Universiteit van Opeinde" by Rob Nanninga in Skepter, nr. 1, 2007.

== Gallery ==
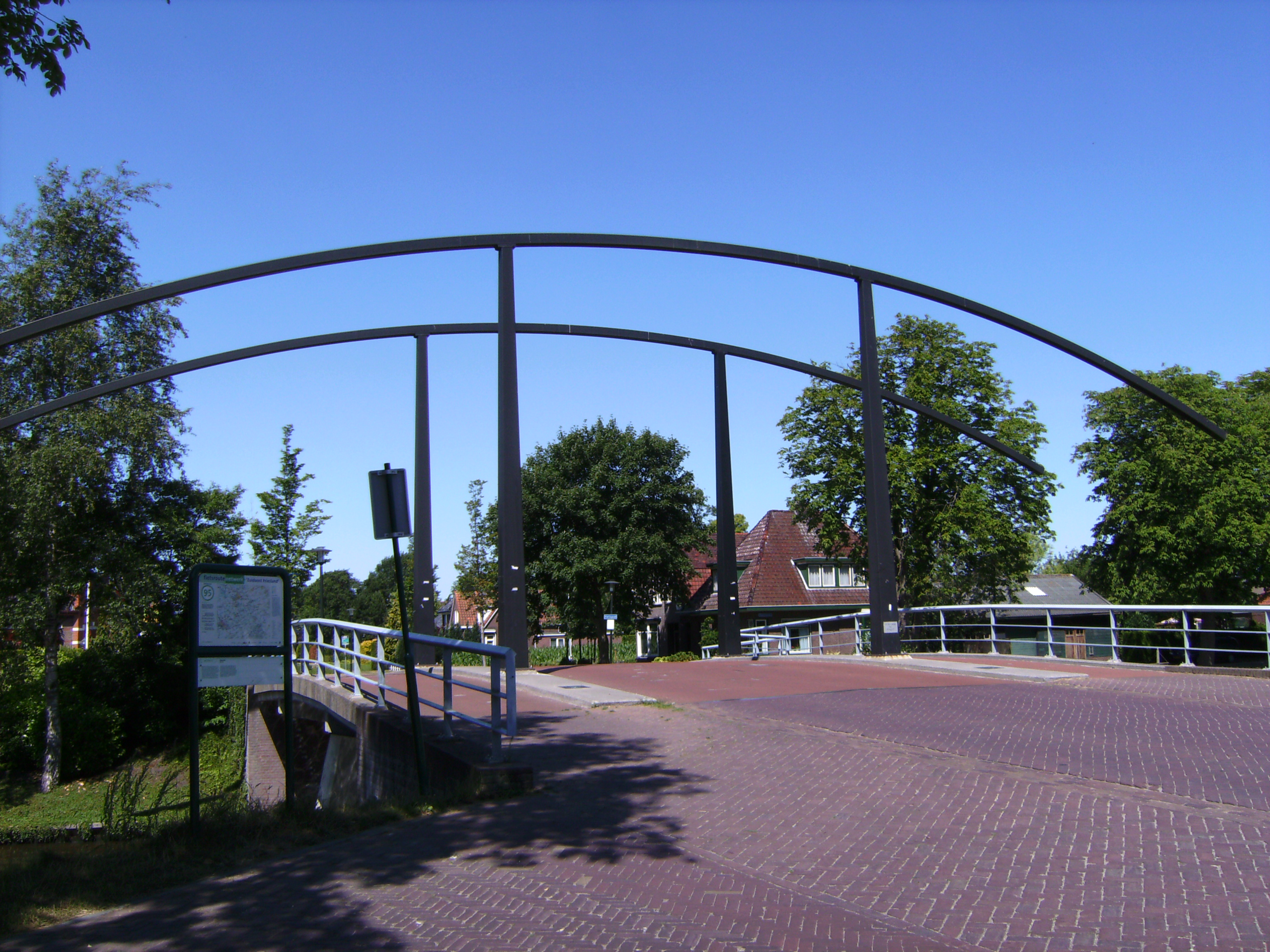
Bridge in Opeinde

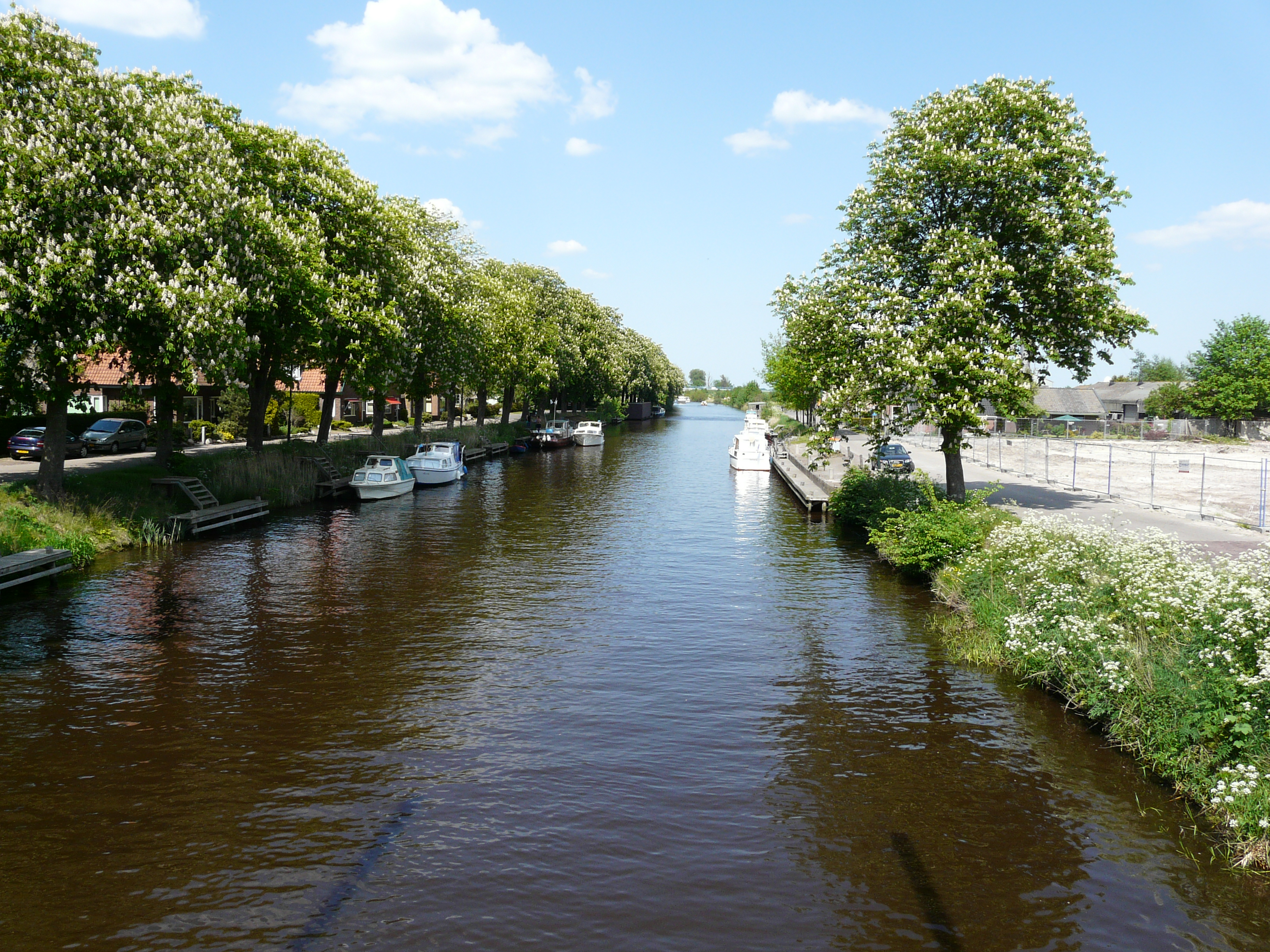
Canal view

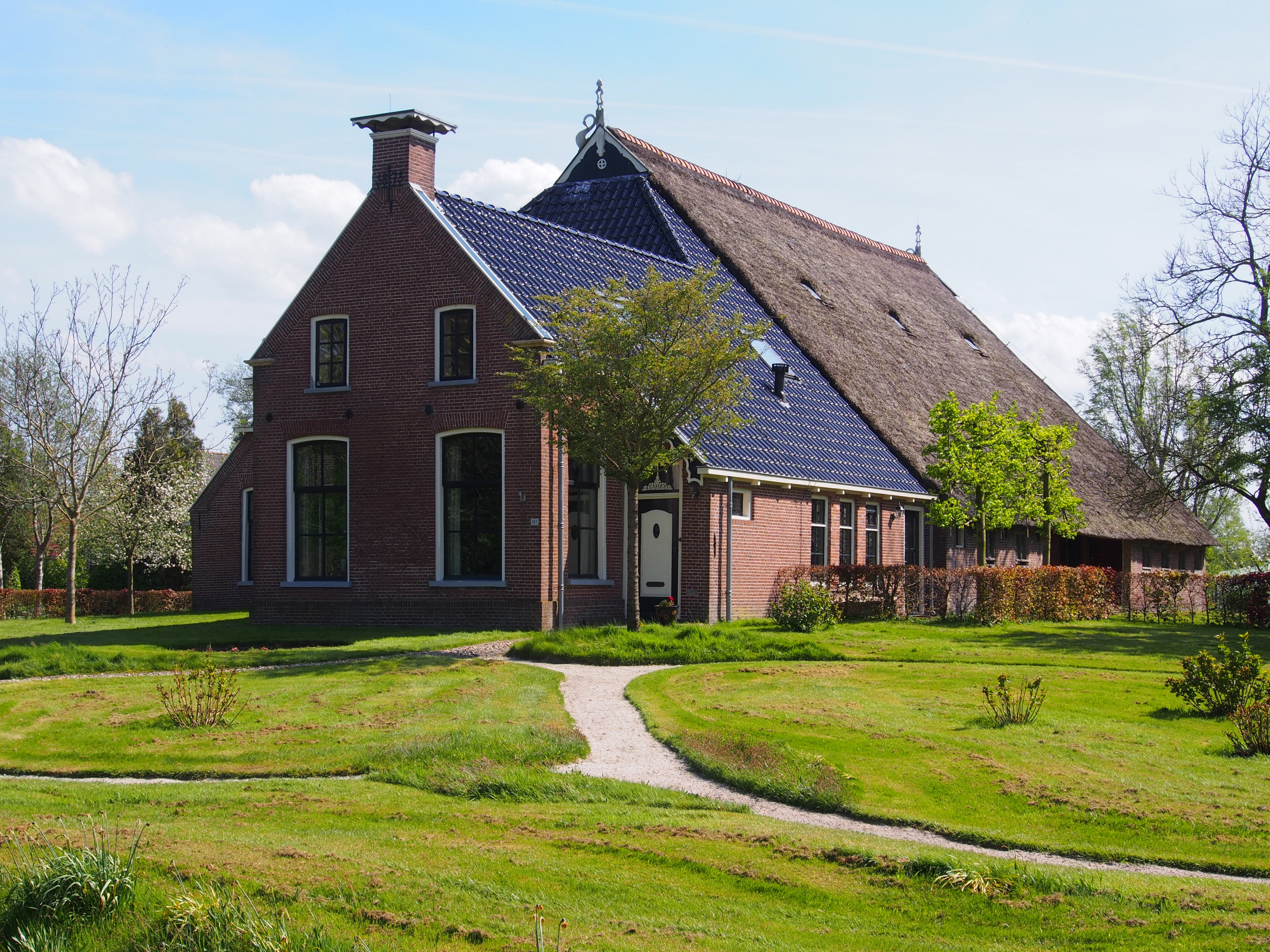
Farm of Opeinde

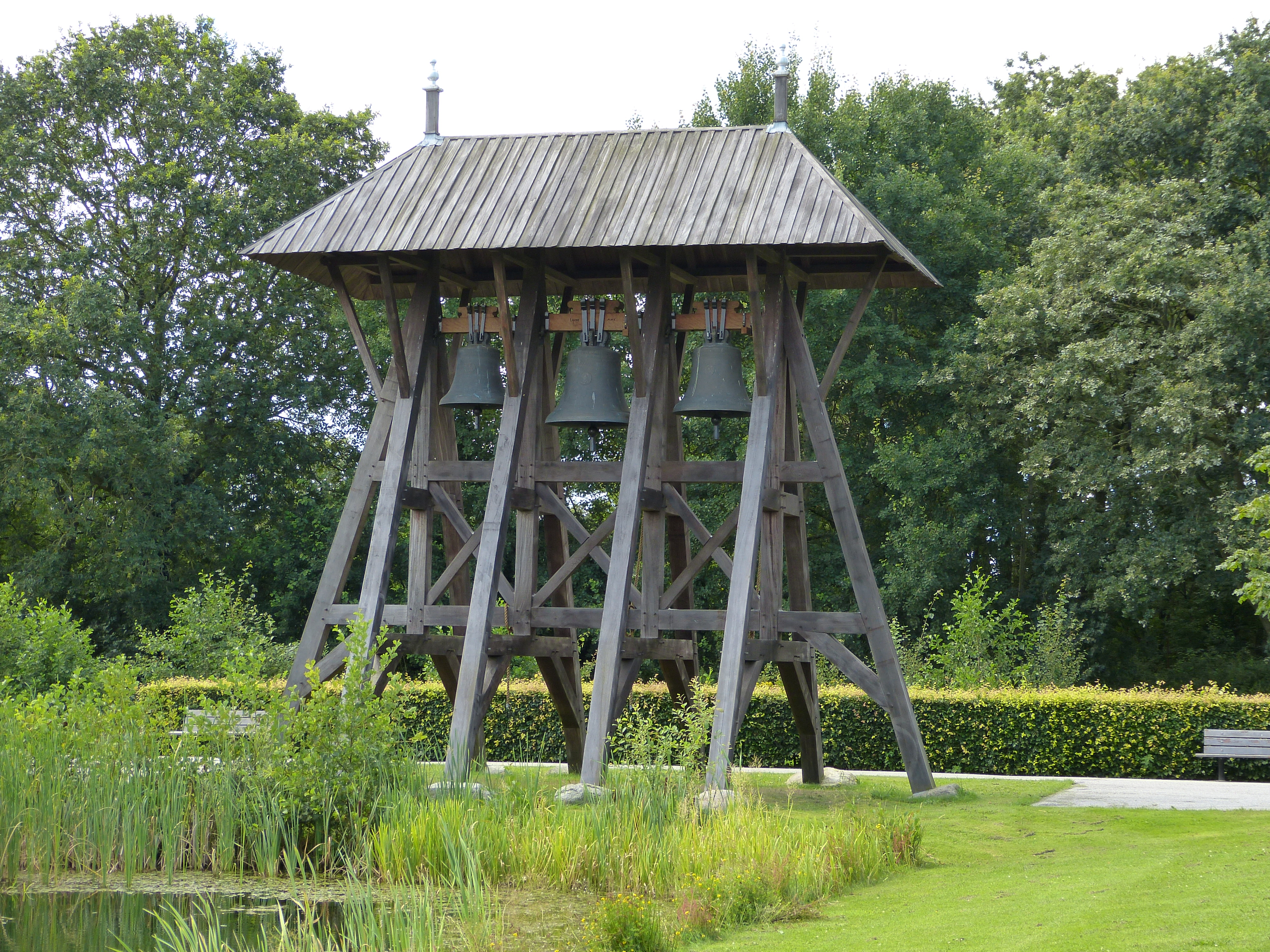
Bell tower of Opeinde
