= De Borgmolen, Grou =

Dutch smock mill

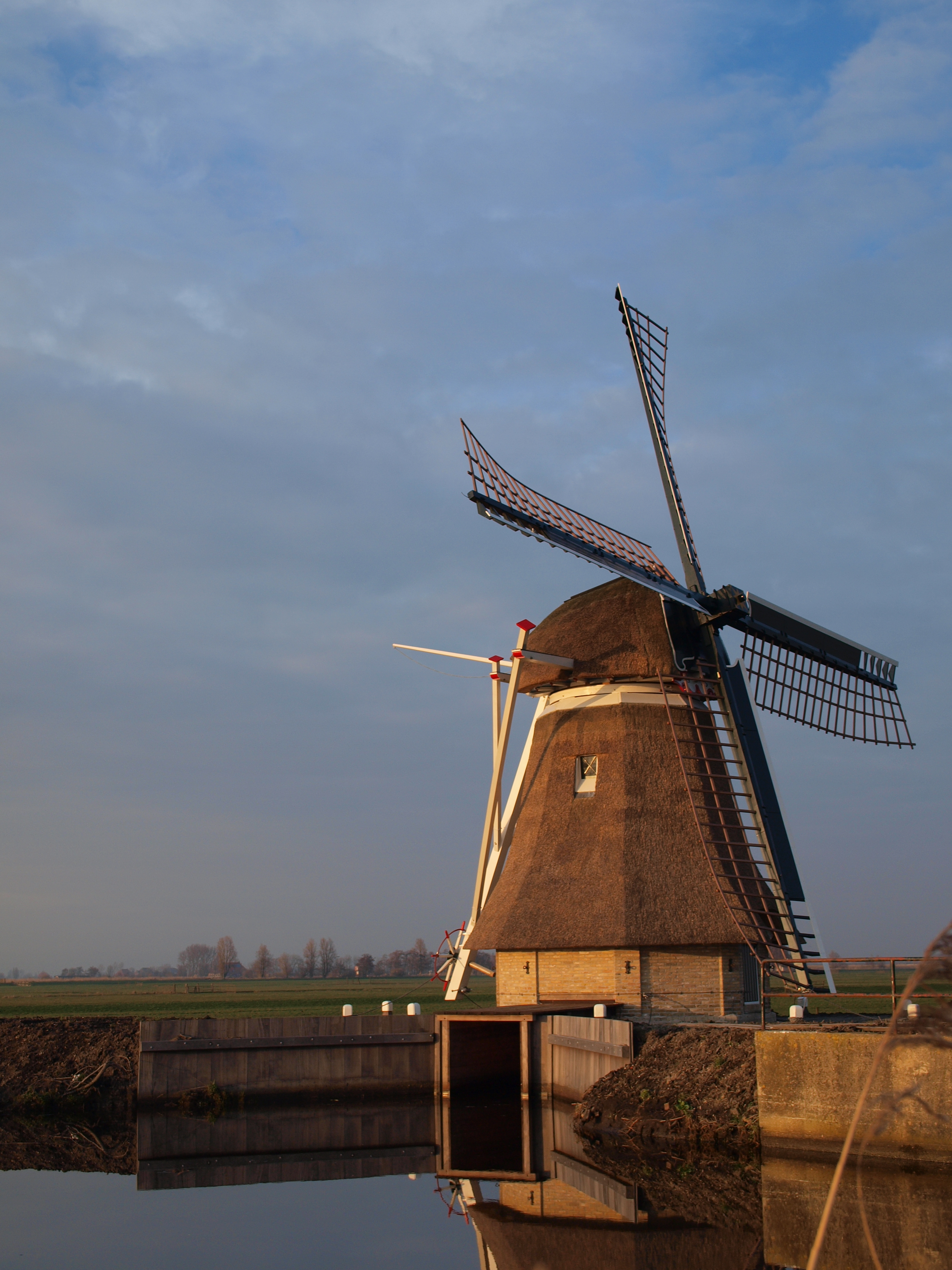
- De Borgmolen, March 2009

Origin
- Mill name: De Borgmolen
- Mill location: Burd 7A, 9001 ZV Grou
- Coordinates: 53°06′21″N 5°52′27″E
- Operator(s): Gemeente Boarnsterhim
- Year built: 1895

Information
- Purpose: Drainage mill
- Type: Smock mill
- Storeys: Two-storey smock
- Base storeys: Single-storey base
- Smock sides: Eight sides
- No. of sails: Four sails
- Type of sails: Common sails
- Windshaft: Wood
- Winding: Tailpole and winch
- Type of pump: Archimedes' screw

De Borgmolen is a smock mill in Grou, Friesland, Netherlands which was built in 2008. Although not in full working order, it can turn in the wind. It is listed as a Rijksmonument, number 22916.

== History ==
De Borgmolen was originally built in 1895 to drain the De Nije Borgkrite polder. It was worked until 1952 when a windmotor replaced it. In 1954, an electric motor took over. In 1955, the mill was advertised for sale to be demolished. The local council offered the Province a 20% subsidy towards the cost of buying and restoring the mill. It cost ƒ3,900 to restore the mill, which is now owned by the Gemeente Boarnsterhim. A restoration of the mill was undertaken in 1975. The mill suffered from subsidence and the sails were removed in October 2003. It was decided to restore the mill at a new location, and it was dismantled in February 2008. The mill was moved 200 metres (220 yd) to the Biggemeer. it was officially opened on 16 October 2008.

== Description ==
De Borgmolen is what the Dutch describe as an grondzeiler. It is a smock mill on a single-storey brick base. The mill is winded by tailpole and winch. The smock and cap are thatched. The sails are Common sails. They have a span of 14.70 metres (48 ft 3 in). The sails are carried on a wooden windshaft. The windshaft also carries the brake wheel which has 54 cogs. This drives the wallower (25 cogs) at the top of the upright shaft. At the bottom of the upright shaft, the crown wheel, which has 33 cogs formerly drove a wooden Archimedes' screw, which is now missing.
