= De Bird, Grou =

Windmill in Grou, Netherlands

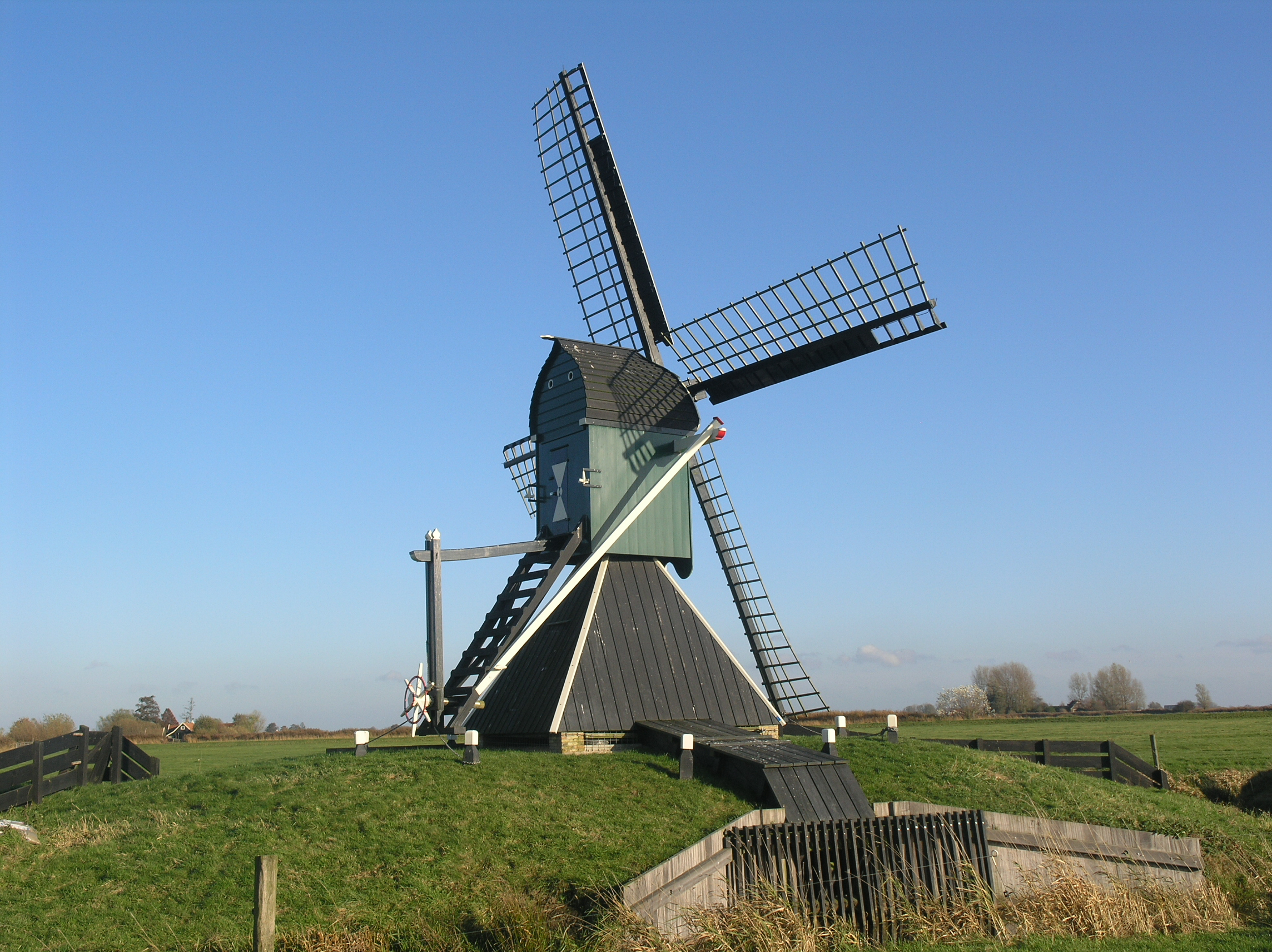
- De Bird, November 2008

Origin
- Mill name: De Bird; De Burd; Koopmansmolen
- Mill location: Burd 22A, 9001 ZW Grou
- Coordinates: 53.0956°N 5.8758°E
- Operator(s): Stichting Poldermolens De Lege Midden
- Year built: 2007

Information
- Purpose: Drainage mill
- Type: Hollow Post Mill
- Roundhouse storeys: Single storey roundhouse
- No. of sails: Four sails
- Type of sails: Common sails
- Windshaft: Wood
- Winding: Tailpole and winch
- Type of pump: Archimedes' screw

De Bird is a Hollow Post mill in Grou, Friesland, Netherlands which was built in the 18th century. The mill is also known as De Burd and Koopmans Molen. Although not in full working order, it can turn in the wind. It is listed as a Rijksmonument, number 22915.

== History ==
Although a mill has stood on this site since 1640, De Bird was built in the 18th century. It was built to drain the De Burd polder, which was part of the Groot Jetsma farm. De Bird was built for A J de Jong. A later owner was Simon Koopmans, giving the mill its alternate name of Koopmans Molen. In 1878, the mill was sold at auction for ƒ500.

Restorations of the mill were undertaken in 1950, 1960 and 1964. In November 1972, the mill was damaged in a storm. It was during the subsequent repair work that the roundhouse roof was tiled with pantiles. A further restoration was undertaken in 2004, during which the roundhouse roof was boarded, as it had been previously. The mill is not complete, as the Archimedes' screw is missing, although it can turn by wind. The mill was officially reopened on 18 November 2005. Previously in the ownership of the Gemeente Boarnsterhim, De Bird is now owned by Stichting Poldermolens De Lege Midden (English: Lege Midden Polder Mills Society).

== Description ==
De Bird is what the Dutch describe as an spinnenkop. It is a hollow post mill on a single storey square roundhouse. The mill is winded by tailpole and winch. The roundhouse and mill body are covered in vertical boards, while the roof of the mill is boarded horizontally. The sails are Common sails. They have a span of 12.20 metres (40 ft 0 in). The sails are carried on a wooden windshaft. The windshaft also carries the brake wheel which has 43 cogs. This drives the wallower (21 cogs) at the top of the upright shaft. At the bottom of the upright shaft, the crown wheel, which has 34 cogs formerly drove an Archimedes' screw, which is now missing. The axle of the Archimedes' screw was 925 millimetres (3 ft 0 in) diameter and the screw was inclined at 21½°.
