= Poppenwier =

Poppingawier Poppenwier
- Village
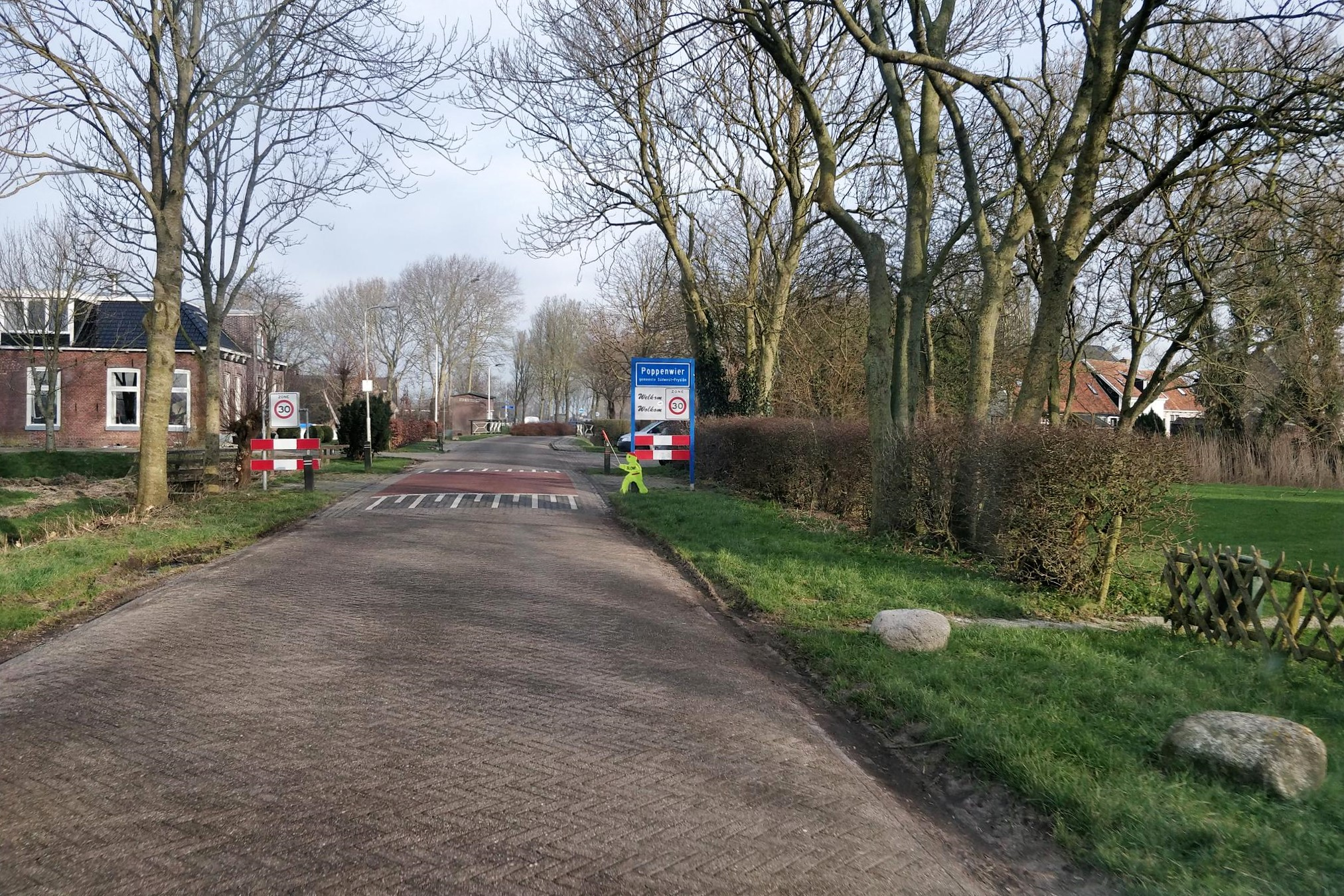
- Poppenwier

- Flag Coat of arms

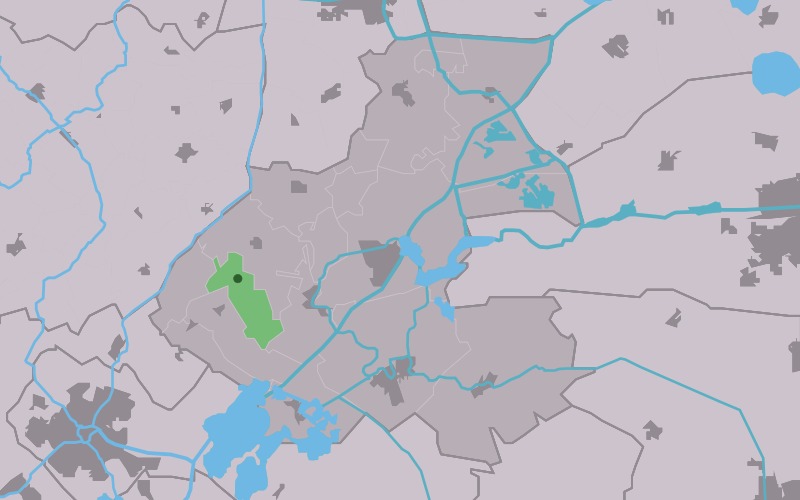
- Location in the former Boarnsterhim municipality

- Location in the Netherlands Poppingawier (Netherlands)
- Country: Netherlands
- Province: Friesland
- Municipality: Súdwest-Fryslân

Area
  - Total: 4.83 km^{2} (1.86 sq mi)
- Elevation: −0.1 m (−0.33 ft)

Population (2021)
  - Total: 175
  - Density: 36.2/km^{2} (93.8/sq mi)
- Time zone: UTC+1 (CET)
  - Summer (DST): UTC+2 (CEST)
- Postal code: 9013
- Dialing code: 0566

Poppenwier (West Frisian pronunciation: [popm̩ˈʋiər]; Dutch: Poppingawier) is a village in Súdwest-Fryslân municipality in the province of Friesland, the Netherlands. It had a population of around 170 in January 2017.

== History ==
The village was first mentioned in 1401 as Popengwere, and means "terp of the people of Poppa (person)". Poppenwier is a terp (artificial living hill) village from the early middle ages. The small terp is densely build up with a rectangular structure and a circle around the church. It was the furthest landinwards terp of Friesland.

In the late middle ages, the monastery Engwerd was located near the village. The Dutch Reformed church was built in 1860 as a replacement for its medieval predecessor.

Poppenwier was home to 229 people in 1840. Until the mid-19th century, the village was only accessible by water. Before 2011, the village was part of the Boarnsterhim municipality and before 1984 it belonged to Rauwerdhem municipality.

== Gallery ==
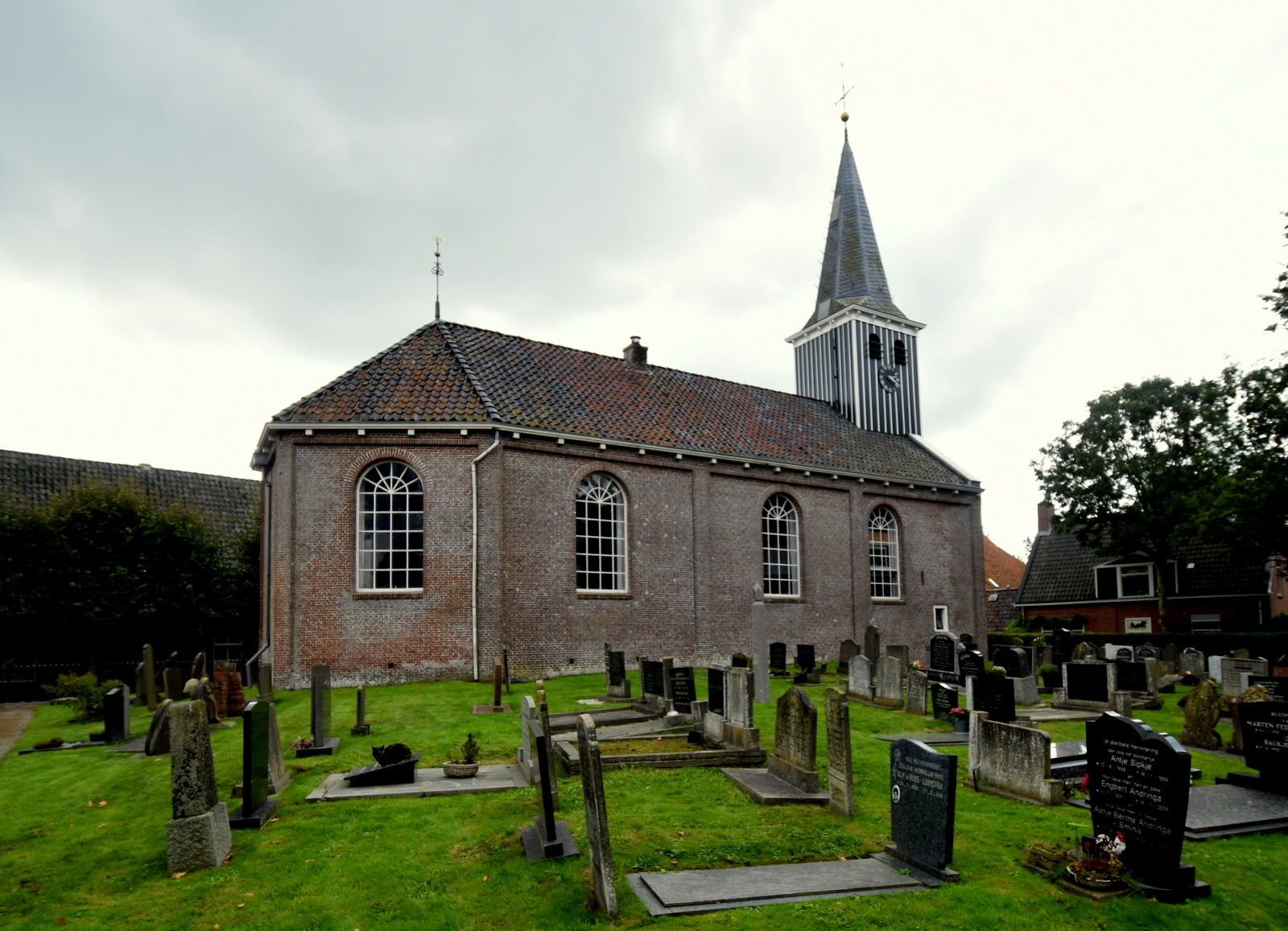
Church in Poppenwier

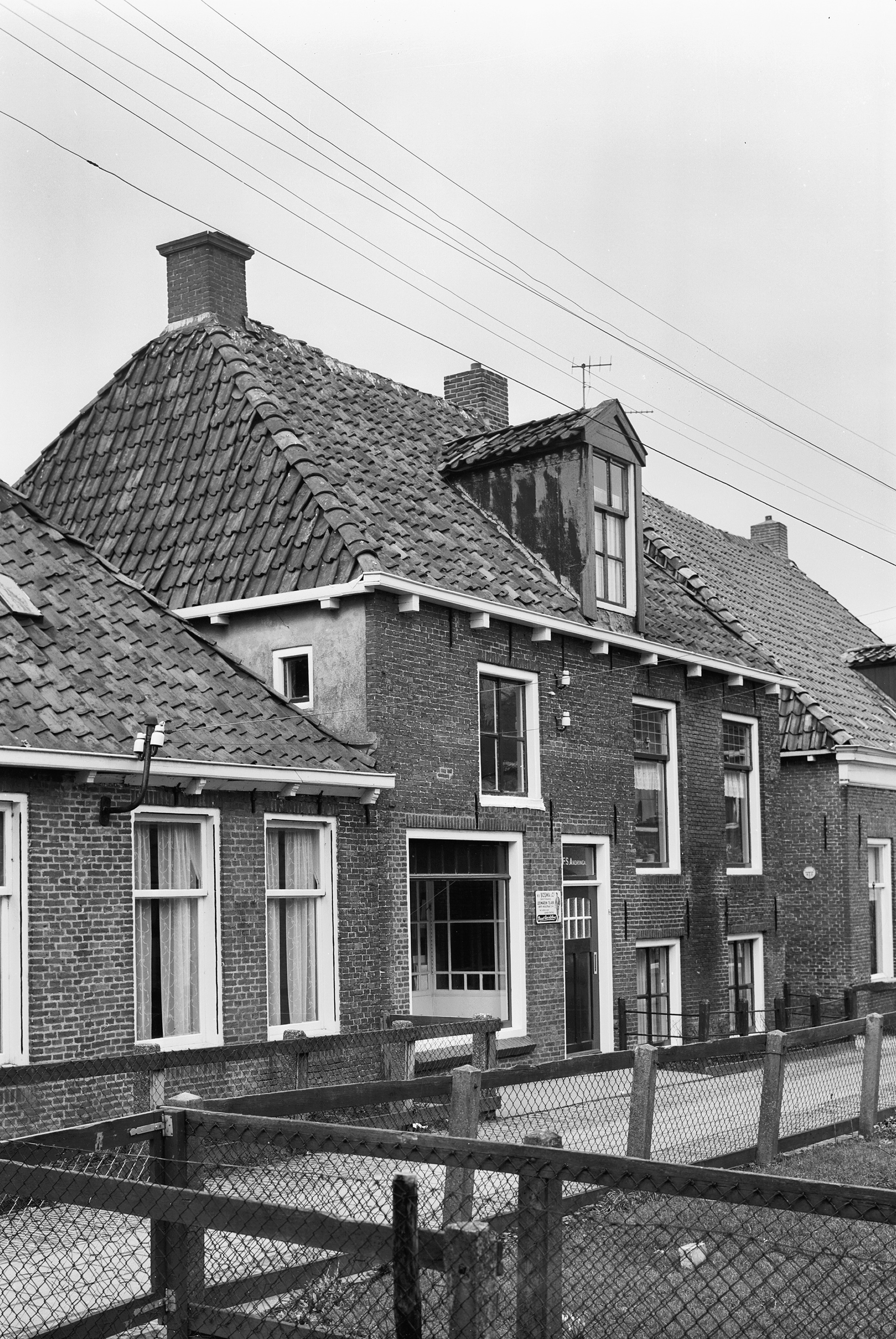
Houses in Poppenwier

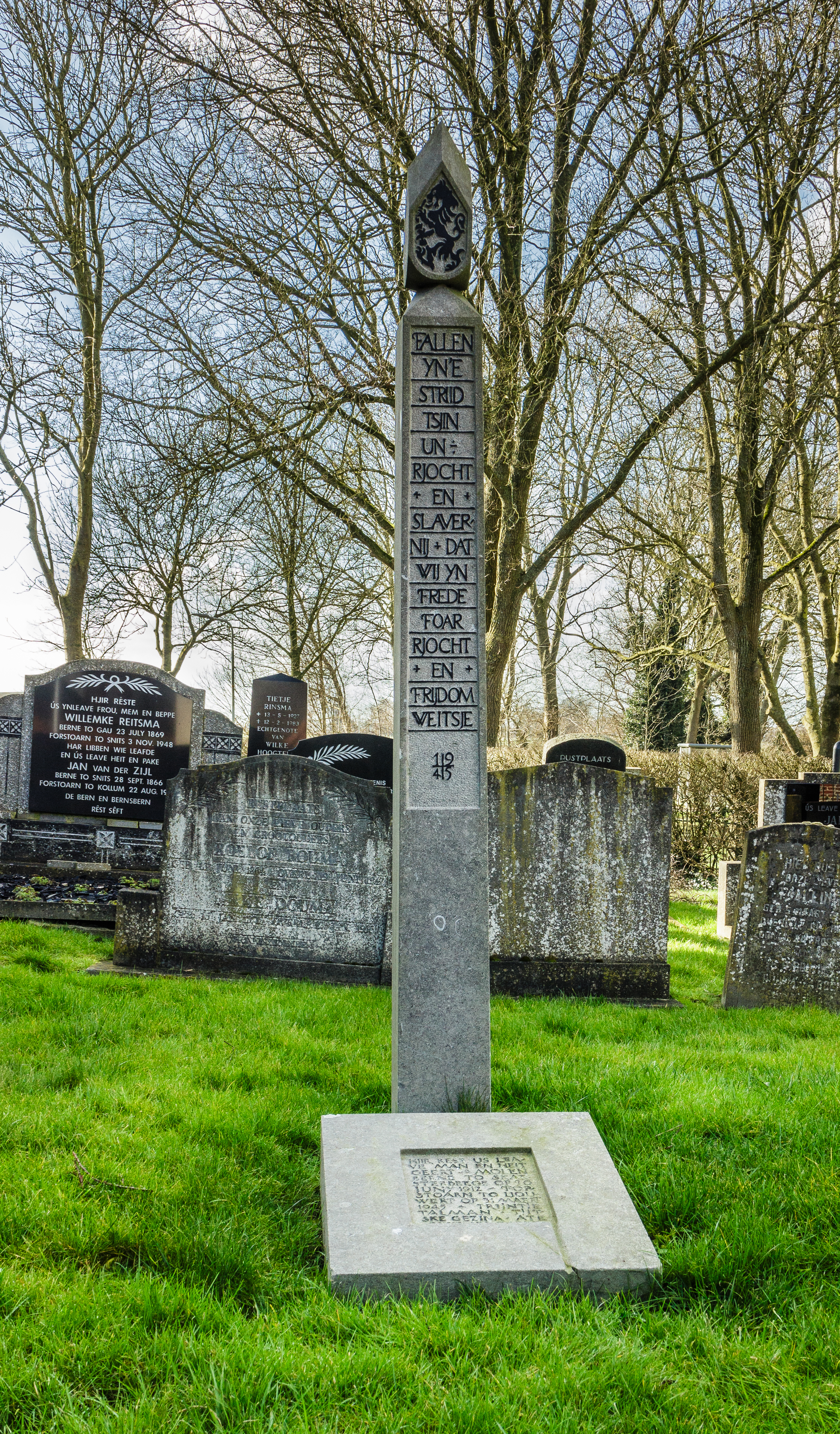
War memorial.
