= Raerd =

Rauwerd Raerd
- Village
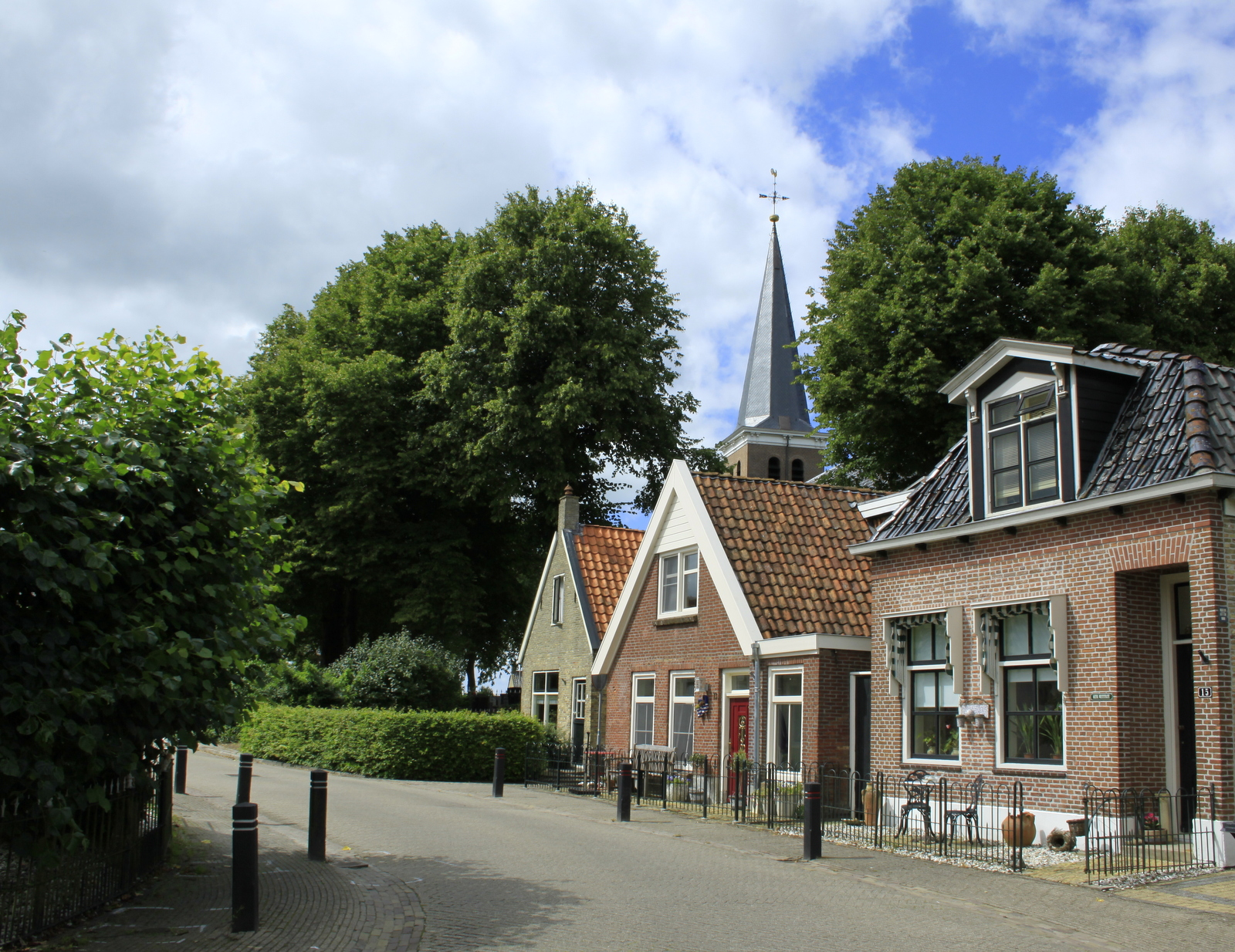

- Flag Coat of arms

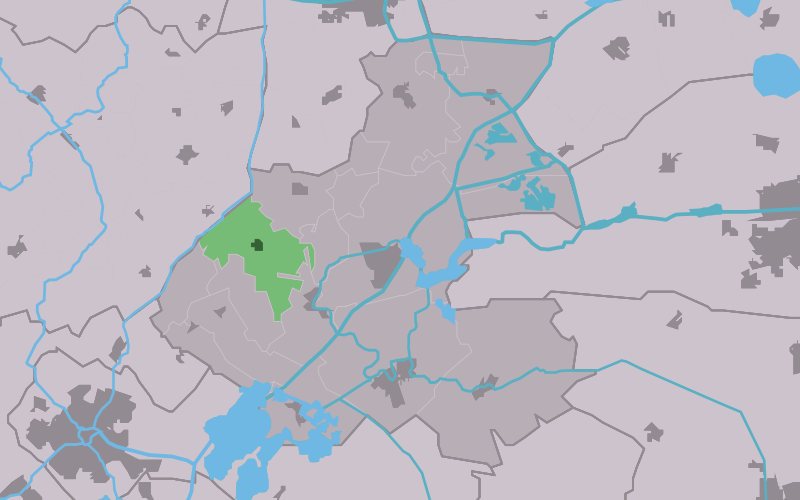
- Location in the former Boarnsterhim municipality

- Location in the Netherlands Rauwerd (Netherlands)
- Country: Netherlands
- Province: Friesland
- Municipality: Súdwest-Fryslân

Area
  - Total: 7.67 km^{2} (2.96 sq mi)
- Elevation: −0.1 m (−0.33 ft)

Population (2021)
  - Total: 660
  - Density: 86/km^{2} (220/sq mi)
- Time zone: UTC+1 (CET)
  - Summer (DST): UTC+2 (CEST)
- Postal code: 9012
- Dialing code: 0566

Raerd (Dutch: Rauwerd) is a village in Súdwest-Fryslân municipality in the province Friesland, the Netherlands. It had a population of around 630 in January 2017.

== History ==
The village was first mentioned in the 13th century as Rawertham, and means "terp covered in reed". In the 11th or 12th century, a dike was built along the Moezel river. Raerd is a terp (artificial living hill) village with a radial structure dating from the early middle ages. The village was located near the former Middelzee.

The Dutch Reformed church was built in 1814 as a replacement of its medieval predecessor. When the stins Jongema State was built is unknown, but it was destroyed in 1515 by Saxon mercenaries, however the gate house remains. A 19th century villa is located at the former stins, but it is still surrounded by a double moat. The forest around the estate are currently owned by It Fryske Gea and is a park with a large colony of rooks and herons. The park has limited access during breeding season.

Raerd was home to 549 people in 1840. Before 2011, the village was part of the Boarnsterhim municipality and before 1984 it was the seat of Rauwerdhem municipality.

== Gallery ==
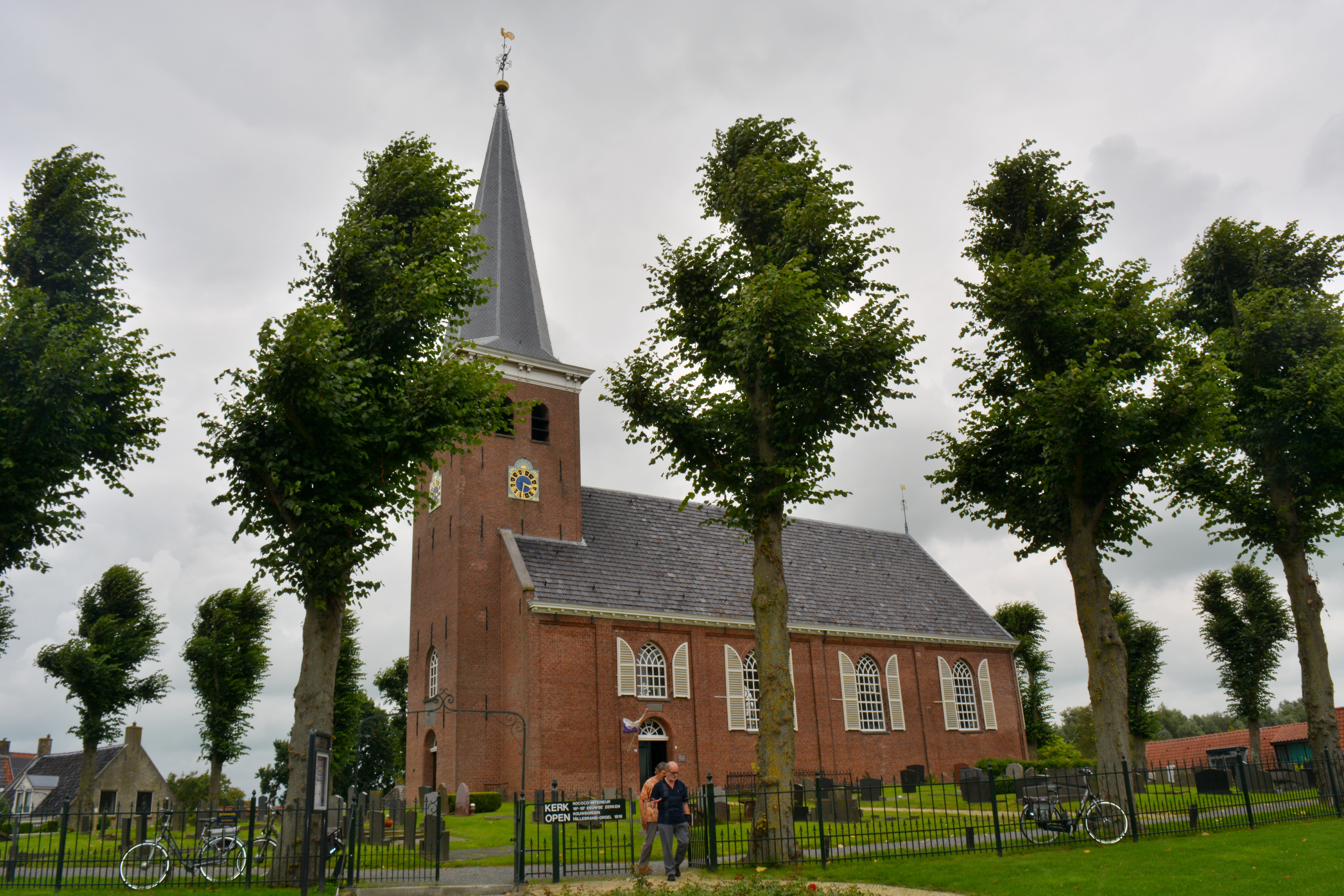
Church of Raerd

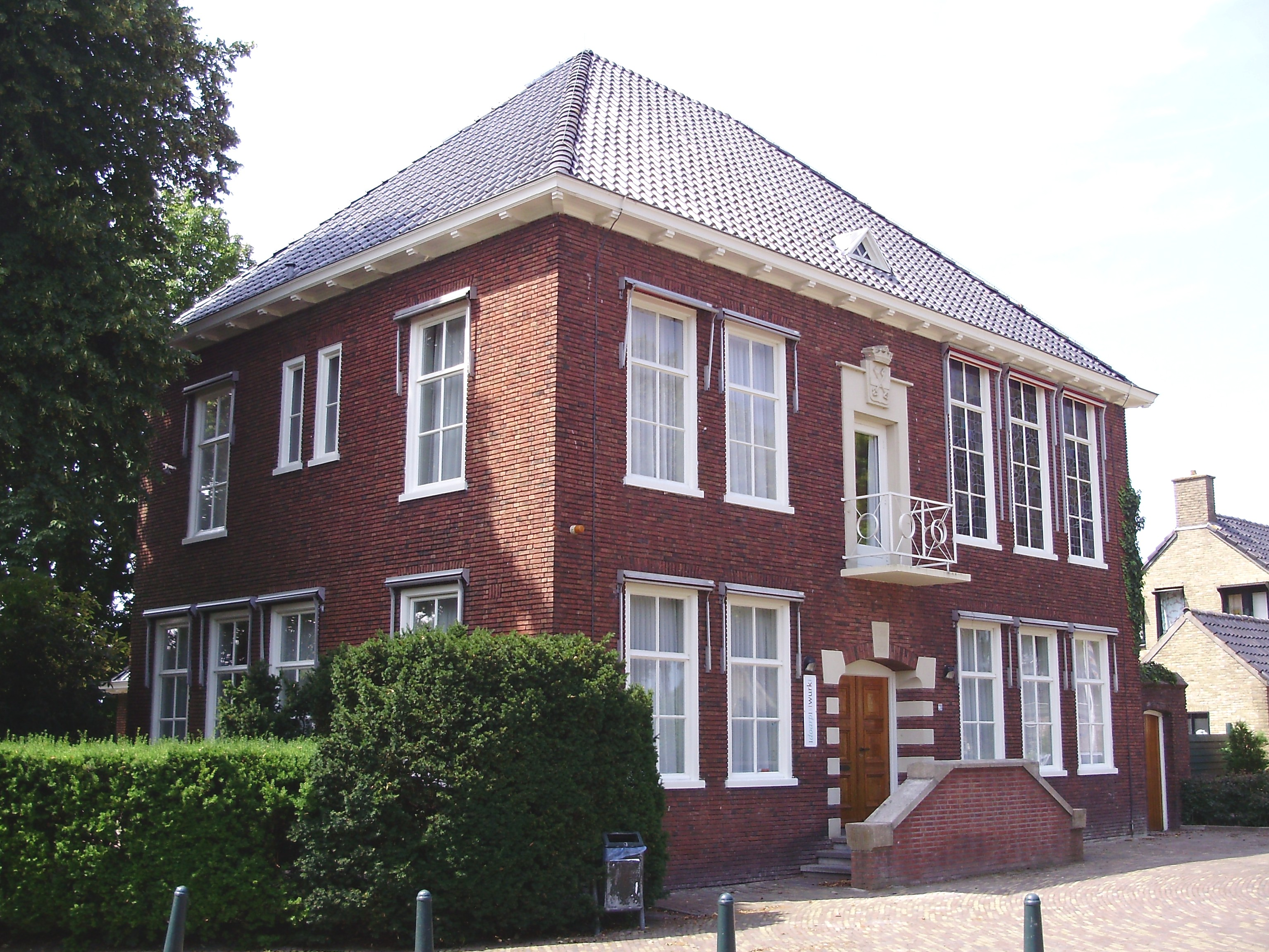
Former town hall of Rauwerdhem

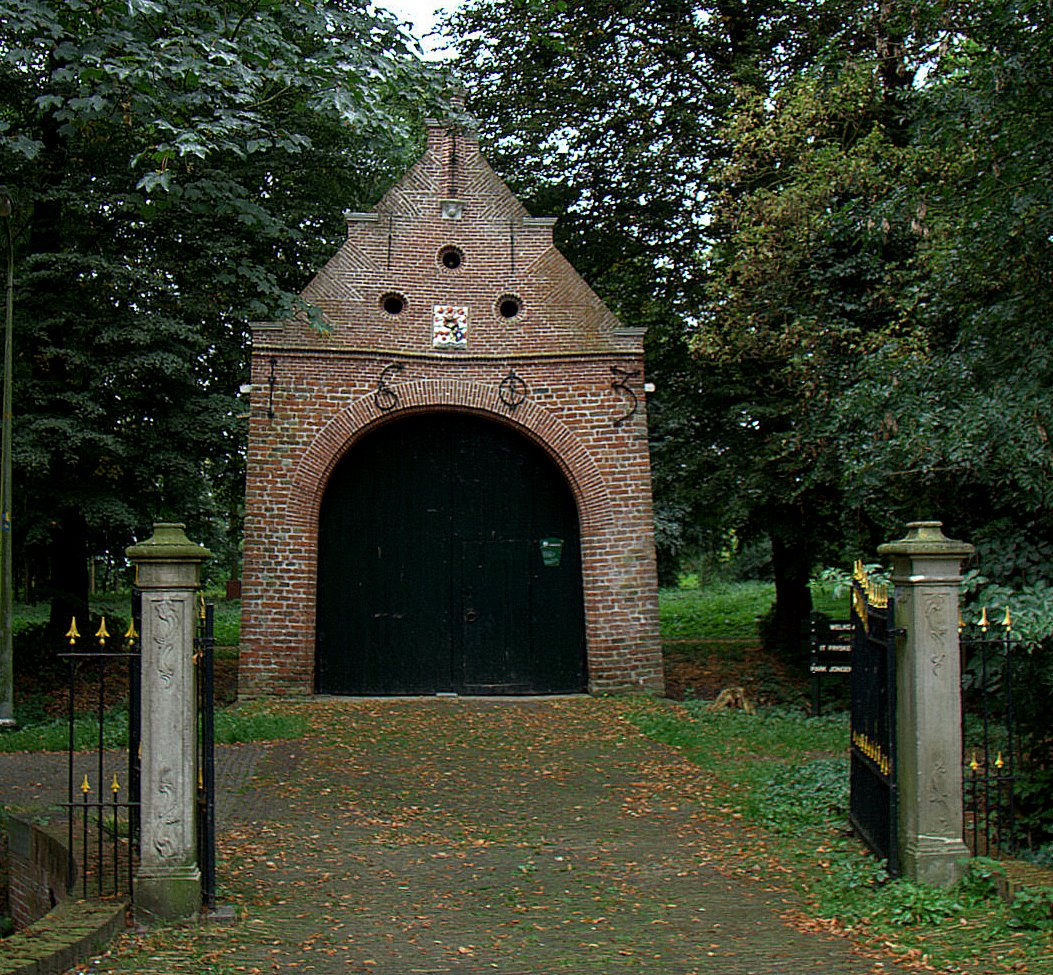
Gate of Jonhema State

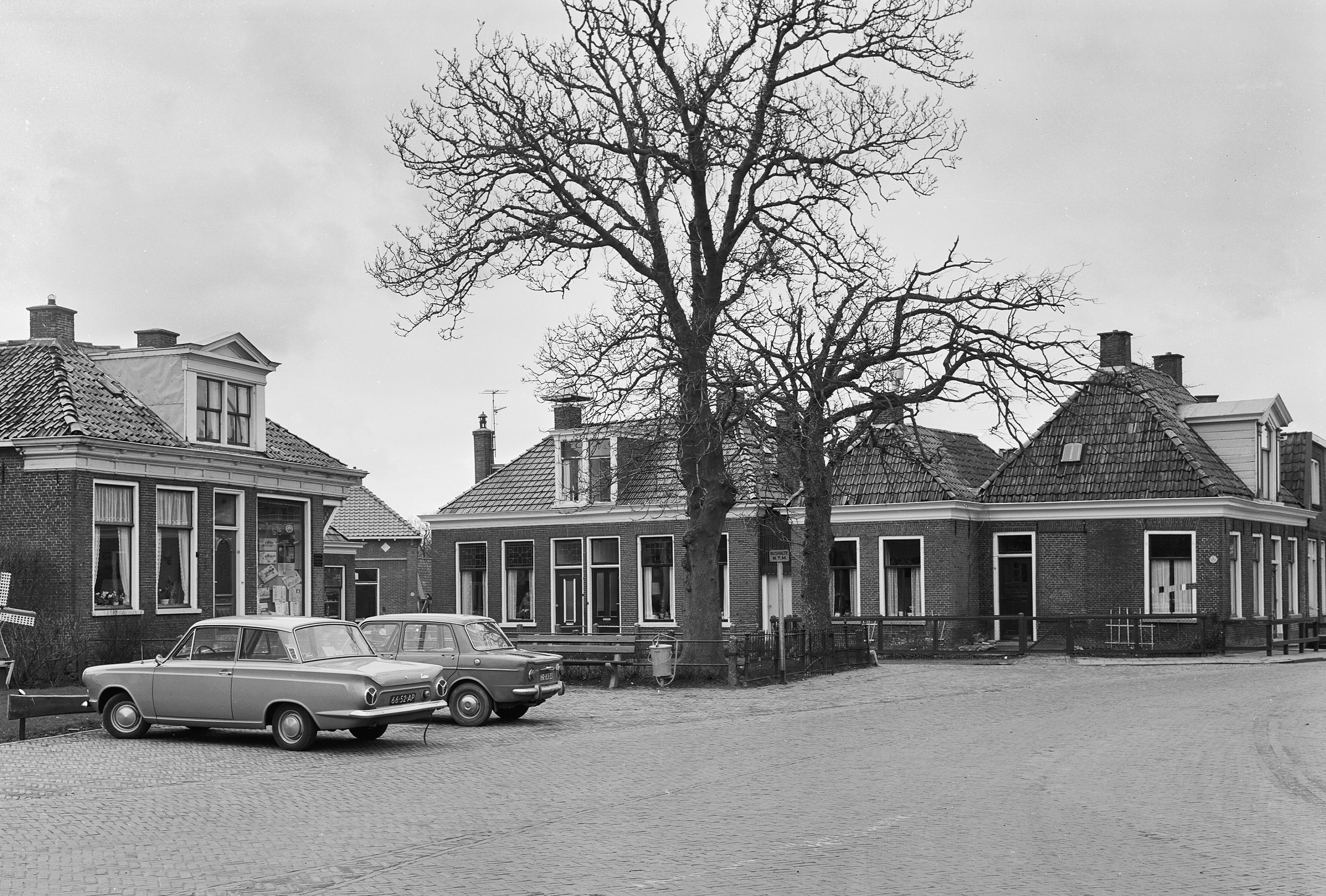
Houses in Raerd (1968)

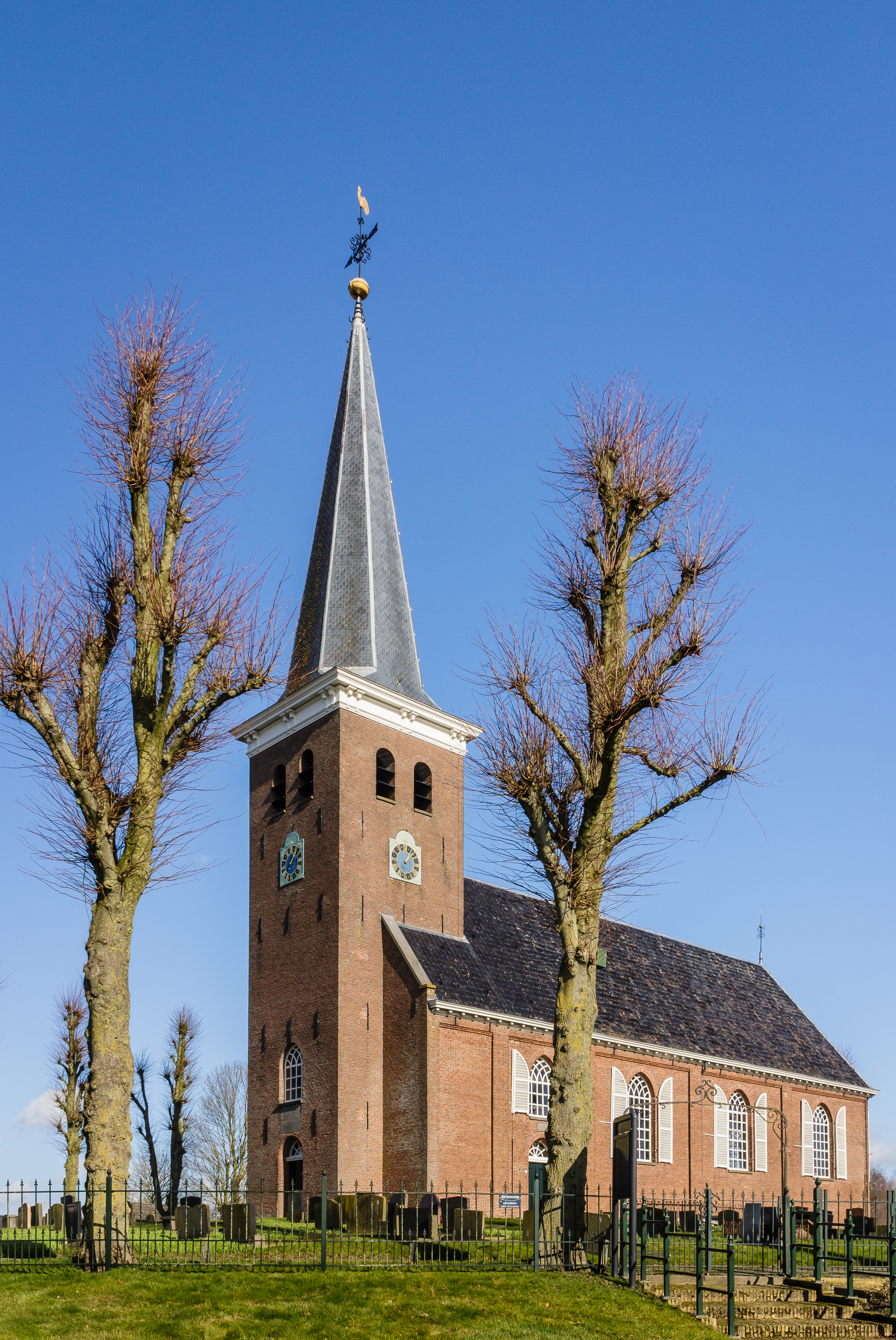
Laurentius Church (National Monument).
