= Protestant church of Grou =

Church in Grou, Netherlands

Coordinates: 53°05′51″N 5°50′27″E

Protestant church of Grou Saint Peter's church
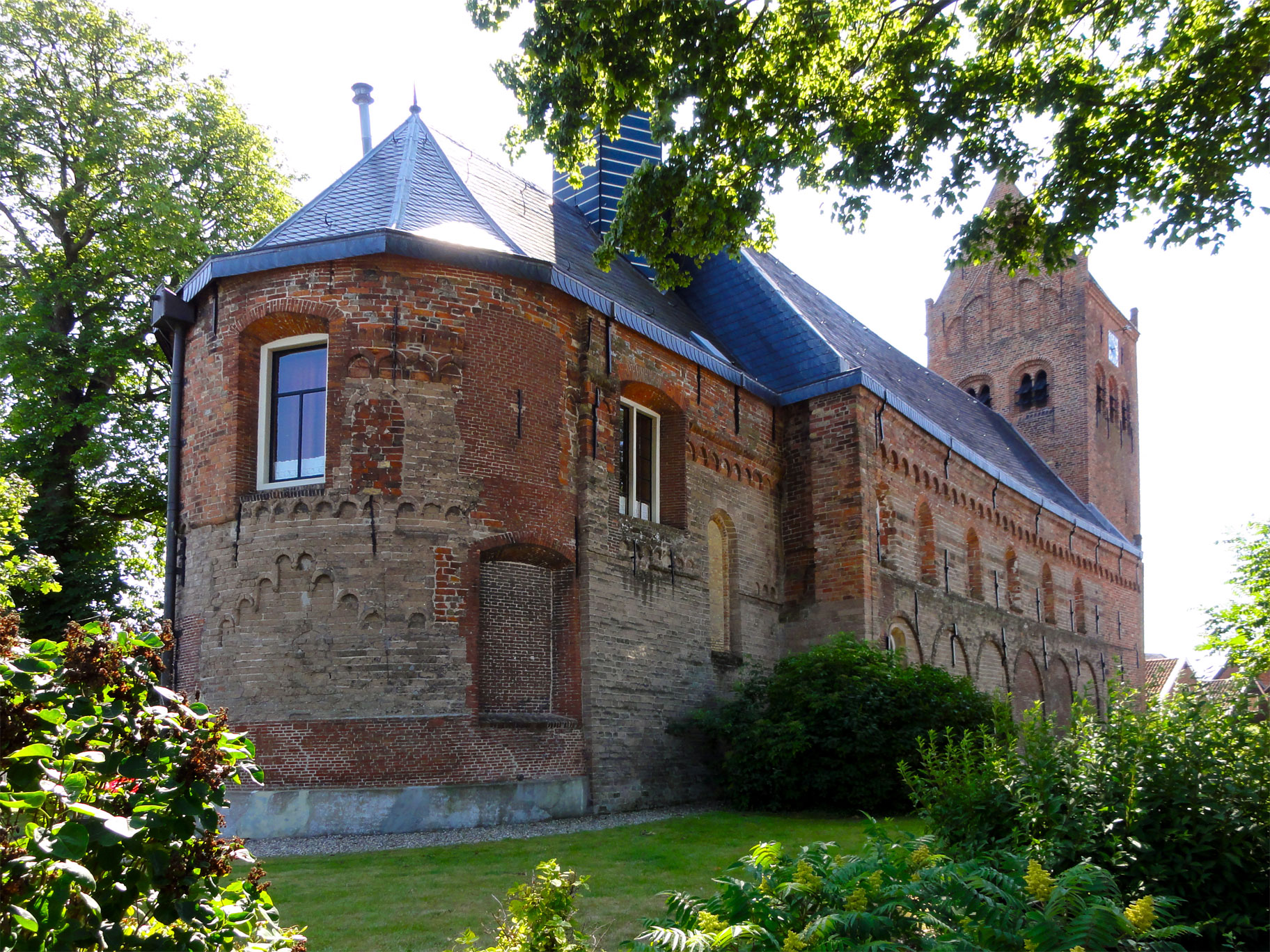
- Church of Grou
- Protestant church of Grou; Saint Peter's church

History
- Dedication: Before the Reformation, to Saint Peter

Specifications
- Materials: Tuffstone and Brick

The Protestant church of Grou or Saint Peter's church is a religious building in Grou, Netherlands, one of the many medieval churches in Friesland.

The Romanesque church was built in the first half of the 13th century out of tuffstone. Already in the 13th century the church was heightened. In the 15th century the church was lengthened to the west and heightened for the second time with Brick. The current tower dates from the early 15th century.

The monumental Pipe organ was built in 1853 by L. van Dam & Zn. from Leeuwarden. The church is located on the Kerkstraat 4 and was once a Roman Catholic church dedicated to Saint Peter but became a Protestant church after the Protestant Reformation. It is listed as a Rijksmonument, number 22894 and is rated with a very high historical value.
