= Nes, Heerenveen =

Nes
- Village
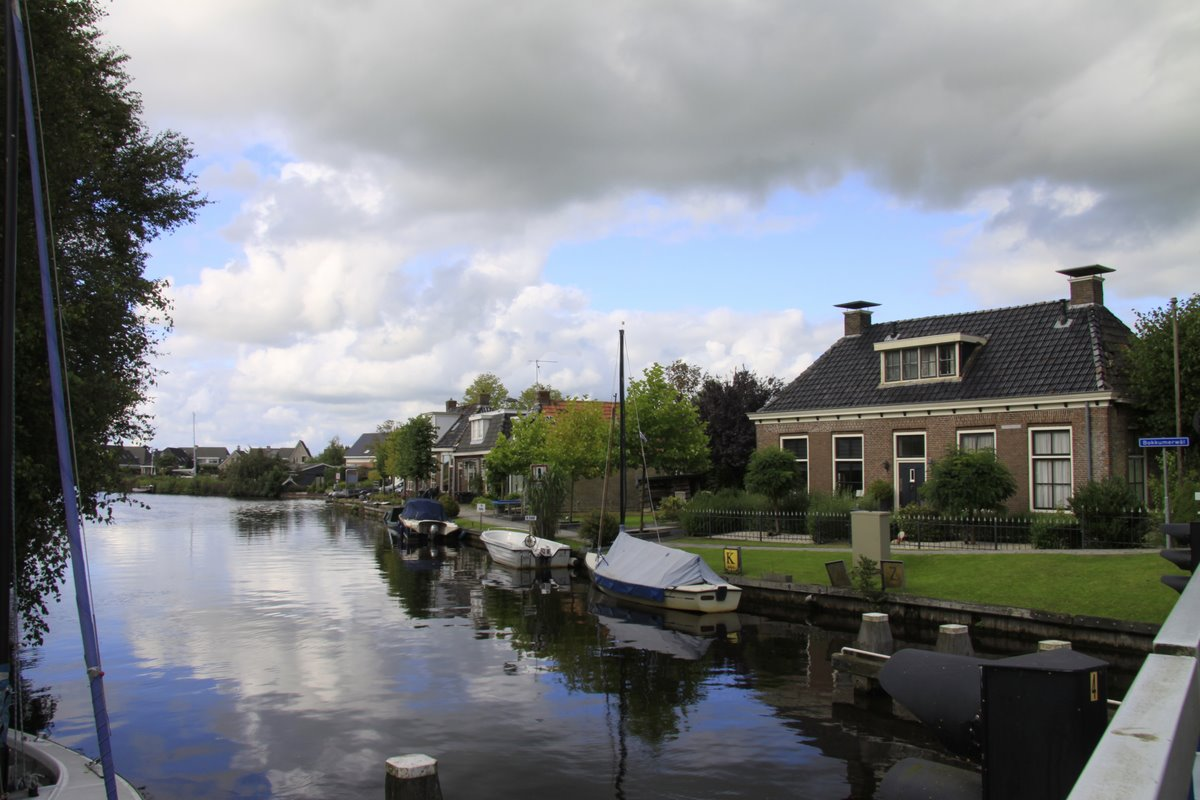

- Coat of arms

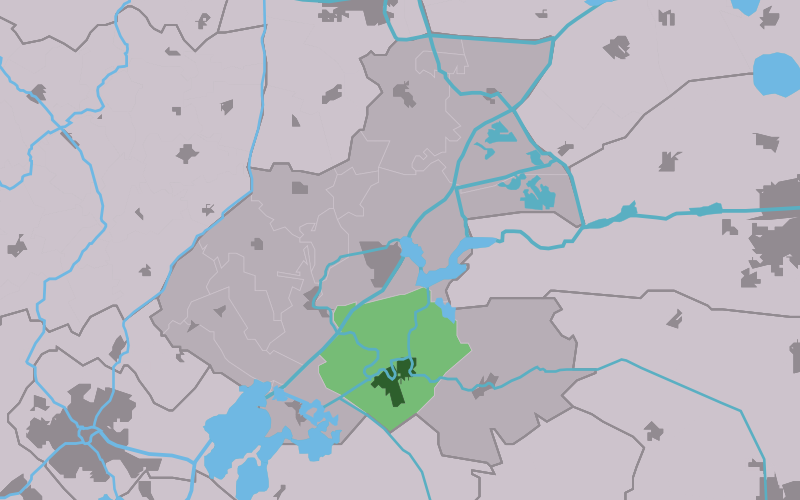
- Location in the former Boarnsterhim municipality

- Location in the Netherlands Nes (Netherlands)
- Coordinates: 53°3′N 5°50′E
- Country: Netherlands
- Province: Friesland
- Municipality: Heerenveen

Area
  - Total: 8.42 km^{2} (3.25 sq mi)
  - Land: 7.97 km^{2} (3.08 sq mi)
  - Water: 4.5 km^{2} (1.7 sq mi)
- Elevation: 0.6 m (2.0 ft)

Population (2014)
  - Total: 1,100
  - Density: 138/km^{2} (360/sq mi)
- Postcode: 8494
- Area code: 0566
- Website: www.akkrum.net

Nes (Dutch pronunciation: [nɛs]) is a Dutch village in the municipality of Heerenveen, Friesland. It is situated in the northern part of the country. Since the village is close to Akkrum, they usually speak about Akkrum-Nes.

== History ==
The mound, on which the belfry (Dutch: Klokkenstoel) stands, is a relic of the monastery Nesser (Nesker Konvent). The monastery was founded around 1200 by the Teutonic Order. The monastery had a lot of land in ownership and has been very important for both the village of Nes, as the extraction and management of the surrounding area. The monastery is at the beginning of the 17th century on decline, the church "St. Nicholas" however, lasted longer, but eventually the church was demolished because it was on decline. Around 1606 it was first talked about Nesserbuïen and from 1700 only one still spoke of Nes.

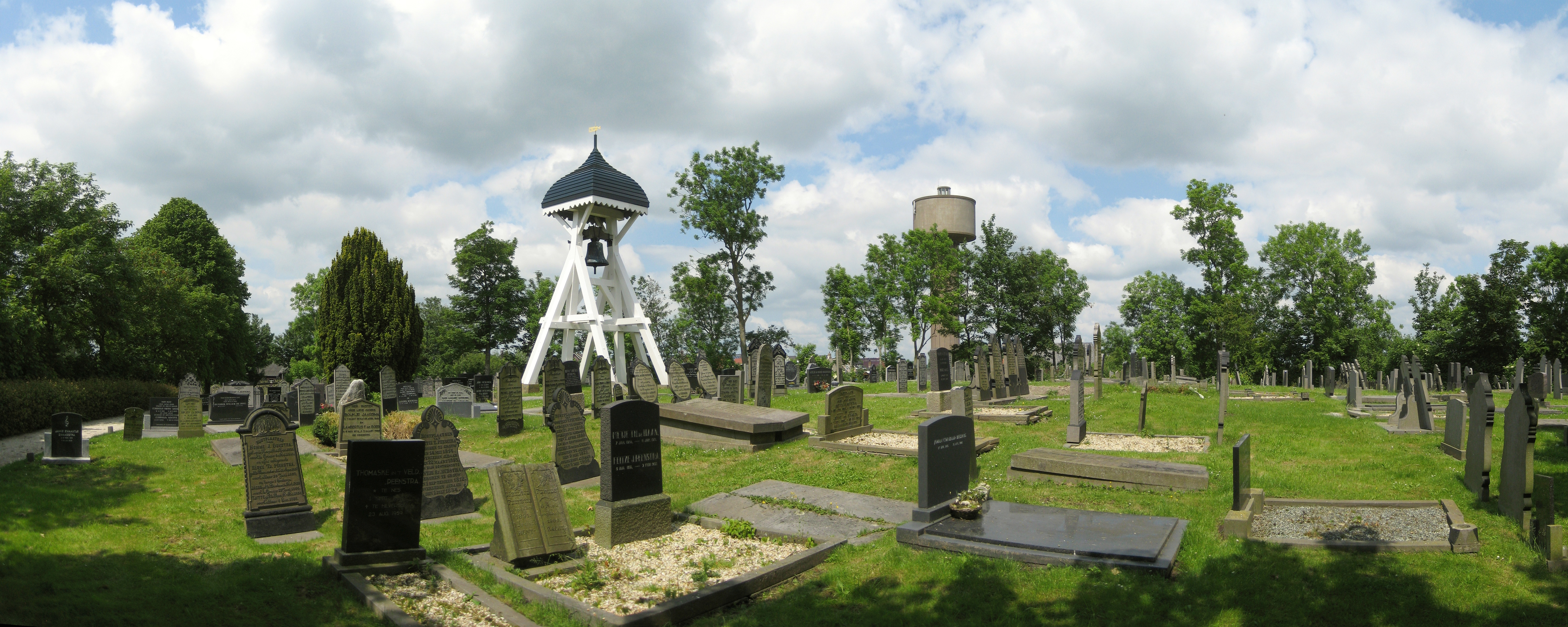
The graveyard and belfry in Nes in 2014, with in the background the Water Tower of Akkrum.

The old center of Nes is located on the corner of the waterways: The Boorne and Nesser Zijlroede. Until 1877 this was the site for, just south of the Sylsbrêge, the Neskersyl (lock) for centuries. The mound was originally much larger, but in the early 19th century, largely excavated. Since January 1989 the official name of the village is Nes. An aqueduct in the Boorne and a new waterway from the Boarne to the Nesser Zijlroede was realized in 1997. Through this realization arose between the old and new Boarne and the old core of Nes a peninsula. On this peninsula is a new district risen, Boarnstee, with more than 300 houses by the water. At present there is only a belfry on the graveyard mound.

== Governance ==
Until the municipal reorganization on January 1, 1984, Nes made part of the municipality lifted by Utingeradeel, then fell thirty years under Boornsterhem that, because it could never form a unity, decided to redistribute the areas. Since January 1, 2014 Nes is part of the municipality of Heerenveen.

== Sights ==
Nes is known not only as the starting point of the "Turfroute", but also for its other recreational activities. Nes is situated in a natural environment with both land and water landscapes. Walking and cycling opportunities are available for nature lovers, and facilities for everyday needs, sports and entertainment can be found within walking or cycling distance in Akkrum.

== Population ==
1999	2002	2004	2005	2006	2007	2008
199	575	890	1000	1071	1094	1106
2009	2011	2012	2013	2014	2015	
1110	1109	1113	N/A	1100		

== Notable residents ==
Foppe de Haan (1943), football coach
