= Aquaverium =

Building in Friesland, Netherlands

Coordinates: 53°5′54″N 5°49′17″E

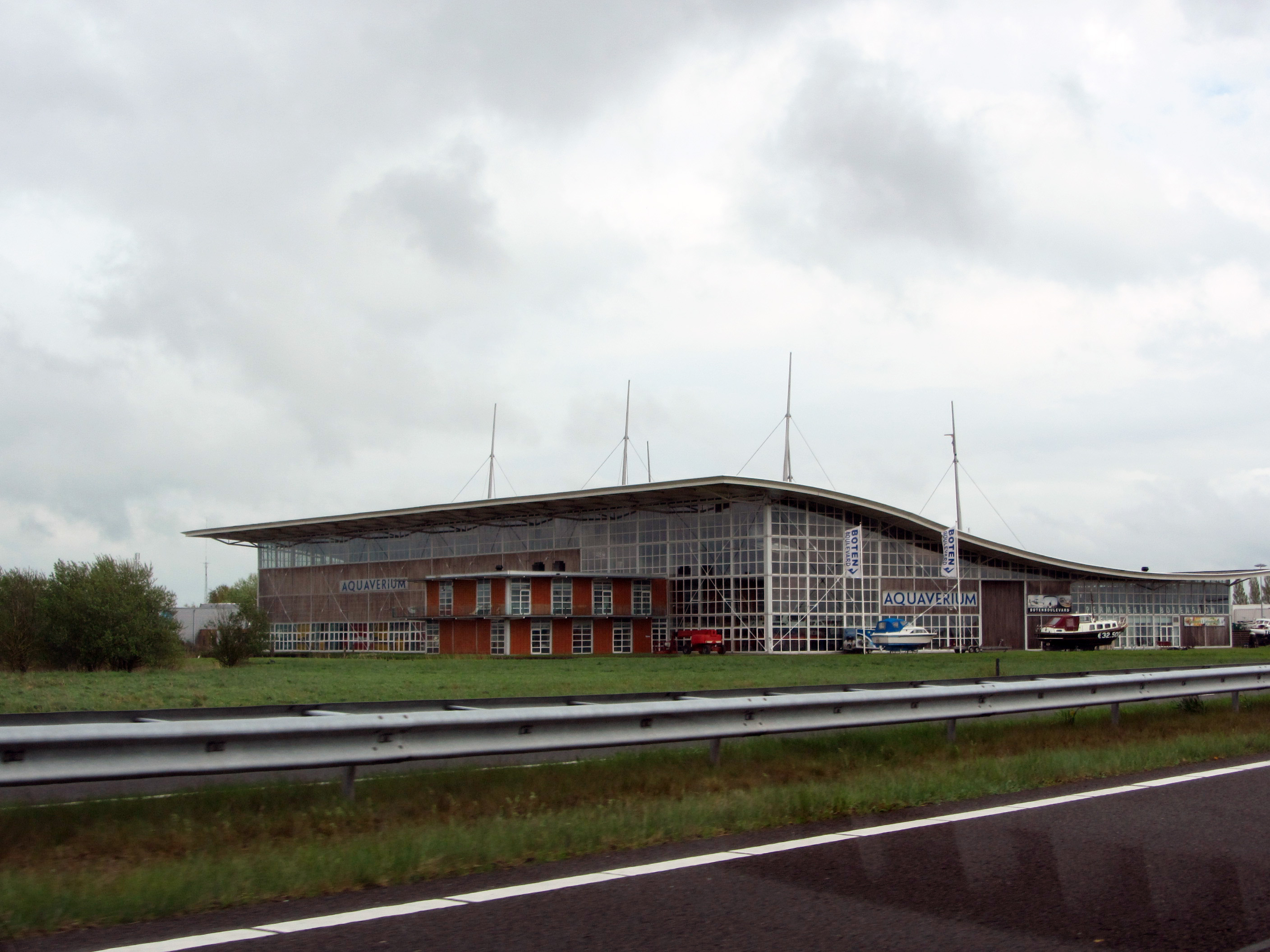
Aquaverium

The Aquaverium was a permanent Watersport Exhibition, located in Grou, Friesland. It offers 10.000 m² of floorspace to Watersports related companies for showing their products to the public. There is no entrance fee.
