= Warstiens =

- Village
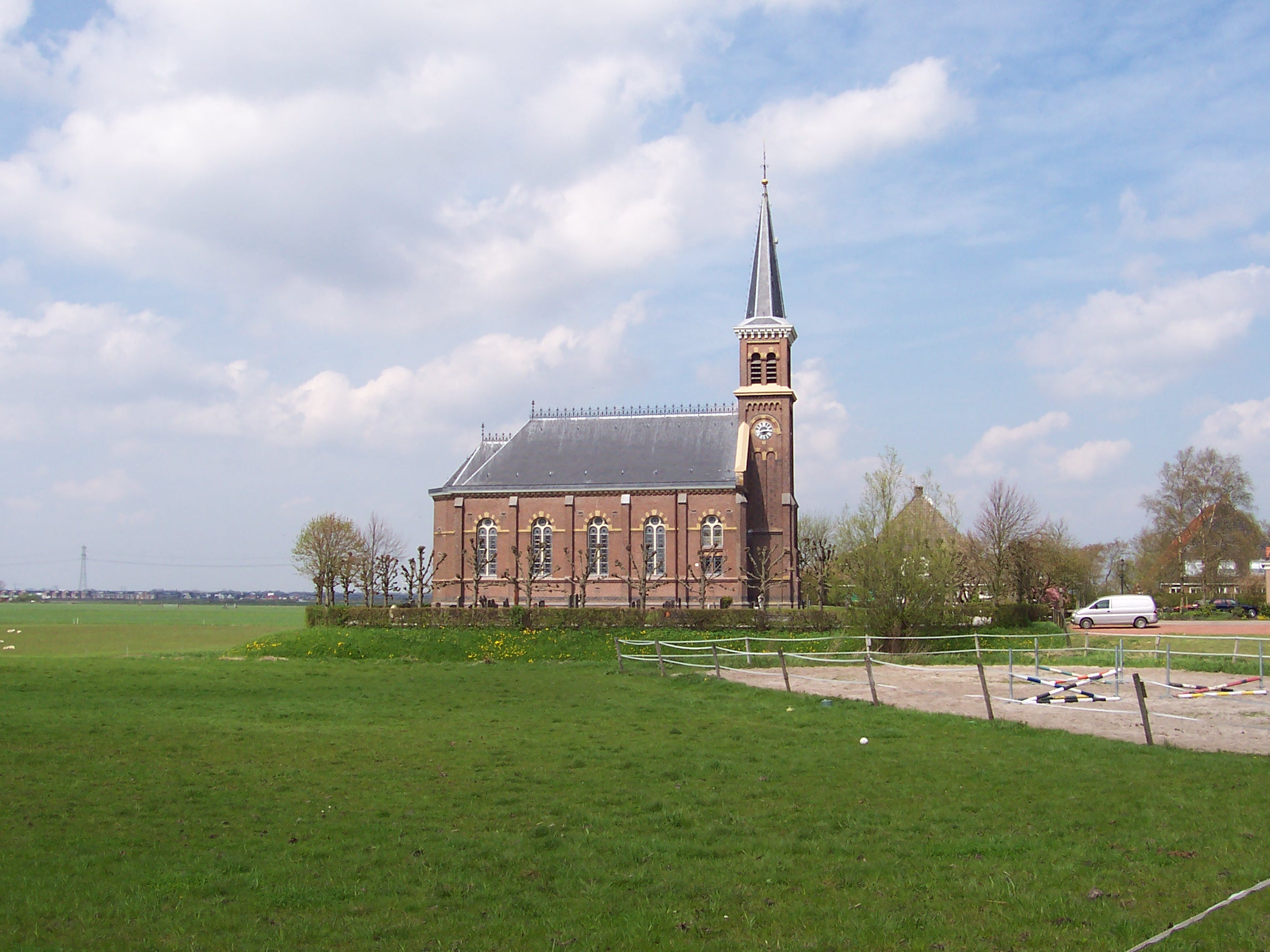
- Warstiens church

- Flag Coat of arms

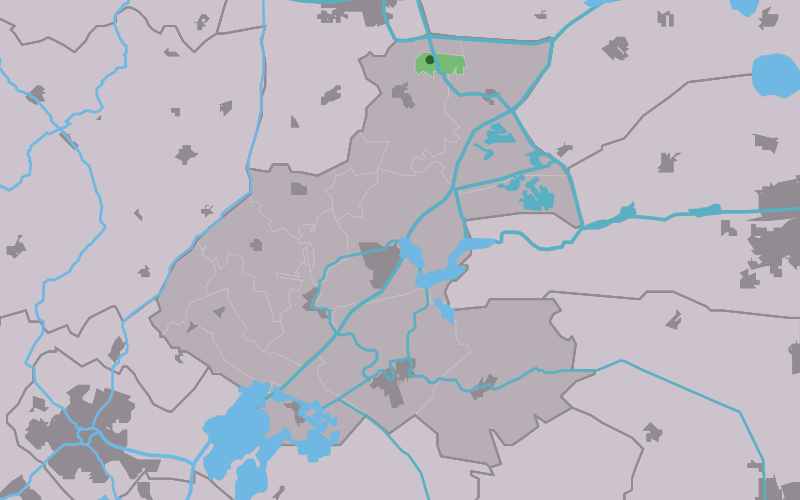
- Location in the former Boarnsterhim municipality

- Location in the Netherlands Warstiens (Netherlands)
- Country: Netherlands
- Province: Friesland
- Municipality: Leeuwarden

Area
  - Total: 2.71 km^{2} (1.05 sq mi)
- Elevation: 0.1 m (0.33 ft)

Population (2021)
  - Total: 30
  - Density: 11/km^{2} (29/sq mi)
- Time zone: UTC+1 (CET)
  - Summer (DST): UTC+2 (CEST)
- Postal code: 9004
- Dialing code: 058

Warstiens is a small village in Leeuwarden municipality in the province of Friesland, the Netherlands. It had a population of around 35 in January 2017.

== History ==
The village was first mentioned in 1477 as Wer-steens, and means "parcel of land of Steene (person)". In 1840, Warstiens was home to 27 people. In 1882, a new Dutch Reformed church was constructed in the village. The bell from 1252 of the old church is nowadays on display at the Rijksmuseum in Amsterdam. The church is used for service twice a month.

Before 2014, Warstiens was part of Boarnsterhim municipality and before 1984 it belonged to Idaarderadeel.

== Gallery ==
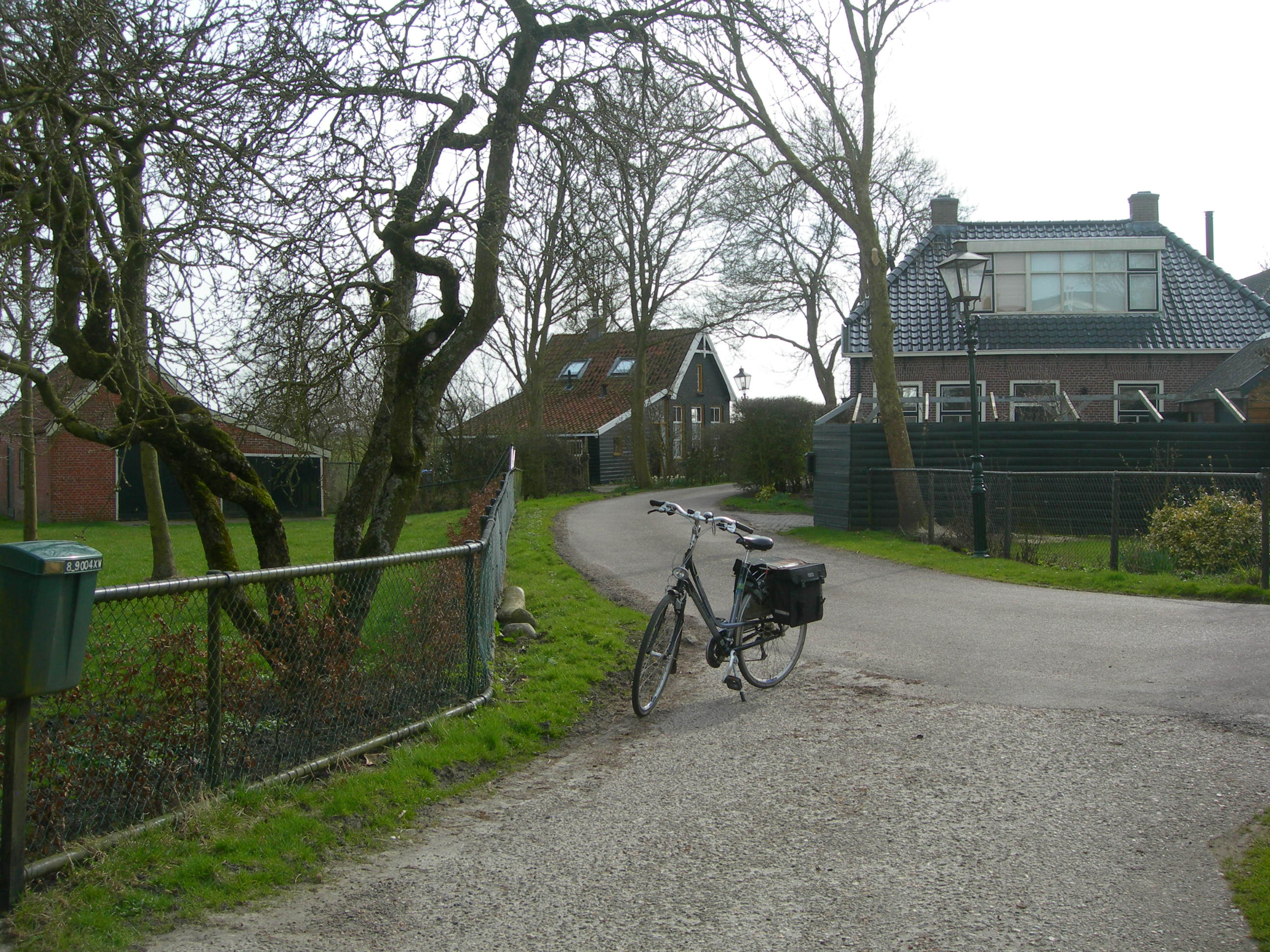
Village centre

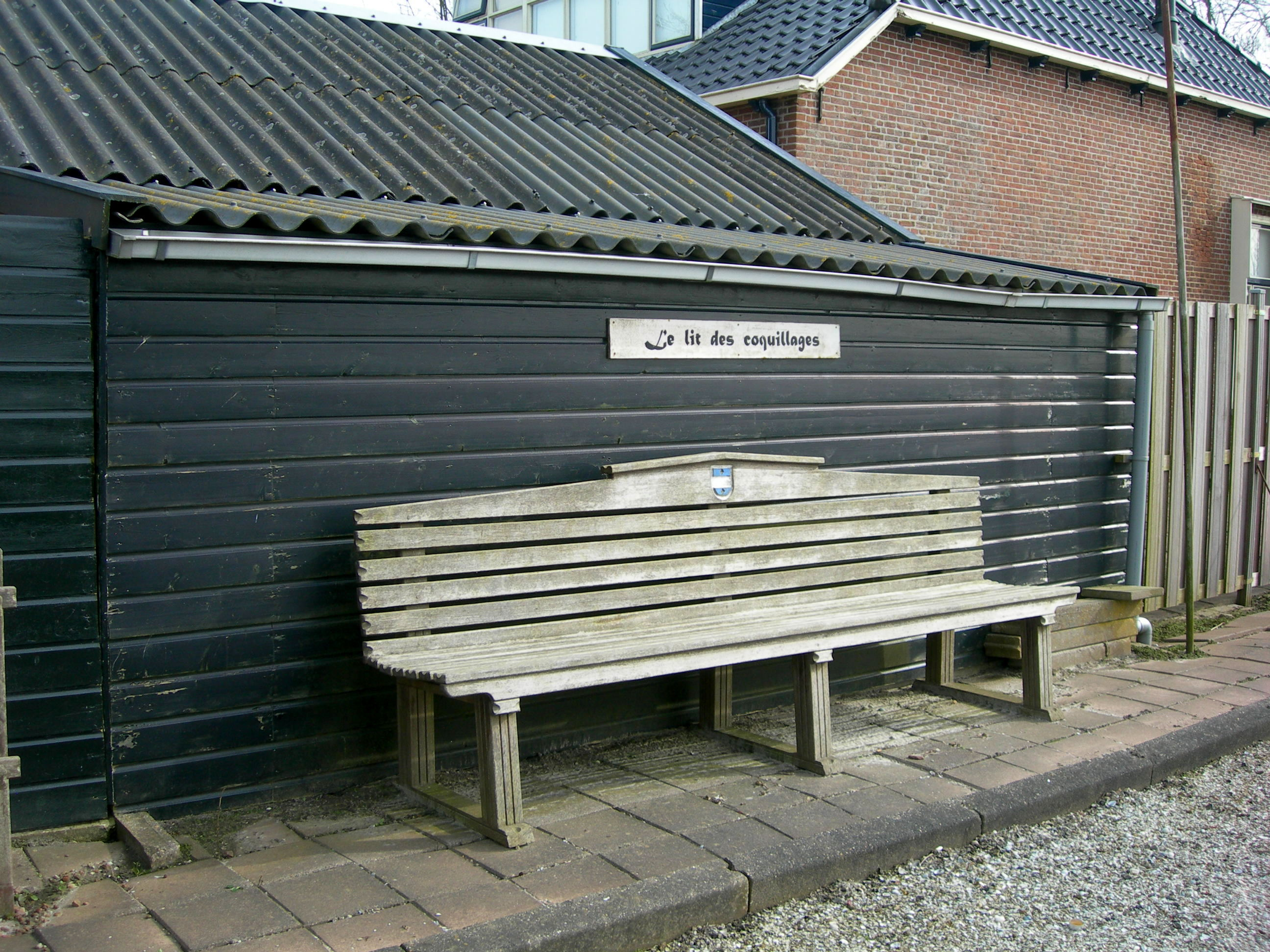
Bench Le lit des coquillages (The seashell bed)

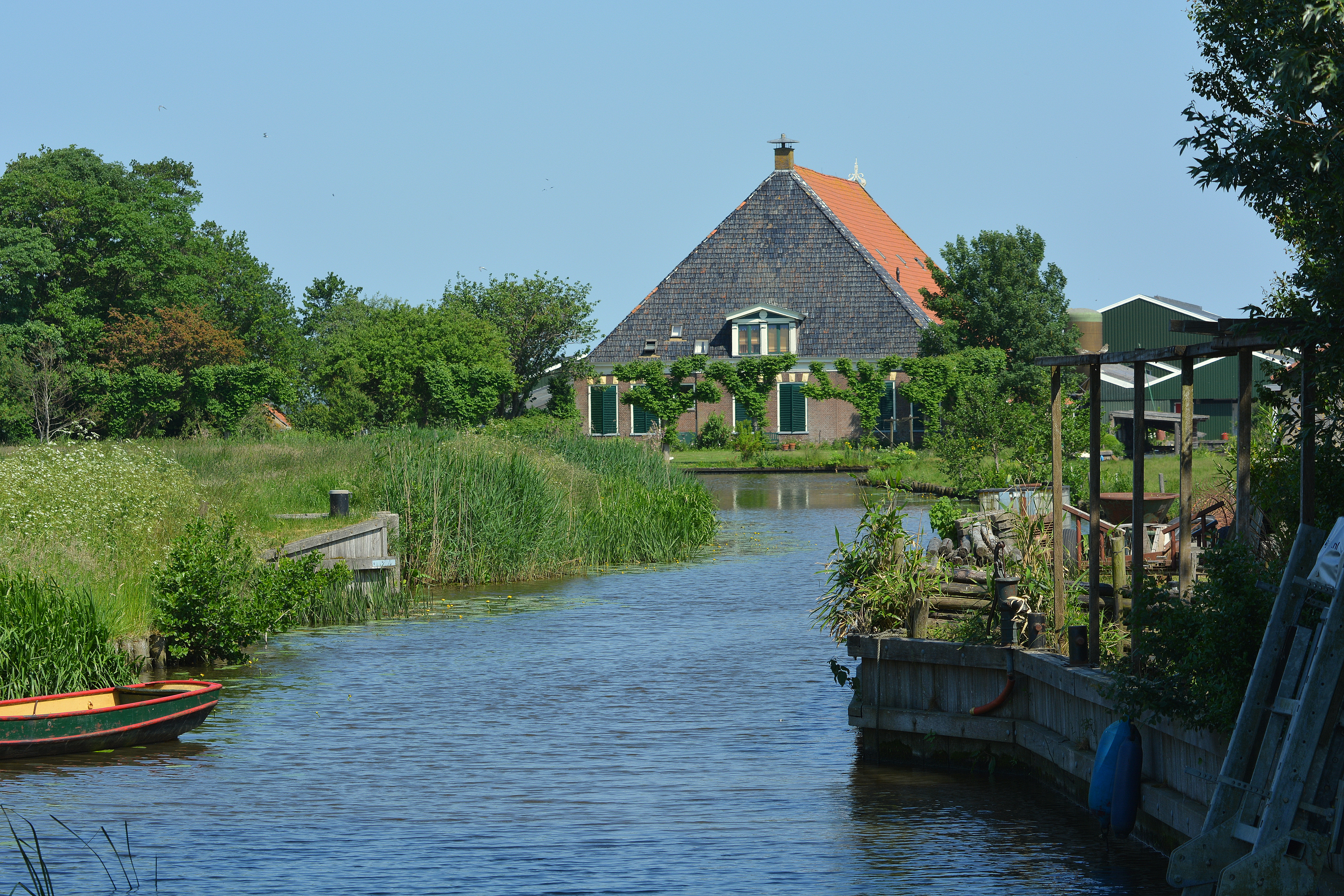
Canal view

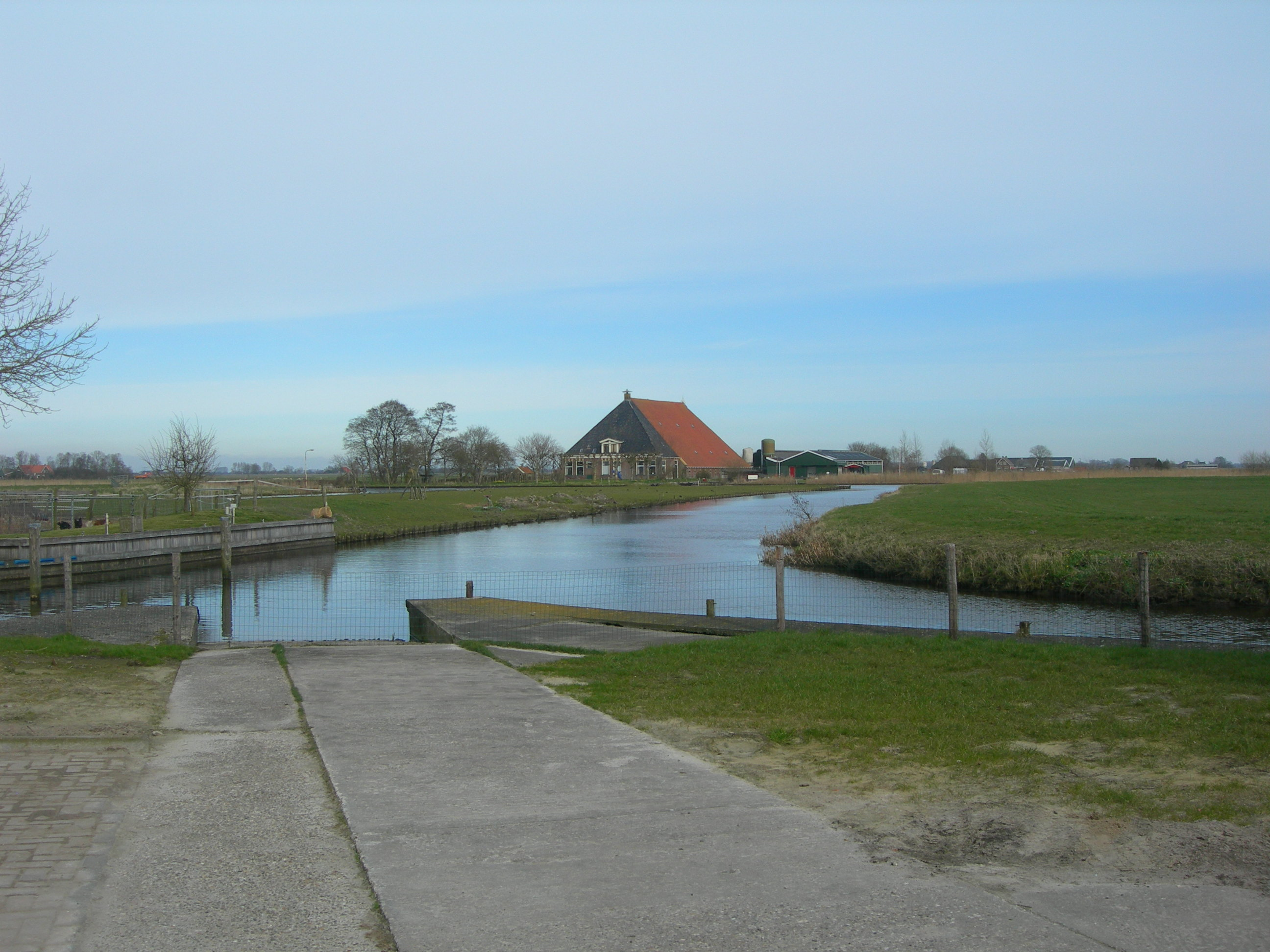
The harbour of Warstiens
