= Boarnsterhim =

Boarnsterhim Boornsterhem
- Former municipality
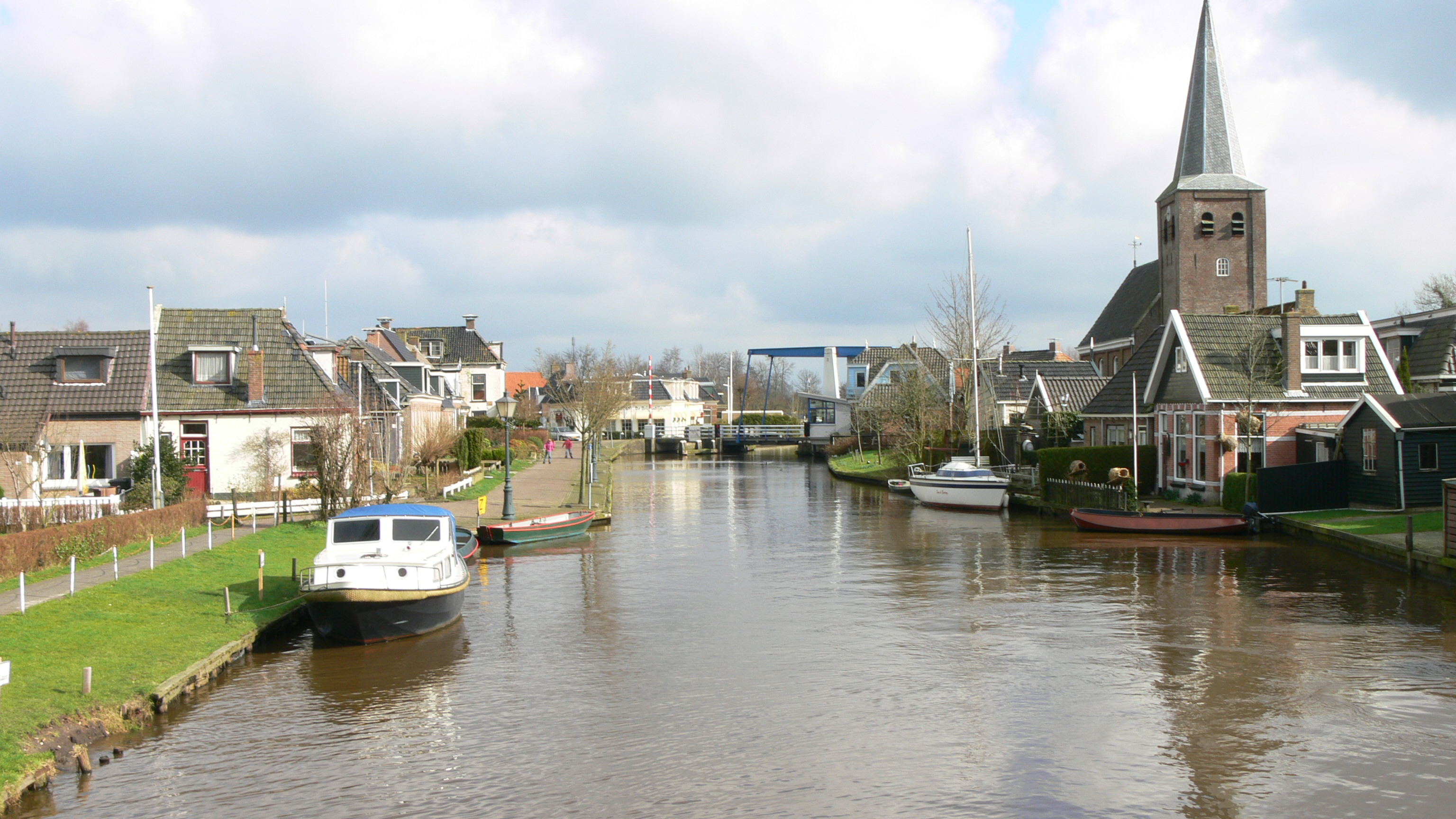
- Skyline of Warten

- Flag Coat of arms

- Location in Friesland
- Coordinates: 53°6′N 5°50′E
- Country: Netherlands
- Province: Friesland
- Established: 1 January 1984
- Dissolved: 1 January 2014

Area
  - Total: 168.58 km^{2} (65.09 sq mi)
  - Land: 151.54 km^{2} (58.51 sq mi)
  - Water: 17.04 km^{2} (6.58 sq mi)
- Elevation: 0 m (0 ft)

Population (November 2013)
  - Total: 19,482
  - Density: 129/km^{2} (330/sq mi)
- Time zone: UTC+1 (CET)
  - Summer (DST): UTC+2 (CEST)
- Postcode: Parts of 8000 and 9000 range
- Area code: 0515, 0566, 058

Boarnsterhim (West Frisian: [ˈbwãːstr̩ˌhɪm]; Dutch: Boornsterhem [ˈboːr(ə)nstərˌɦɛm]) was a municipality in the northern Netherlands. On 1 January 2014, the municipality was dissolved and its territory was split between four other municipalities: De Friese Meren, which was established that day, Leeuwarden, Heerenveen and Súdwest-Fryslân.

== Population centres ==
Akkrum, Aldeboarn (Oldeboorn), Dearsum (Deersum), Eagum (Aegum), Friens, Grou (Grouw), Idaerd (Idaard), Jirnsum (Irnsum), Nes, Poppenwier (Poppingawier), Raerd (Rauwerd), Reduzum (Roordahuizum), Sibrandabuorren (Sijbrandaburen), Terherne (Terhorne), Tersoal (Terzool), Warstiens, Warten (Wartena), Wergea (Warga).

(Dutch names)

== Transportation ==
=== Railway stations ===
- Akkrum
- Grou-Jirnsum

== Attractions ==
- Aquaverium
