= Idaerd =

Idaard Idaerd
- Village
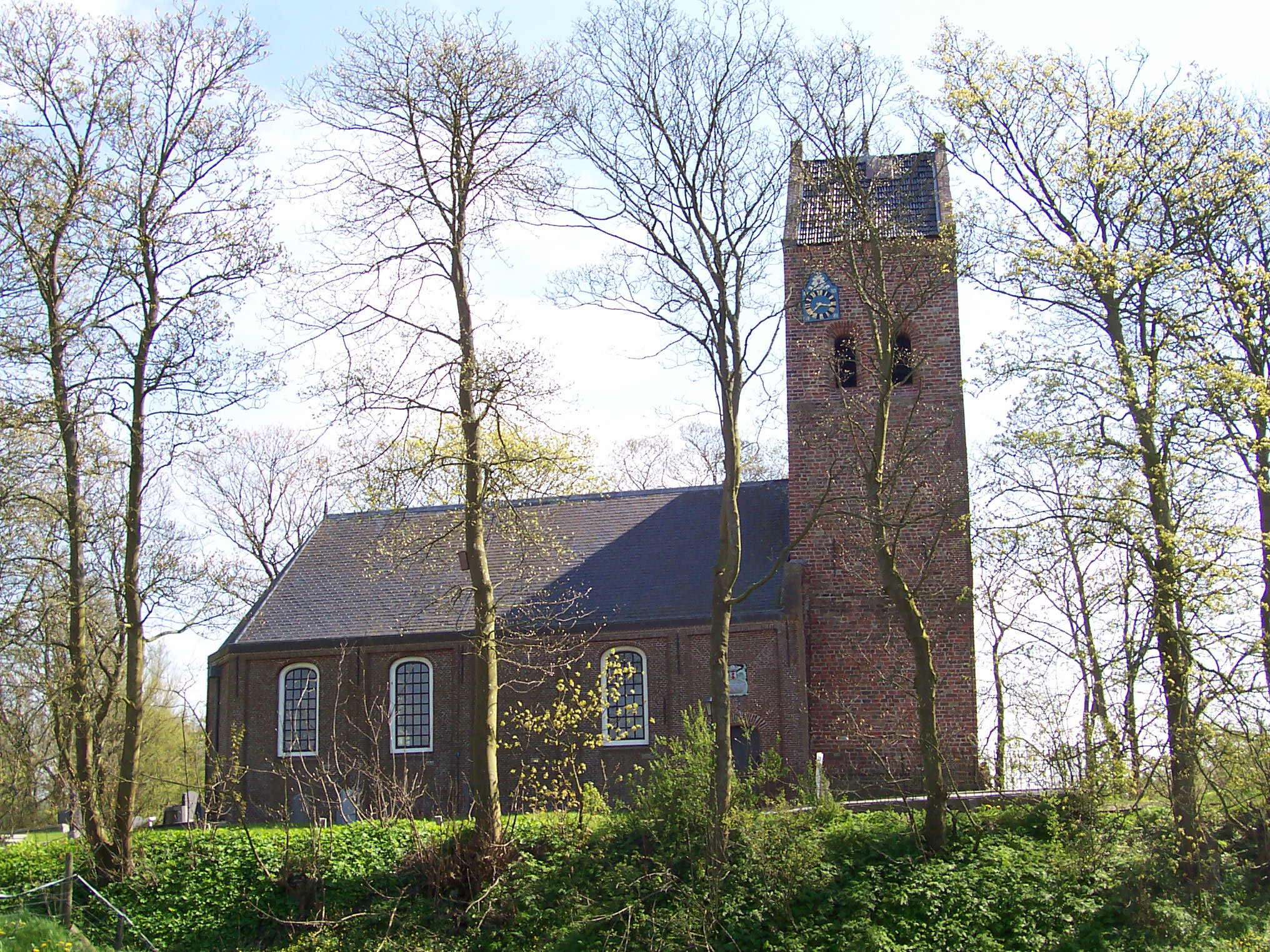
- Idaard Church

- Flag Coat of arms

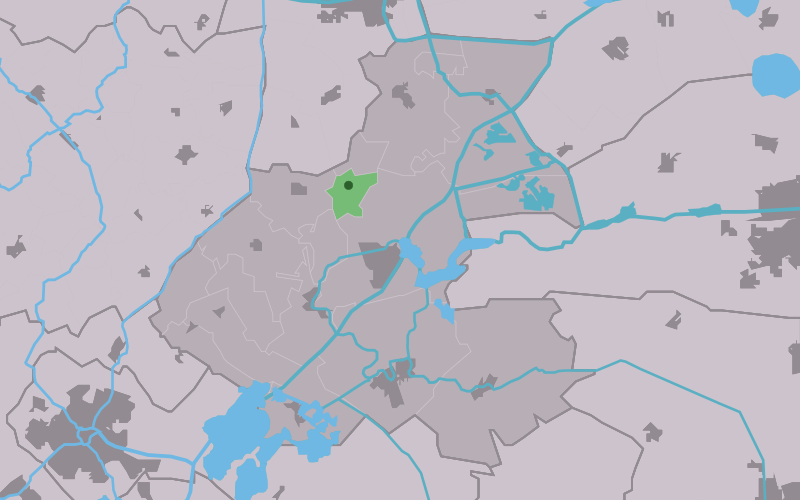
- Location in the former Boarnsterhim municipality

- Location in the Netherlands Idaard (Netherlands)
- Country: Netherlands
- Province: Friesland
- Municipality: Leeuwarden

Area
  - Total: 1.96 km^{2} (0.76 sq mi)
- Elevation: 0.3 m (0.98 ft)

Population (2021)
  - Total: 80
  - Density: 41/km^{2} (110/sq mi)
- Time zone: UTC+1 (CET)
  - Summer (DST): UTC+2 (CEST)
- Postal code: 9007
- Dialing code: 0566

Idaerd (Dutch: Idaard) is a village in the municipality of Leeuwarden in the province of Friesland, Netherlands. It had a population of around 80 in January 2017.

== History ==
The village was first mentioned in 944 as Edenwerfa. The etymology is unclear. The tower of the Dutch Reformed church dates from the 15th century; however, the nave is from 1774. In 1840, Ideard was home to 86 people.

Before 2014, Idaerd was part of the municipality of Boarnsterhim, and before 1984 it belonged to Idaarderadeel. Boarnsterhim was dissolved, and its territory was split among four other municipalities: De Fryske Marren, which was established the same day; Leeuwarden; Heerenveen; and Súdwest-Fryslân.

== Gallery ==
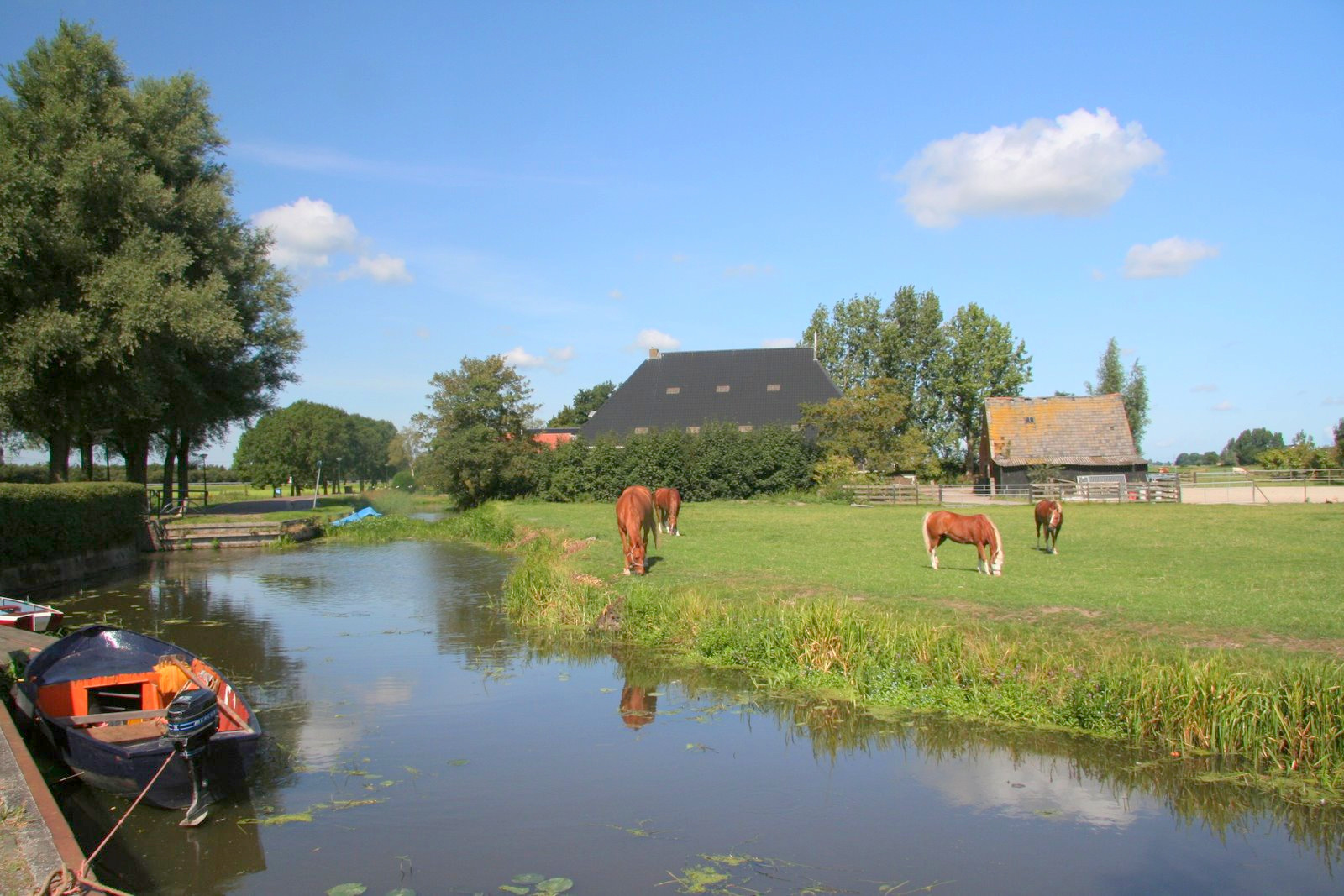
Landscape near Ideard

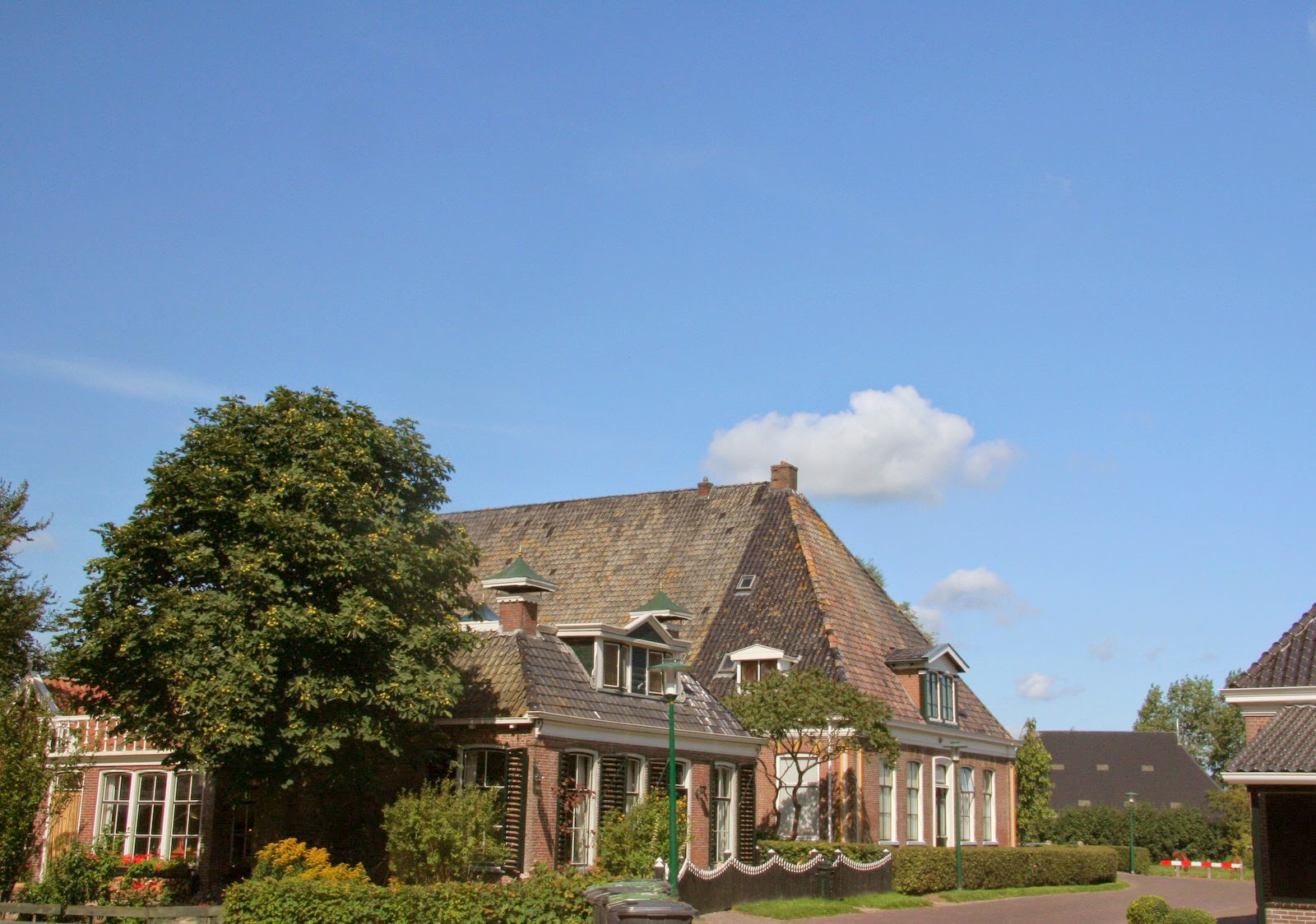
Farm in Ideard
