= Friens =

- Village
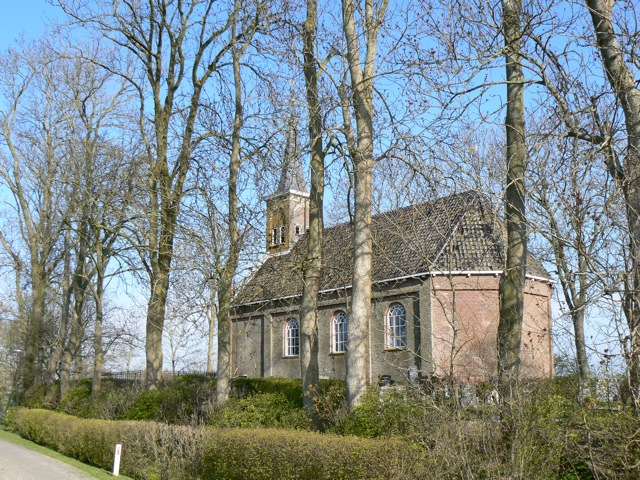
- Friens Church

- Flag Coat of arms

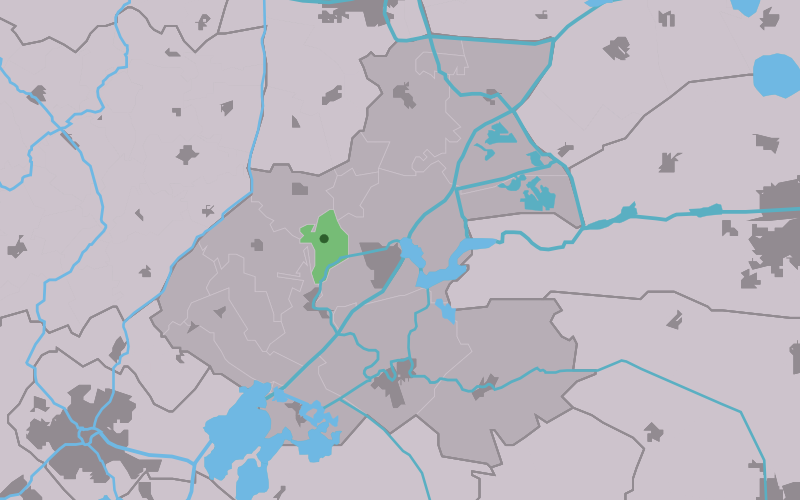
- Location in the former Boarnsterhim municipality

- Location in the Netherlands Friens (Netherlands)
- Country: Netherlands
- Province: Friesland
- Municipality: Leeuwarden

Area
  - Total: 3.17 km^{2} (1.22 sq mi)
- Elevation: 0.2 m (0.66 ft)

Population (2021)
  - Total: 90
  - Density: 28/km^{2} (74/sq mi)
- Time zone: UTC+1 (CET)
  - Summer (DST): UTC+2 (CEST)
- Postal code: 9009
- Dialing code: 0566

Friens is a village in the municipality Leeuwarden in the province of Friesland, the Netherlands. It had a population of around 80 in January 2017.

== History ==
The village was first mentioned in the 13th century Frenigge, and means "settlement of the people of Frana (person / representative of the Count)". The Utisma family had possessions in Friens in 1410. Before 1543, the stins Beslinga State was built. In 1828, it is owned by Baron van Sytzama who replaced the stins with a larger manor house. Van Sytzama died in a traffic accident in 1843, and there were no buyers for the estate, therefore, it was demolished in 1849.

There has been a church in Friens since the 13th century. The current Dutch Reformed Church 1795. It was altered in 1886, but restored to its original form in 1989. The tower dates from 1906. In 1840, Friens was home to 137 people.

Before 2014, Friens was part of Boarnsterhim municipality and before 1984 it belonged to Idaarderadeel.
