= Sibrandabuorren =

Sijbrandaburen Sibrandabuorren
- Village
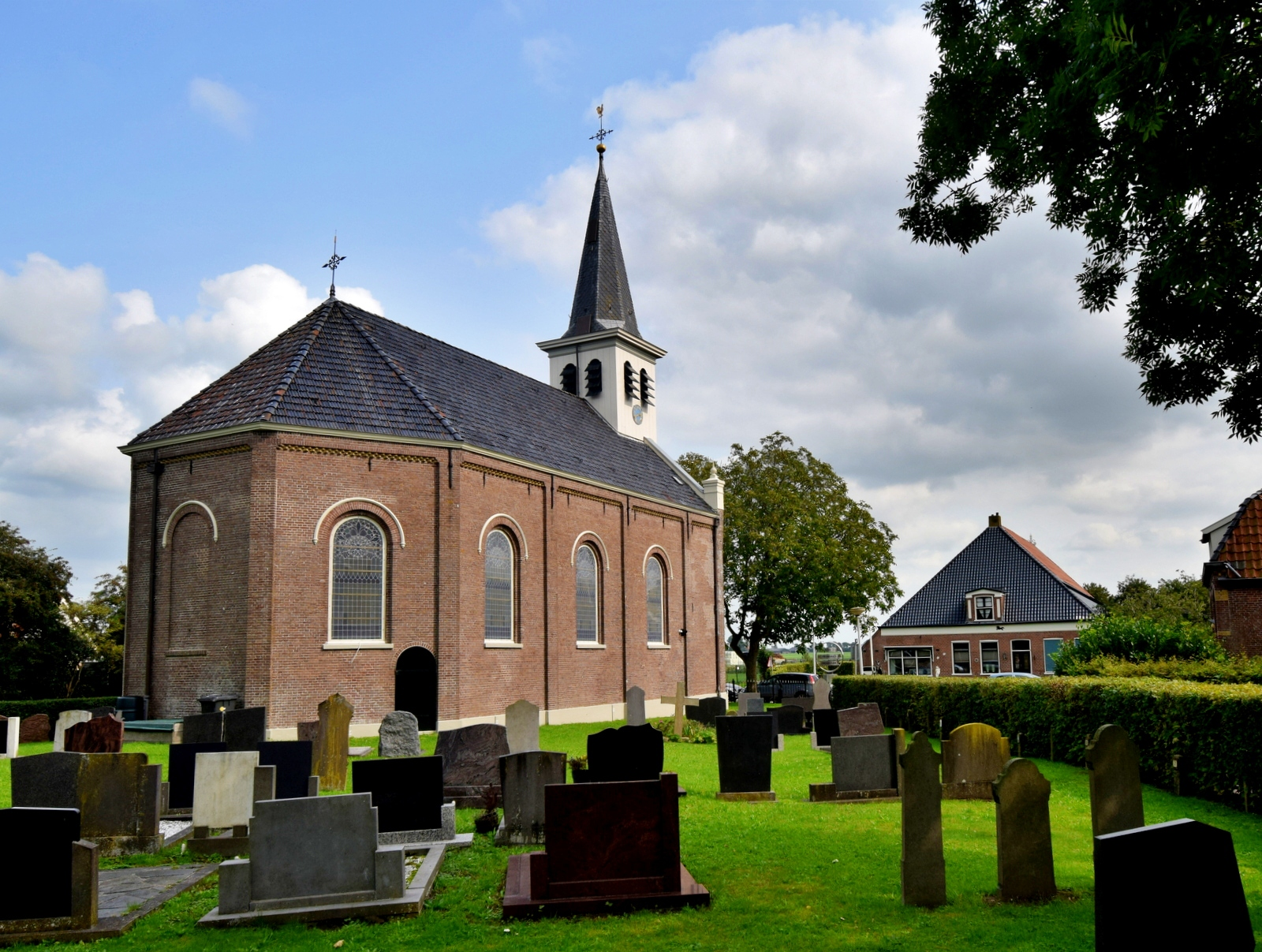

- Flag Coat of arms

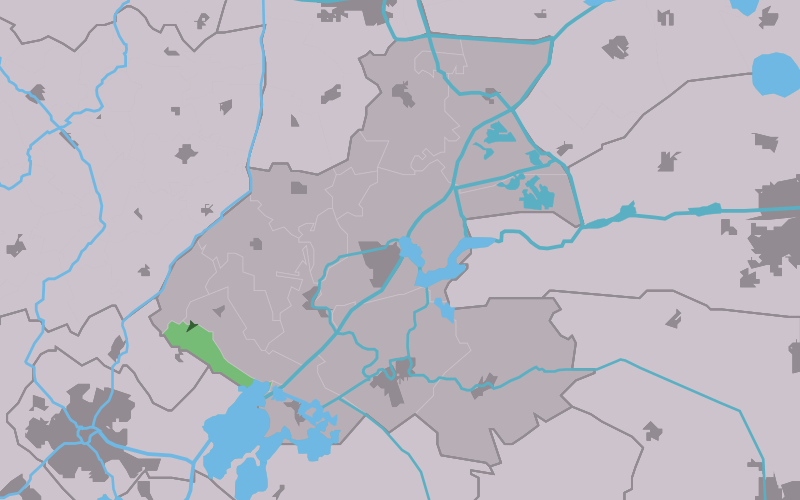
- Location in the former Boarnsterhim municipality

- Location in the Netherlands Sijbrandaburen (Netherlands)
- Country: Netherlands
- Province: Friesland
- Municipality: Súdwest-Fryslân

Area
  - Total: 3.99 km^{2} (1.54 sq mi)
- Elevation: 0.0 m (0 ft)

Population (2021)
  - Total: 355
  - Density: 89.0/km^{2} (230/sq mi)
- Time zone: UTC+1 (CET)
  - Summer (DST): UTC+2 (CEST)
- Postal code: 8647
- Dialing code: 0515

Sibrandabuorren (Dutch: Sijbrandaburen [ˌsɛibrɑndaːˈbyːrə(n)]) is a village in Súdwest-Fryslân municipality in the province of Friesland, the Netherlands. It had a population of around 365 in January 2017.

== History ==
The village was first mentioned in 1333 as "Zibrandus curatus in Zibrandaburghe", and means neighbourhood of Sibrand (person). Sibrandabuorren is a terp (artificial living hill) village from the middle ages located on the eastern side of the former Middelzee.

The Dutch Reformed church was built in 1872 as a replacement of a medieval church.

Sibrandabuorren was home to 155 people in 1840. During the 19th century, it extended into a linear settlement along the roads. In 1891, a dairy factory opened and remained in operation until 1975. The building is nowadays used by a stainless steel factory. Before 2011, the village was part of the Boarnsterhim municipality and before 1984 it belonged to Rauwerdhem municipality.
