= Grou =

Grou Grouw
- Village
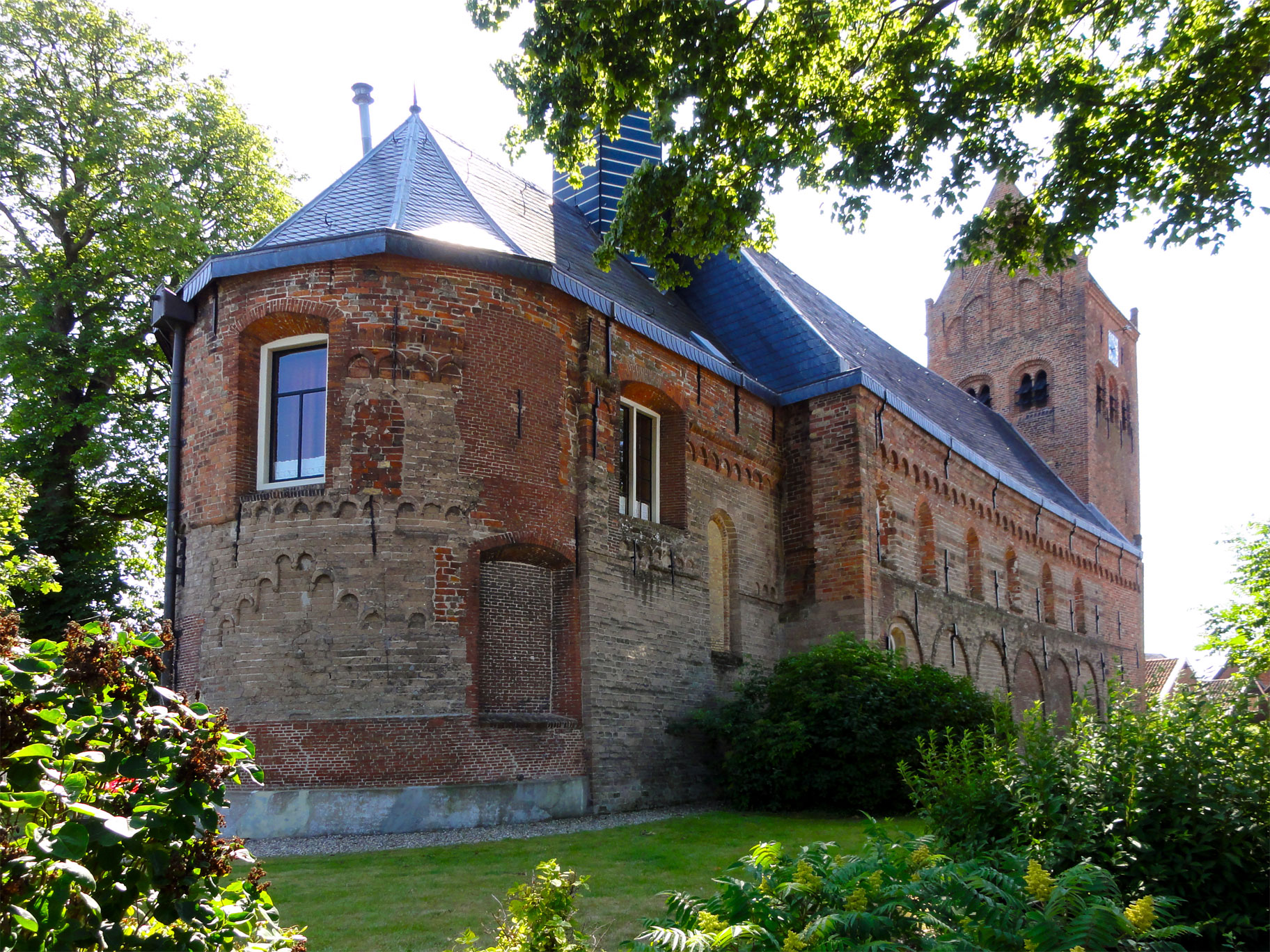
- St Peter's Church

- Flag Coat of arms

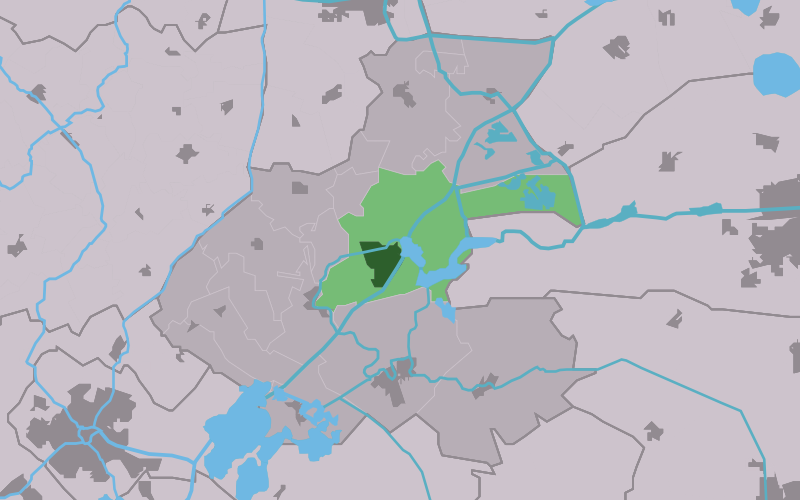
- Location in the former Boarnsterhim municipality

- Location in the Netherlands Grou (Netherlands)
- Country: Netherlands
- Province: Friesland
- Municipality: (Leeuwarden) Leeuwardeniadeel

Population (2017)
  - Total: 5,655
- Time zone: UTC+1 (CET)
  - Summer (DST): UTC+2 (CEST)
- Postal code: 9000-01
- Telephone area: 0566

Grou (Dutch: Grouw) is a town in the province Friesland of the Netherlands and had around 5655 citizens in January 2017. Since 2014 Grou is part of the municipality of Leeuwarden.

The town is located on the Pikmeer lake and the Prinses Margriet Canal. Heineken operated a distribution centre for Friesland in Grou for 25 years until 2004.

It used to be the capital of the municipality of Idaarderadeel before the reorganization of municipalities in 1984, and capital of the municipalities of Boarnsterhim and Leeuwardeniadeel until 2014.

While the rest of the Netherlands celebrates Sinterklaas (Saint Nicholas) on December 5, Grou instead celebrates a unique local variation of this children's holiday known as Sint-Piter on February 21. In local lore Sint Piter is a distinct character separate from Saint Nicholas, and was historically known as the patron saint for local fishermen.

A nickname for the town is Tsiisferdûnsers, meaning cheese dancers, from a story where a fiddler was paid with cheese at a village dance.

== Transport ==
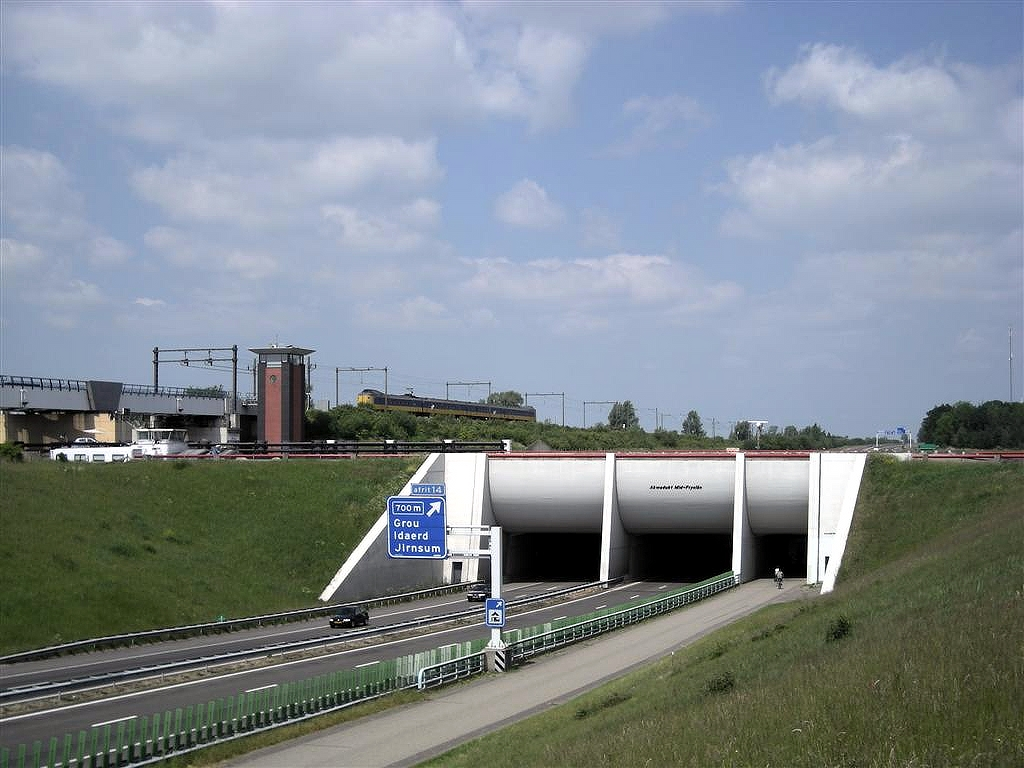
A32 underpass of the Prinses Margriet Canal

The town is located at an exit on the A32 motorway. There is a ferry across the canal called Veerpont de Burd that connects the de Burd island. The Grou-Jirnsum railway station is on the Staatslijn A (Arnhem - Leeuwarden) line.

== Population ==
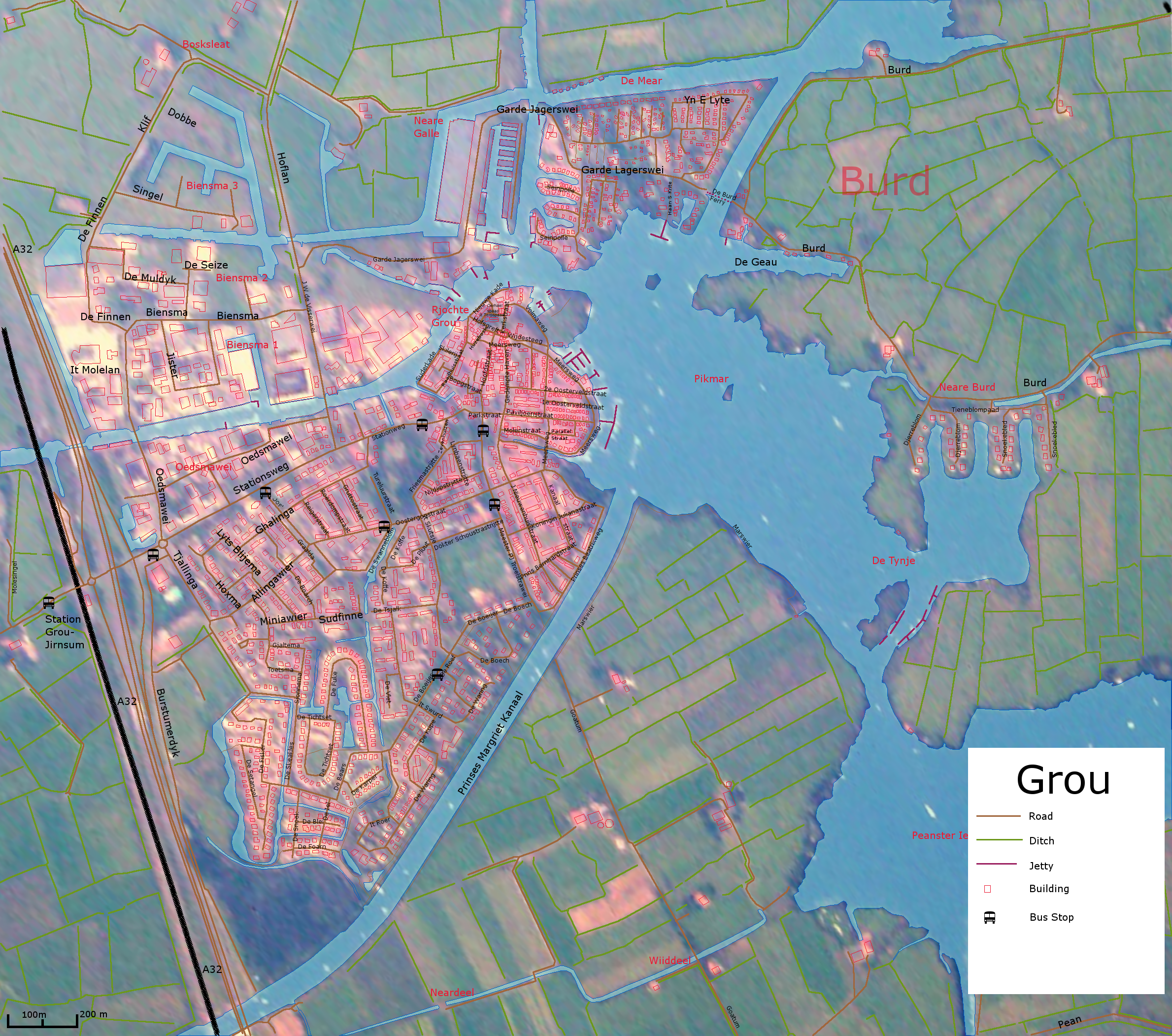
map of Grou

1954	1959	1964	1969	1973	1990	1999
3453	3522	3880	4129	4600	5316	5472
2002	2004	2005	2006	2007	2008	2009
5731	5916	5875	5769	5737	5673	5634
2011
5623

== Notable births ==
- Pibo Ovittius fan Abbema (ca. 1542-1618), clergyman
- Brothers Halbertsma
  - Eeltsje Hiddes Halbertsma (1797-1858), physician, poet and writer
  - Joast Hiddes Halbertsma (1789-1869), Mennonite minister, writer and poet
  - Tsjalling Hiddes Halbertsma (1792–1852), merchant and poet
- Atje Keulen-Deelstra (1938-2013), speed skater
- Haitske Pijlman (born 1954), speed skater

== Sport ==
An artificial ice rink (Glice) invented by Eric Sinnema was opened for public use in 2007.

== Gallery ==
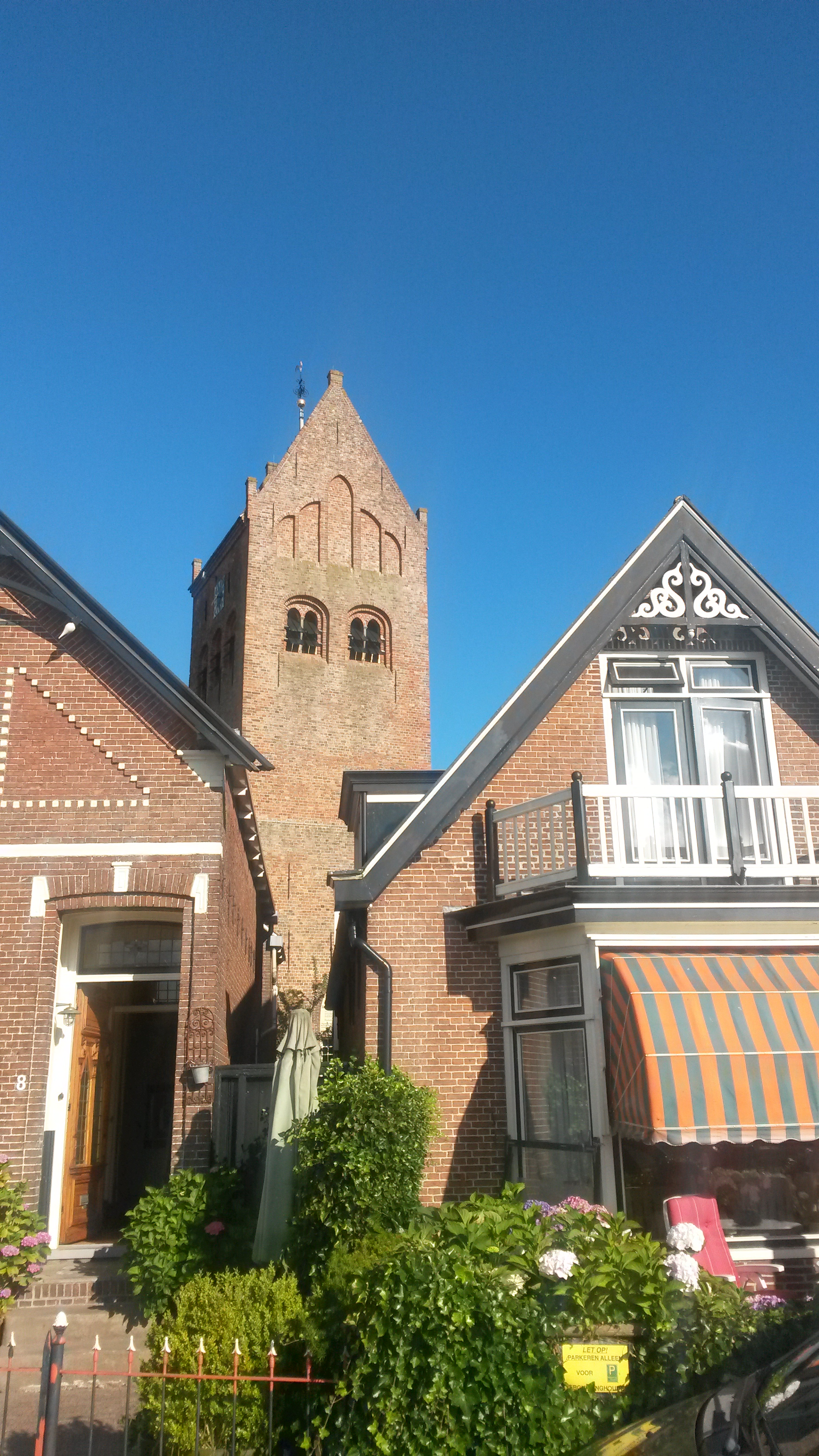
Houses near the harbour with St. Peter's church in the background

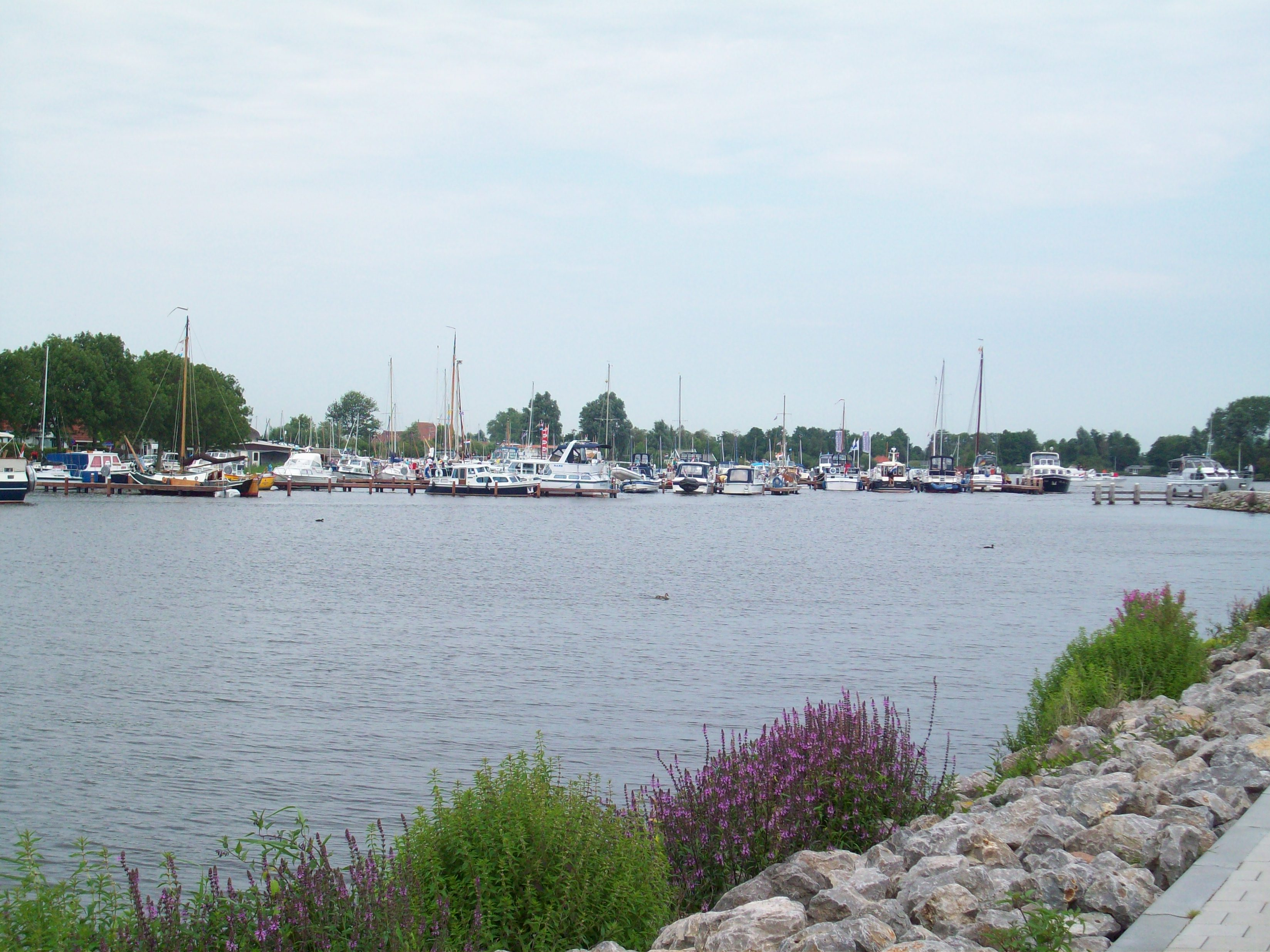
Grou harbour

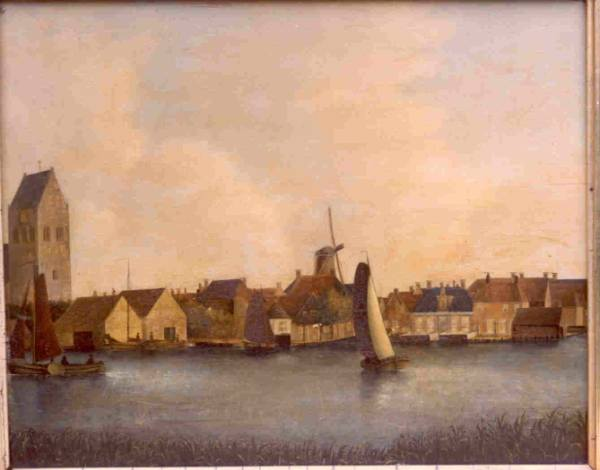
New quai 1850

== Notable buildings ==
- St. Peter's church
- Three restored windmills survive in Grou, De Bird, De Borgmolen and De Haensmolen.
