= Norgervaart =

- Hamlet
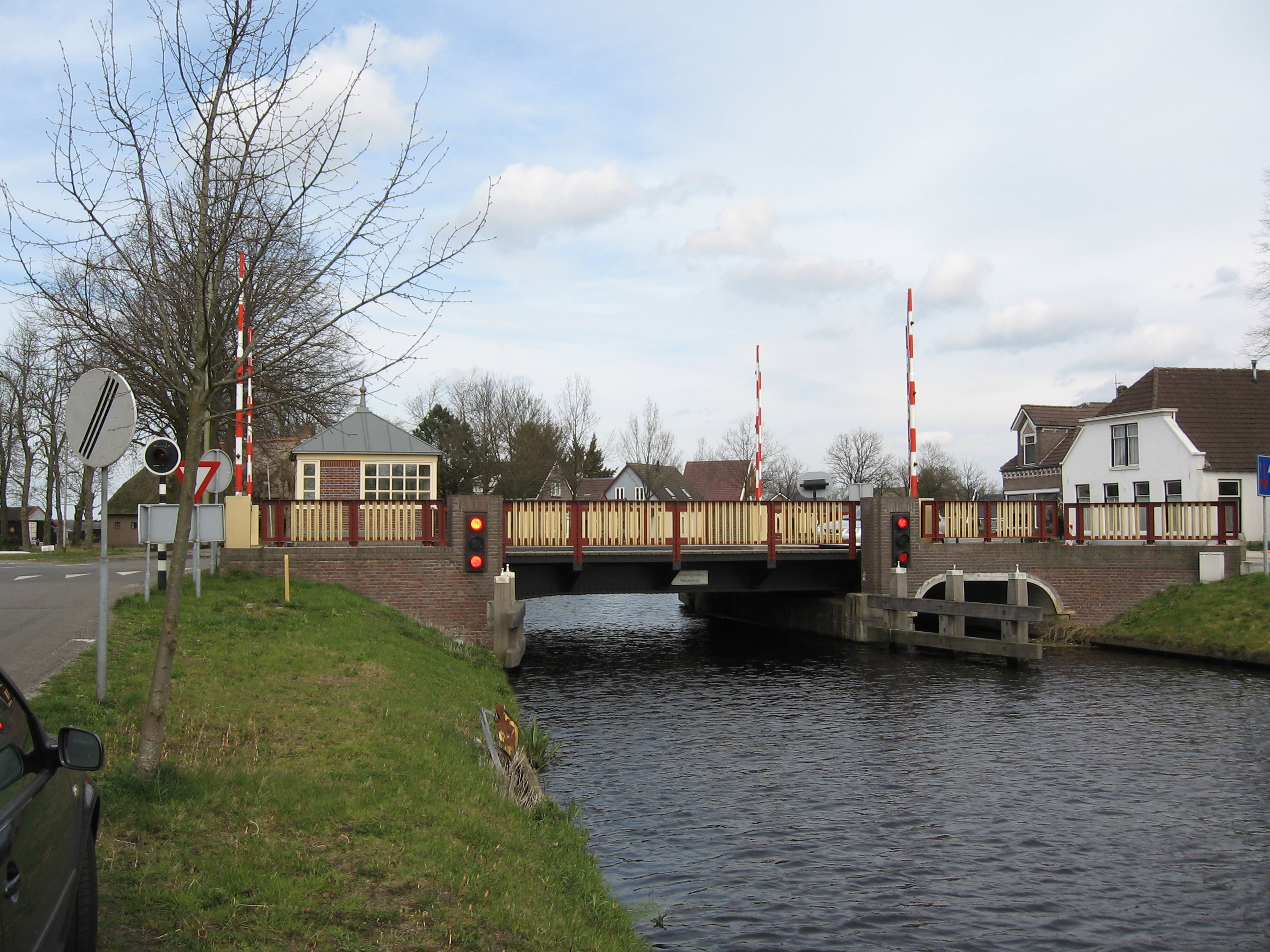
- Bridge over the Norgervaart

- Location in province of Drenthe in the Netherlands Norgervaart (Netherlands)
- Coordinates: 53.0007°N 6.4883°E
- Country: Netherlands
- Province: Drenthe
- Municipality: Noordenveld
- Elevation: 12 m (39 ft)
- Time zone: UTC+1 (CET)
  - Summer (DST): UTC+2 (CEST)
- Postal code: 9336
- Dialing code: 0592

Norgervaart is a hamlet in the Netherlands and is part of the Noordenveld municipality in Drenthe. It is located along the eponymous canal. The canal between Norg and Huis ter Heide was completed in 1816.

Norgervaart is not a statistical entity, and is listed under Huis ter Heide in the postal code. There are about 20 houses in Norgervaart.
