= Boerlaan =

- Hamlet
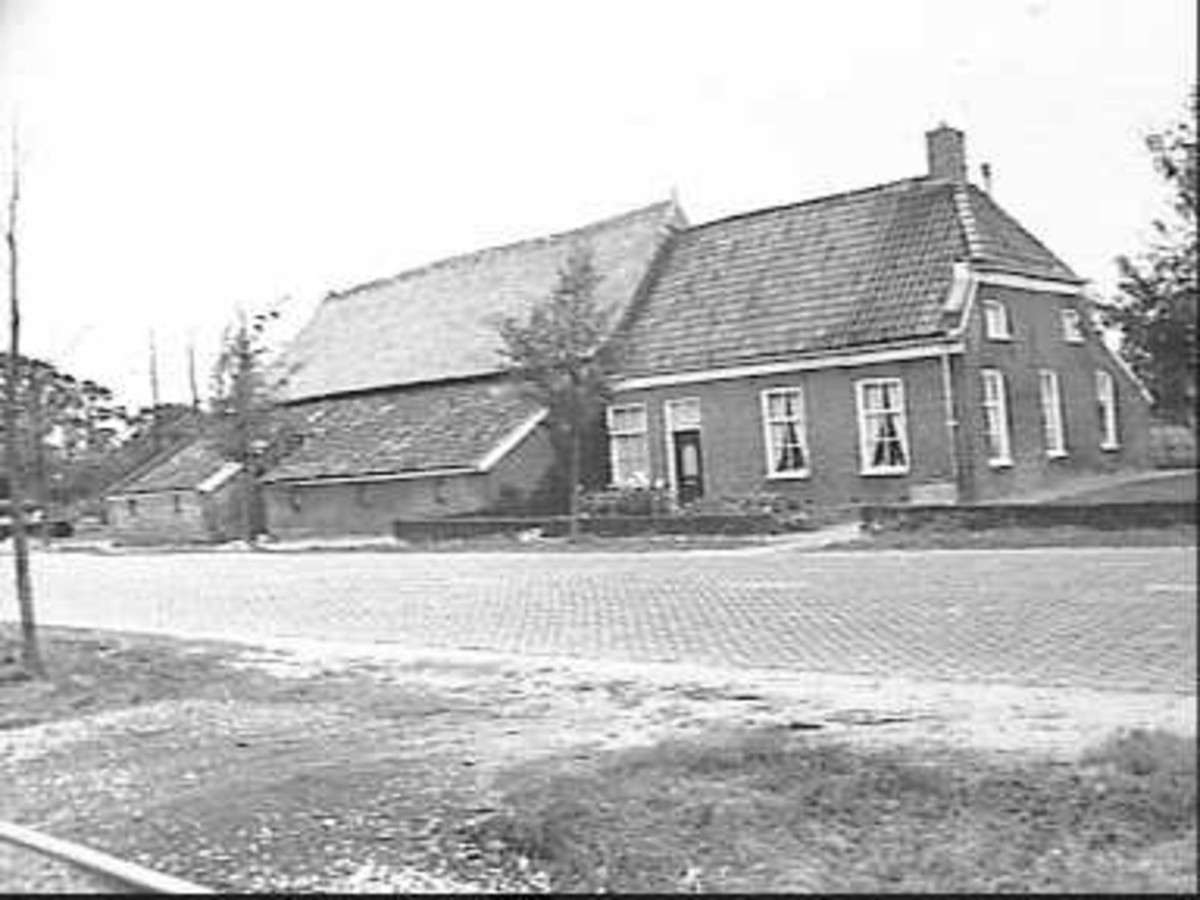
- Farm in Boerlaan (1963)

- Location in province of Drenthe in the Netherlands Boerlaan (Netherlands)
- Coordinates: 53.13200°N 6.48944°E
- Country: Netherlands
- Province: Drenthe
- Municipality: Noordenveld
- Elevation: 2 m (6.6 ft)
- Time zone: UTC+1 (CET)
  - Summer (DST): UTC+2 (CEST)
- Postal code: 9321
- Dialing code: 050

Boerlaan is a hamlet in the Netherlands and is part of the Noordenveld municipality in Drenthe.

Boerlaan is not a statistical unit, and it is listed under the postal code for Peize. It contains about 40 houses. It has no place signs, and is indicated by the street signs. The hamlet developed in the 1850s.
