= Matsloot =

- Hamlet
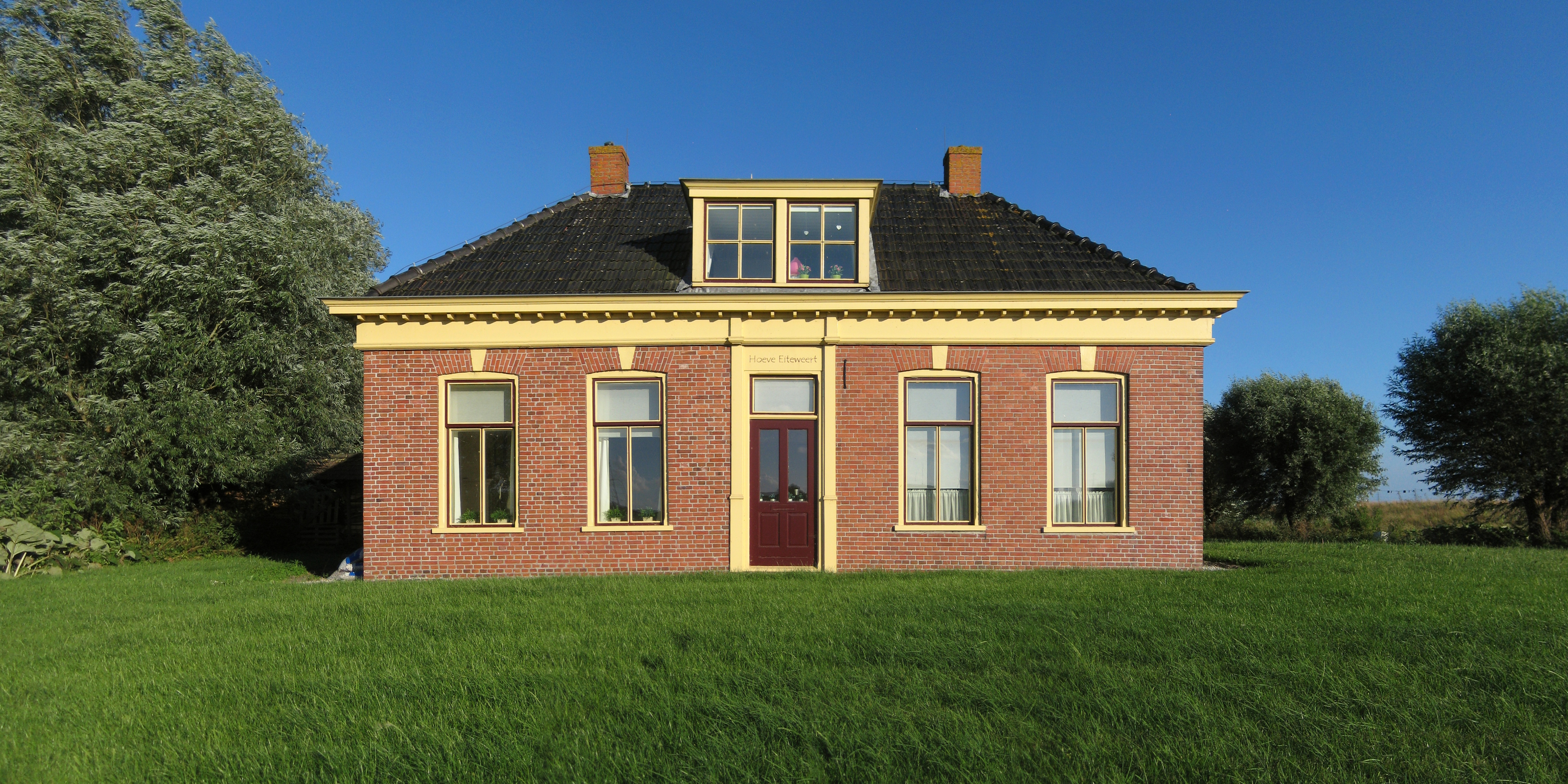
- Farm in Matsloot

- Location in province of Drenthe in the Netherlands Matsloot (Netherlands)
- Coordinates: 53.20030°N 6.46564°E
- Country: Netherlands
- Province: Drenthe
- Municipality: Noordenveld
- Elevation: 0 m (0 ft)
- Time zone: UTC+1 (CET)
  - Summer (DST): UTC+2 (CEST)
- Postal code: 9749
- Dialing code: 050

Matsloot is a hamlet in the Netherlands, and is divided over the municipalities Groningen in province Groningen, and Noordenveld in Drenthe.

Matsloot is not a statistical entity, but does have its own postal code. It has about 10 houses in Noordenveld and one in Groningen. It was first mentioned in 1781 as "De mat sloot" and means "the ditch near the meadow". In 1840, it was home to 61 people. During the construction of the A7 motorway, the hamlet was split in two, and the motorway became between the new border between Groningen and Drenthe.
