= Langelo =

- Village
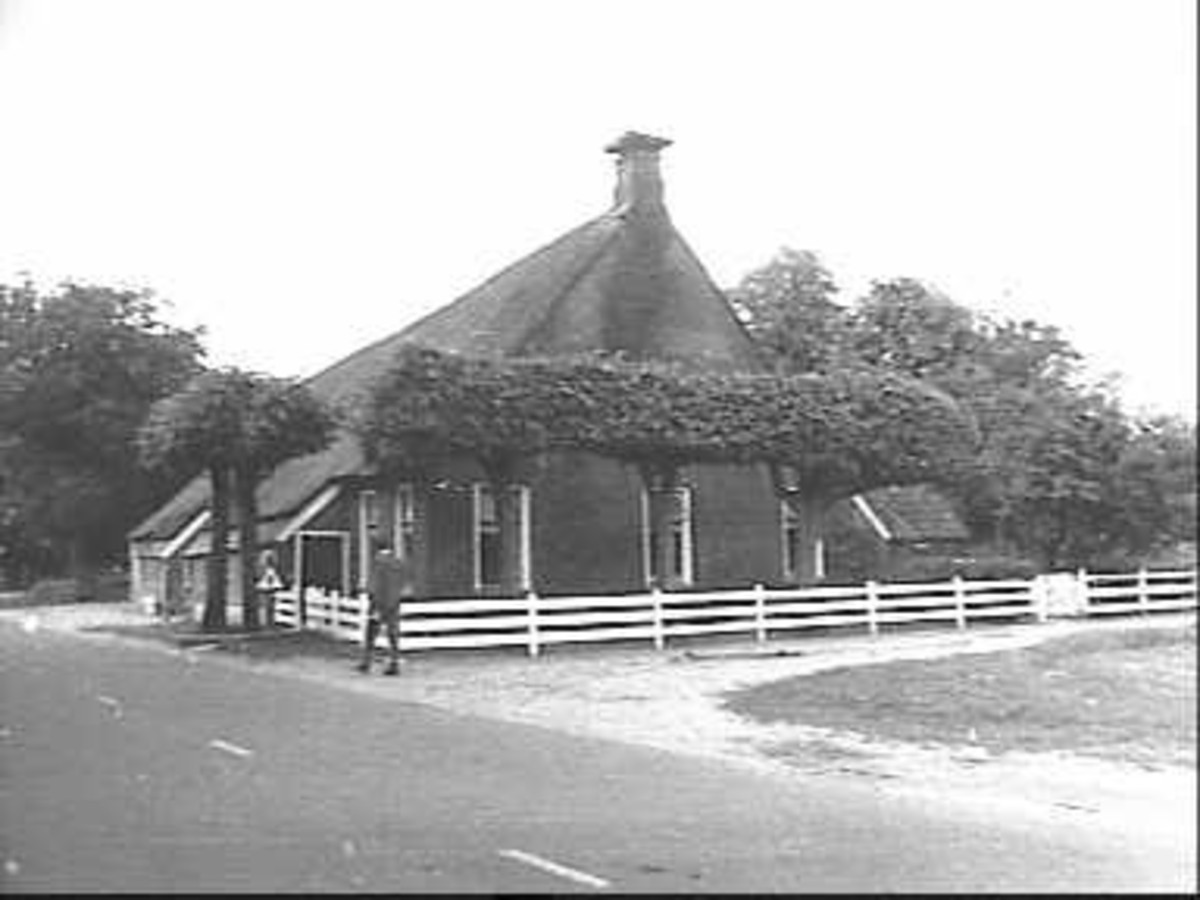
- Farm in Langelo

- Location in province of Drenthe in the Netherlands Langelo (Netherlands)
- Coordinates: 53°5′36″N 6°26′42″E
- Country: Netherlands
- Province: Drenthe
- Municipality: Noordenveld

Area
  - Total: 8.57 km^{2} (3.31 sq mi)
- Elevation: 7 m (23 ft)

Population (2021)
  - Total: 235
  - Density: 27.4/km^{2} (71.0/sq mi)
- Time zone: UTC+1 (CET)
  - Summer (DST): UTC+2 (CEST)
- Postal code: 9333
- Dialing code: 0592

Langelo is a village located in the Netherlands, part of the Noordenveld municipality in Drenthe.

Langelo is an esdorp which developed in the middle ages on the higher grounds. It contains two triangular communal pastures. It first appeared in 1225 as Rodolphus de Langele and means "long forest". In 1840, it was home to 125 people.

The village is noted for several historic farms, the oldest of which dates to 1792. Society Aardolie, a huge complex that serves as a gas storage facility, is also located in the village.
