= Terheijl =

- Hamlet
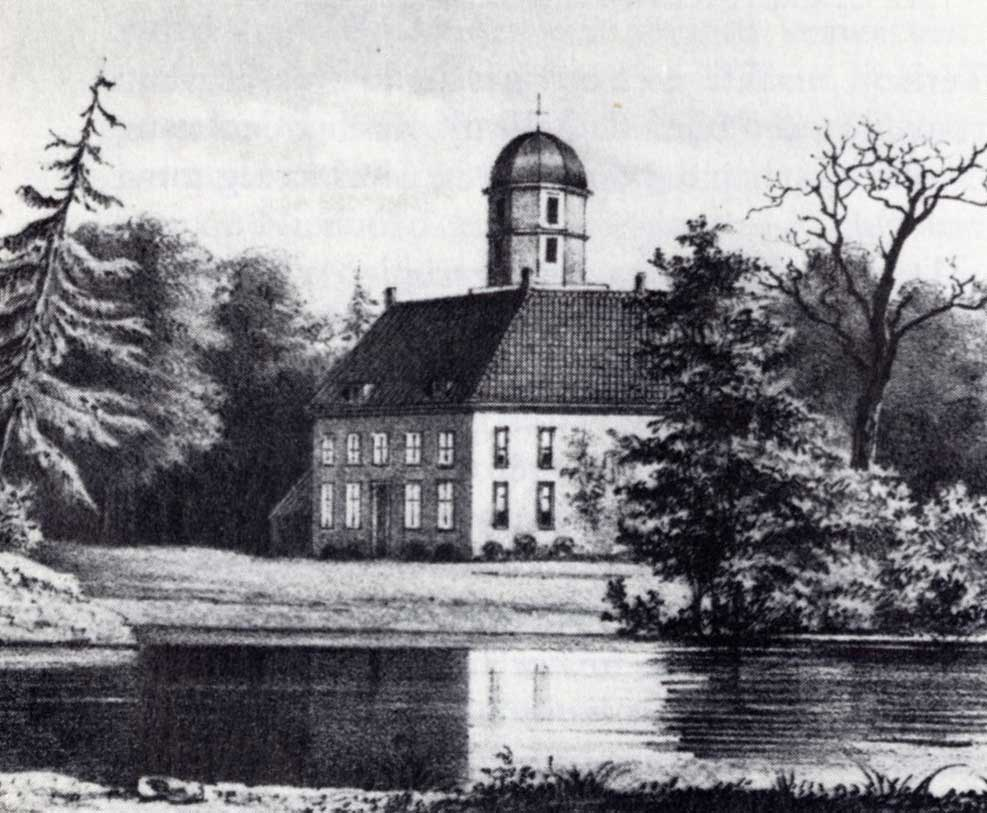
- Drawing of Terheijl by Jan Reijnders (before 1853)

- Location in province of Drenthe in the Netherlands Terheijl (Netherlands)
- Coordinates: 53°8′52″N 6°23′17″E
- Country: Netherlands
- Province: Drenthe
- Municipality: Noordenveld
- Elevation: 0 m (0 ft)
- Time zone: UTC+1 (CET)
  - Summer (DST): UTC+2 (CEST)
- Postal code: 9312
- Dialing code: 0594

Terheijl is a hamlet in the Netherlands and is part of the Noordenveld municipality in Drenthe.

Terheijl is not a statistical entity, and the postal authorities have placed it under Nietap. It has place name signs, but is outside the build-up area. It was first mentioned in 1325 as "Hermannes de Helle" which means "the hollow of Herman".

The Aduard Abbey operated a farm near Terheijl since the Middle Ages. In 1594, it became property of the Province of Groningen. In 1626, it was sold to Caspar van Ewsum, the landdrost of Drenthe who turned it into an estate. The last noble owner was Baron van Westerholt who died in 1852. In 1853, it was sold and the estate was demolished to construct a large farm.

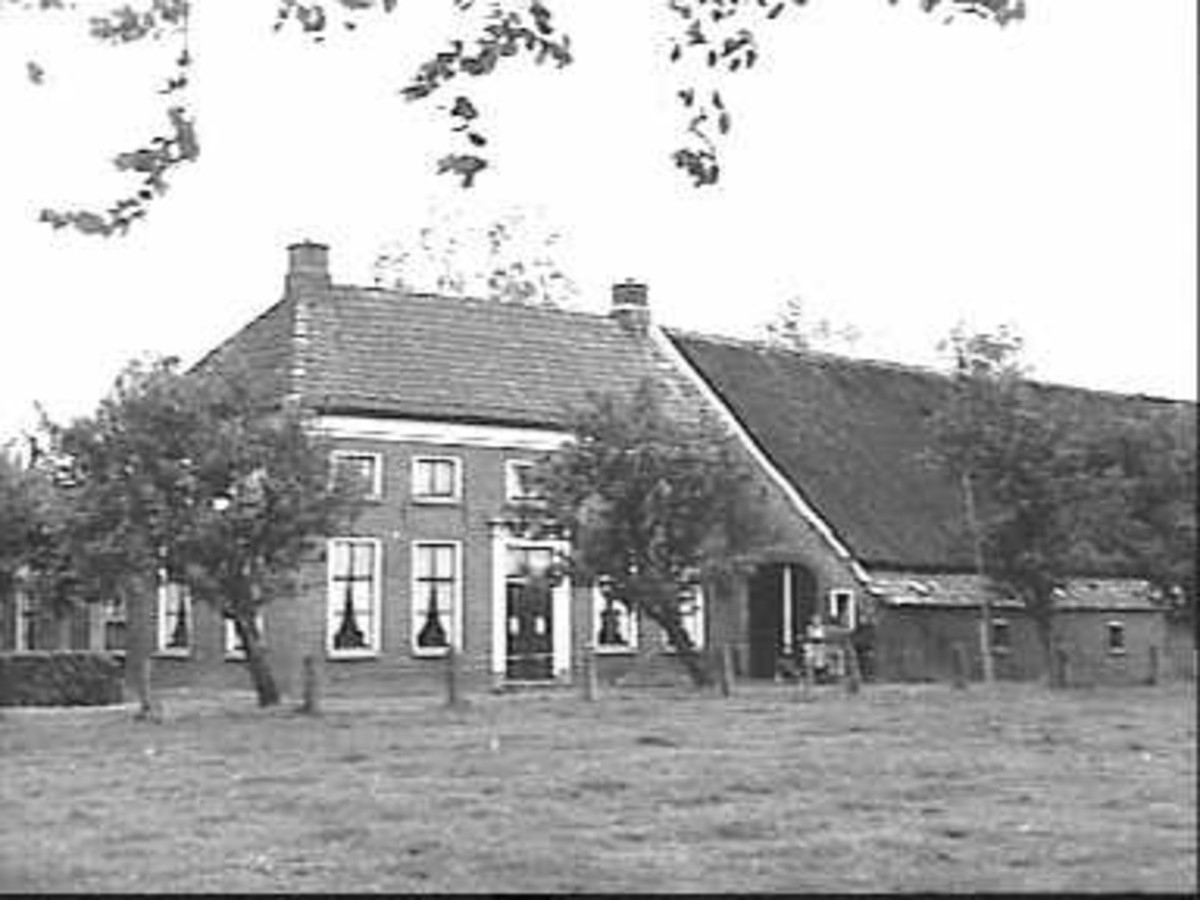
Farm in Terheijl (1961)
