= Foxwolde =

- Hamlet
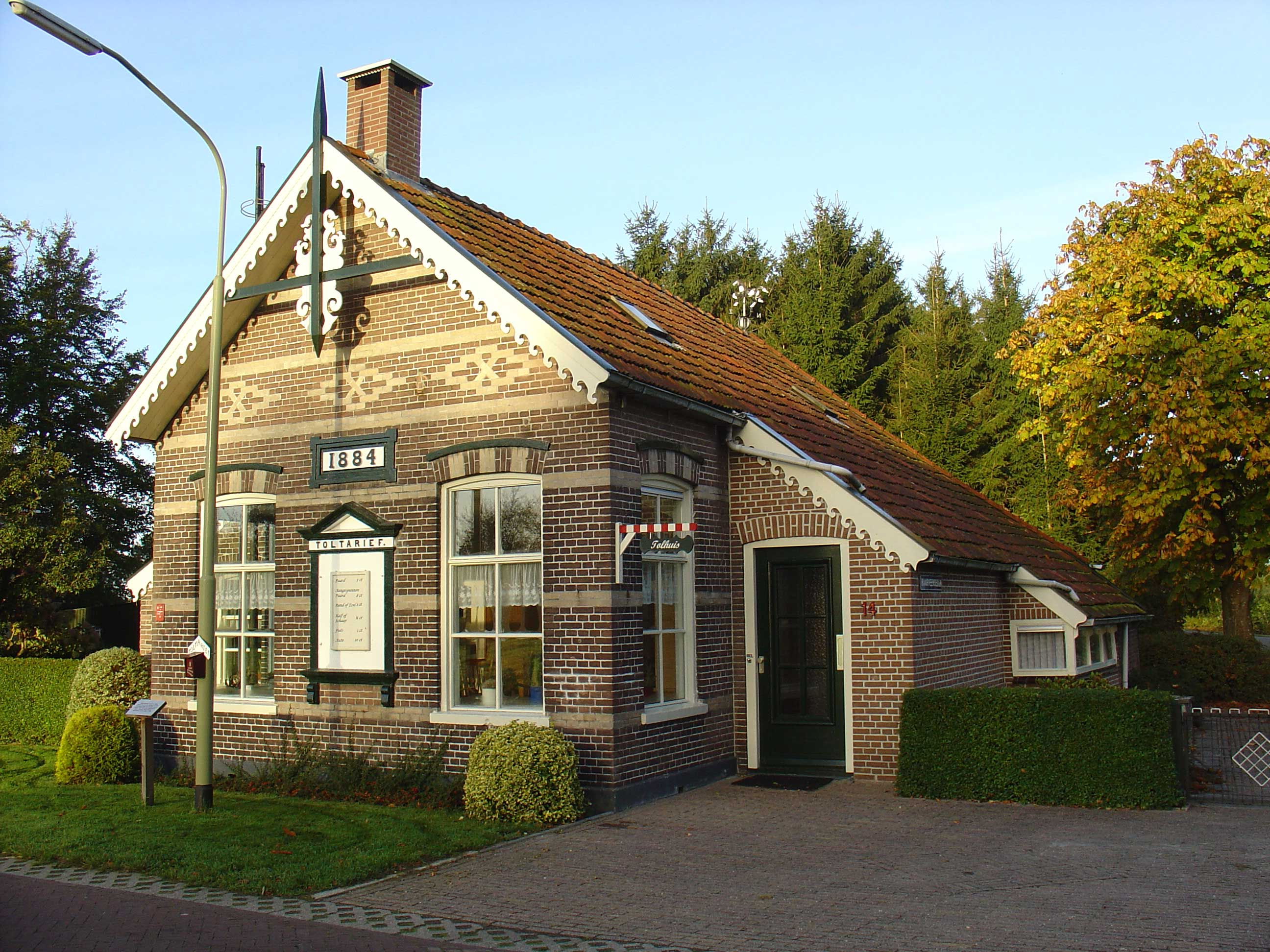
- Toll house on the Roderwolderweg in Foxwolde

- Location in province of Drenthe in the Netherlands Foxwolde (Netherlands)
- Coordinates: 53.15345°N 6.45108°E
- Country: Netherlands
- Province: Drenthe
- Municipality: Noordenveld

Area
  - Total: 1.14 km^{2} (0.44 sq mi)
- Elevation: 1 m (3.3 ft)

Population (2021)
  - Total: 160
  - Density: 140/km^{2} (360/sq mi)
- Time zone: UTC+1 (CET)
  - Summer (DST): UTC+2 (CEST)
- Postal code: 9314
- Dialing code: 050

Foxwolde is a hamlet in the Netherlands and it is part of the Noordenveld municipality in Drenthe.

Foxwolde is a statistical entity, and its own postal code. It was first mentioned in 1313 as Fokeswolde and means "the forest of Fokko". The hamlet is outside the build up area, and mainly consists of farms. The population in 1840 was 122 people.
