= Roderesch =

- Village
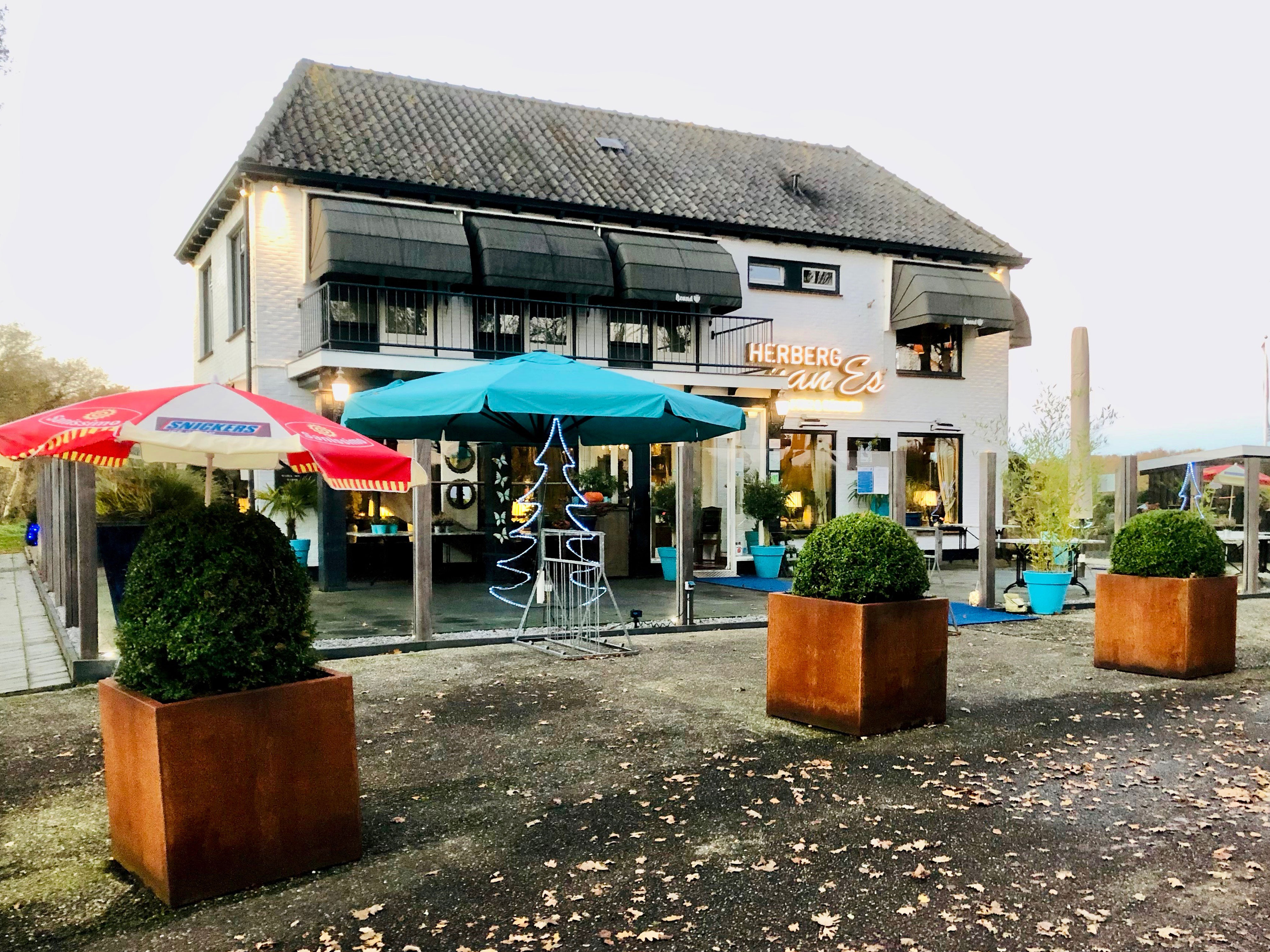
- Inn van Es at Roderesch

- Location in province of Drenthe in the Netherlands Roderesch (Netherlands)
- Coordinates: 53.1143°N 6.4250°E
- Country: Netherlands
- Province: Drenthe
- Municipality: Noordenveld

Area
  - Total: 0.39 km^{2} (0.15 sq mi)
- Elevation: 7 m (23 ft)

Population (2021)
  - Total: 250
  - Density: 640/km^{2} (1,700/sq mi)
- Time zone: UTC+1 (CET)
  - Summer (DST): UTC+2 (CEST)
- Postal code: 9305
- Dialing code: 050

Roderesch is a village in the Netherlands, and is part of the Noordenveld municipality in Drenthe.

== History ==
Roderesch is an esdorp which developed in the 19th century during the excavation of peat. It was first mentioned in the 1850s as "Roonder Esch", a (farm) field on higher ground near Roden. In 1913, the first school was established in the village. There are several forests around Roderesch.

== Work camp ==
In 1930, it was decided to build a work camp for the unemployed near Roderesch. In 1934, construction started on the 6 hectares (15 acres) terrain. It opened in 1936, and groups of about 140 men stayed in the camp for nine weeks. During World War II, it was first used the Germans and later the Canadians. In 1955, a youth hostel was opened in the camp which closed in 1985. Since 1996, it is in private ownership for group accommodations as De Zwerfsteen.

== Gallery ==
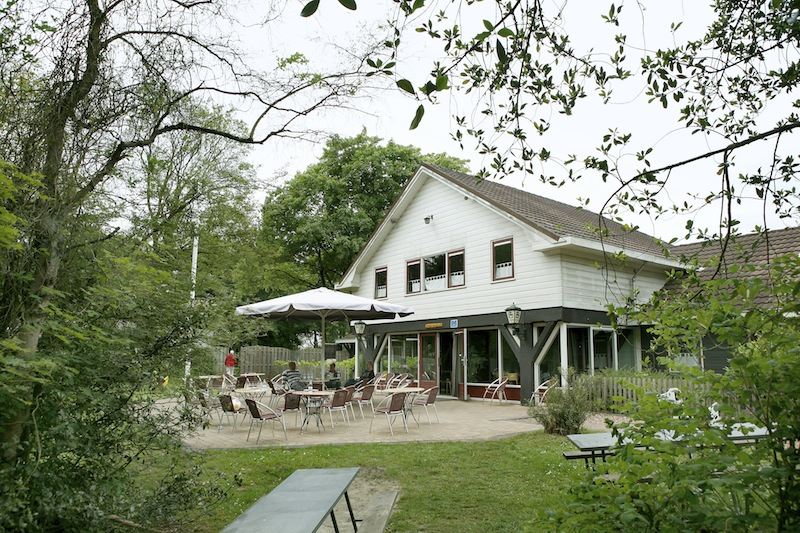
Former work camp Roden. Nowadays De Zwerfsteen

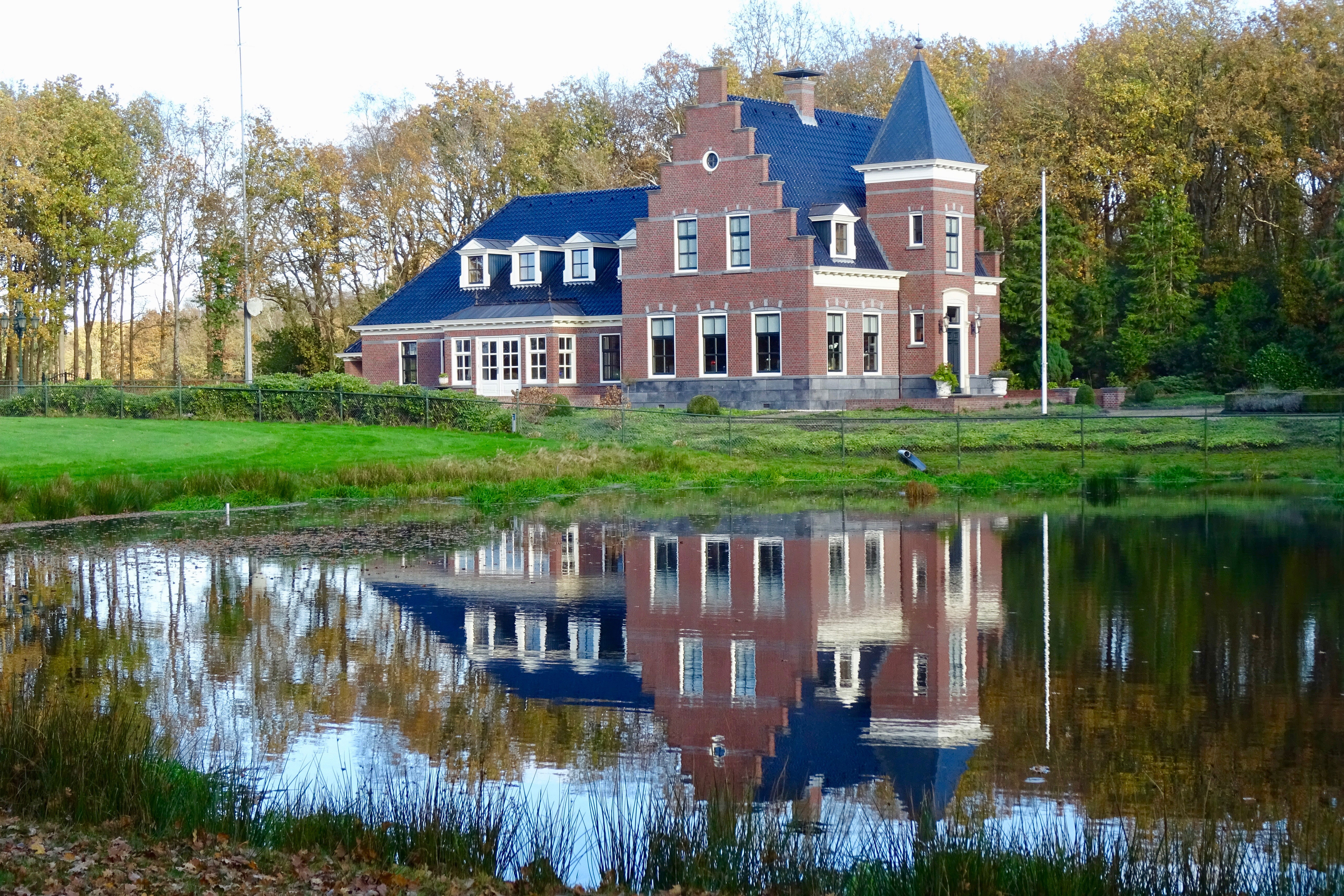
Heideborch near Roderesch
