= Peizermade =

- Hamlet
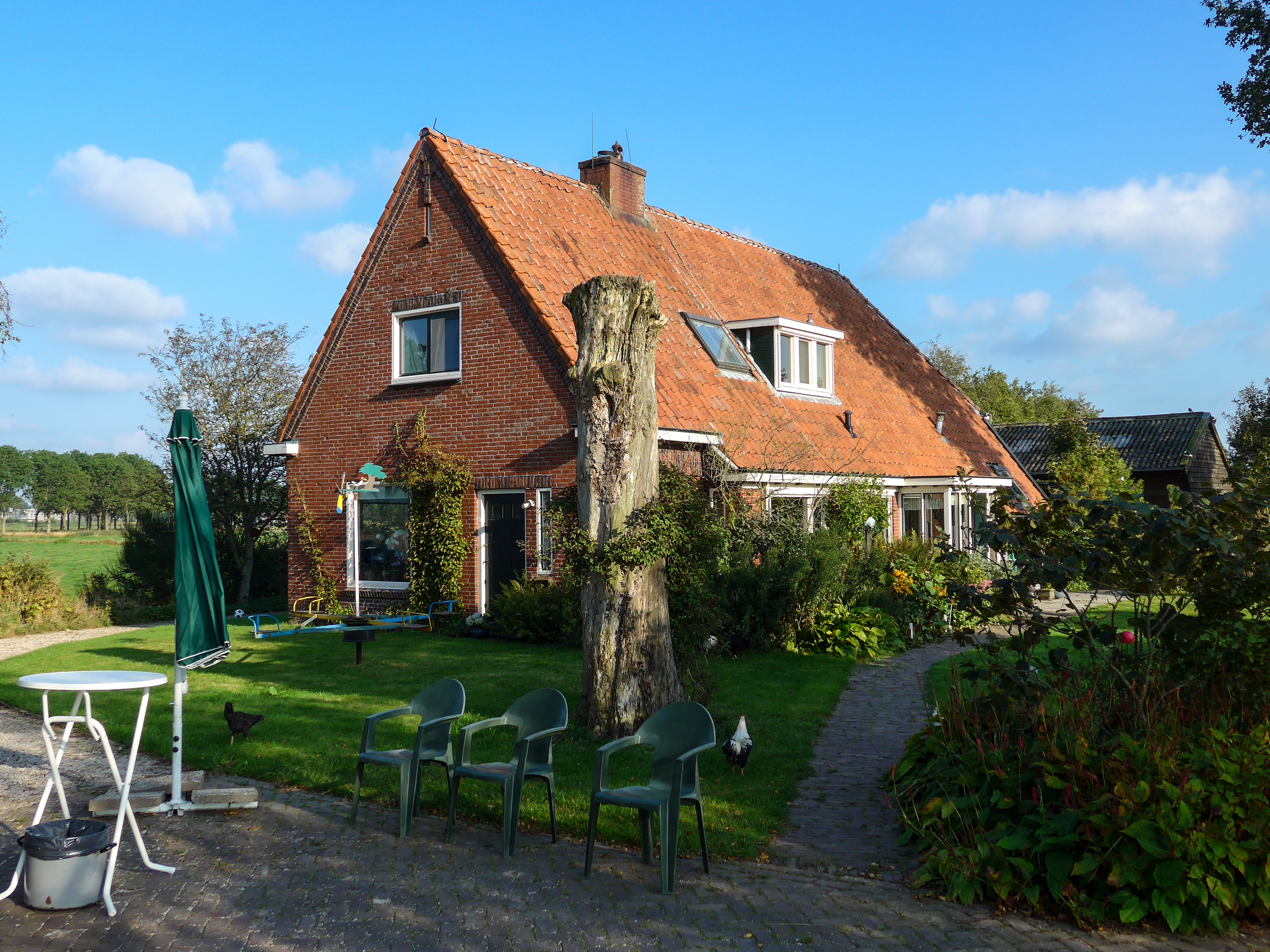
- Former service house of the pumping station

- Location in province of Drenthe in the Netherlands Peizermade (Netherlands)
- Coordinates: 53°11′31″N 6°30′41″E
- Country: Netherlands
- Province: Drenthe
- Municipality: Noordenveld

Area
  - Total: 0.53 km^{2} (0.20 sq mi)
- Elevation: 2 m (6.6 ft)

Population (2021)
  - Total: 120
  - Density: 230/km^{2} (590/sq mi)
- Time zone: UTC+1 (CET)
  - Summer (DST): UTC+2 (CEST)
- Postal code: 9321
- Dialing code: 050

Peizermade is a hamlet in the Netherlands and is part of the Noordenveld municipality in Drenthe.

== Overview ==
Peizermade is a statistical entity, however the postal authorities have placed it under Peize. It was first mentioned in 1899, and means the meadow belonging to Peize. It is mainly a linear settlement along the N372.

== Gallery ==
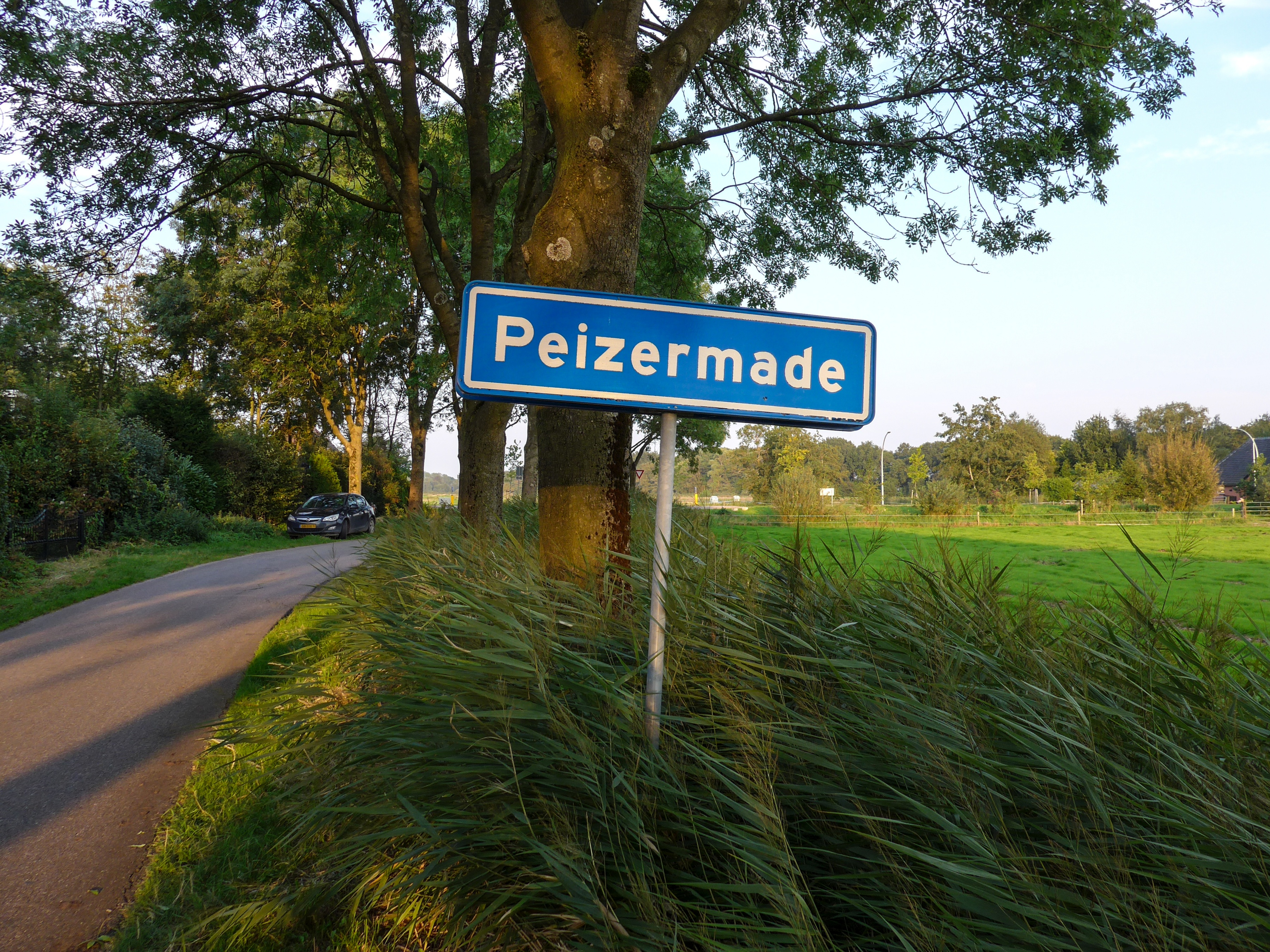
City limit sign (2014)

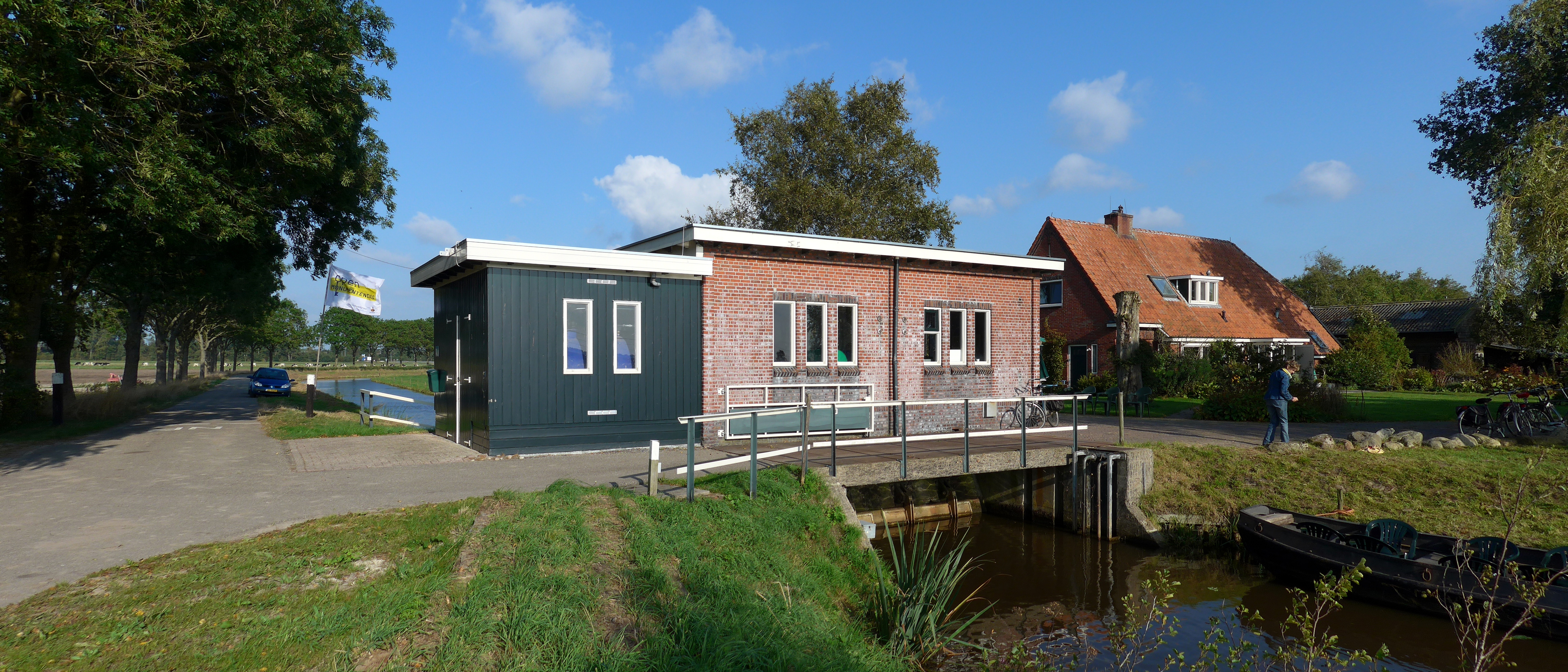
Pumping station
