= Lieveren =

- Village
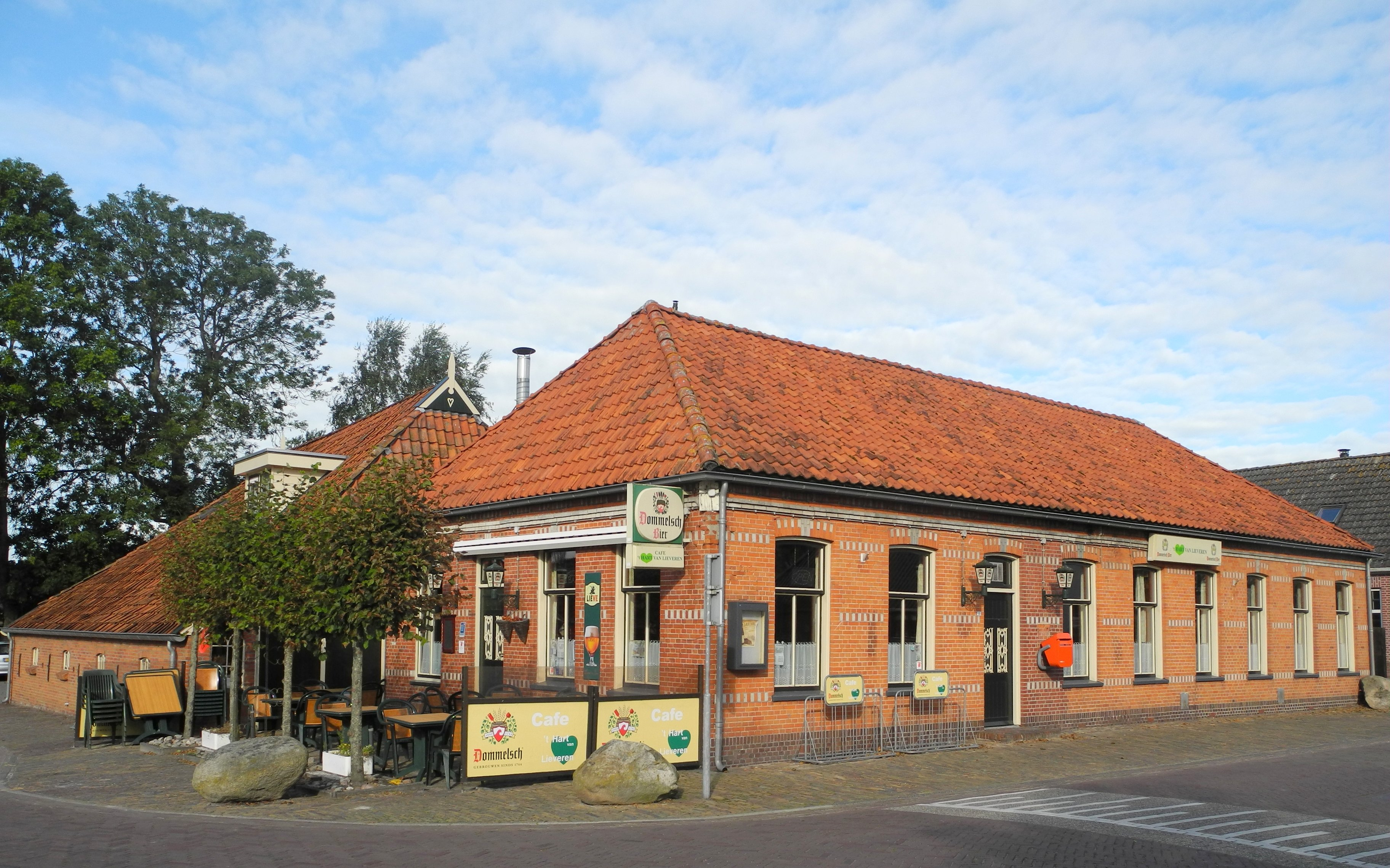
- Pub 't Hart van Lieveren

- Location in province of Drenthe in the Netherlands Lieveren (Netherlands)
- Coordinates: 53°6′55″N 6°27′8″E
- Country: Netherlands
- Province: Drenthe
- Municipality: Noordenveld

Area
  - Total: 0.24 km^{2} (0.093 sq mi)
- Elevation: 4 m (13 ft)

Population (2021)
  - Total: 120
  - Density: 500/km^{2} (1,300/sq mi)
- Time zone: UTC+1 (CET)
  - Summer (DST): UTC+2 (CEST)
- Postal code: 9304
- Dialing code: 050

Lieveren is a village in the Netherlands and is part of the Noordenveld municipality in Drenthe.

Lieveren is an esdorp which formed along the Lieverse Diep in the early middle ages. It was first mentioned in 1480 as Tho Liveren. The etymology is unclear. Most of the river has been canalised, however it still meanders through the landscape near Lieveren. In 1840, Lieveren was home to 93 people. The local pub is the only monument of the village.

== Gallery ==
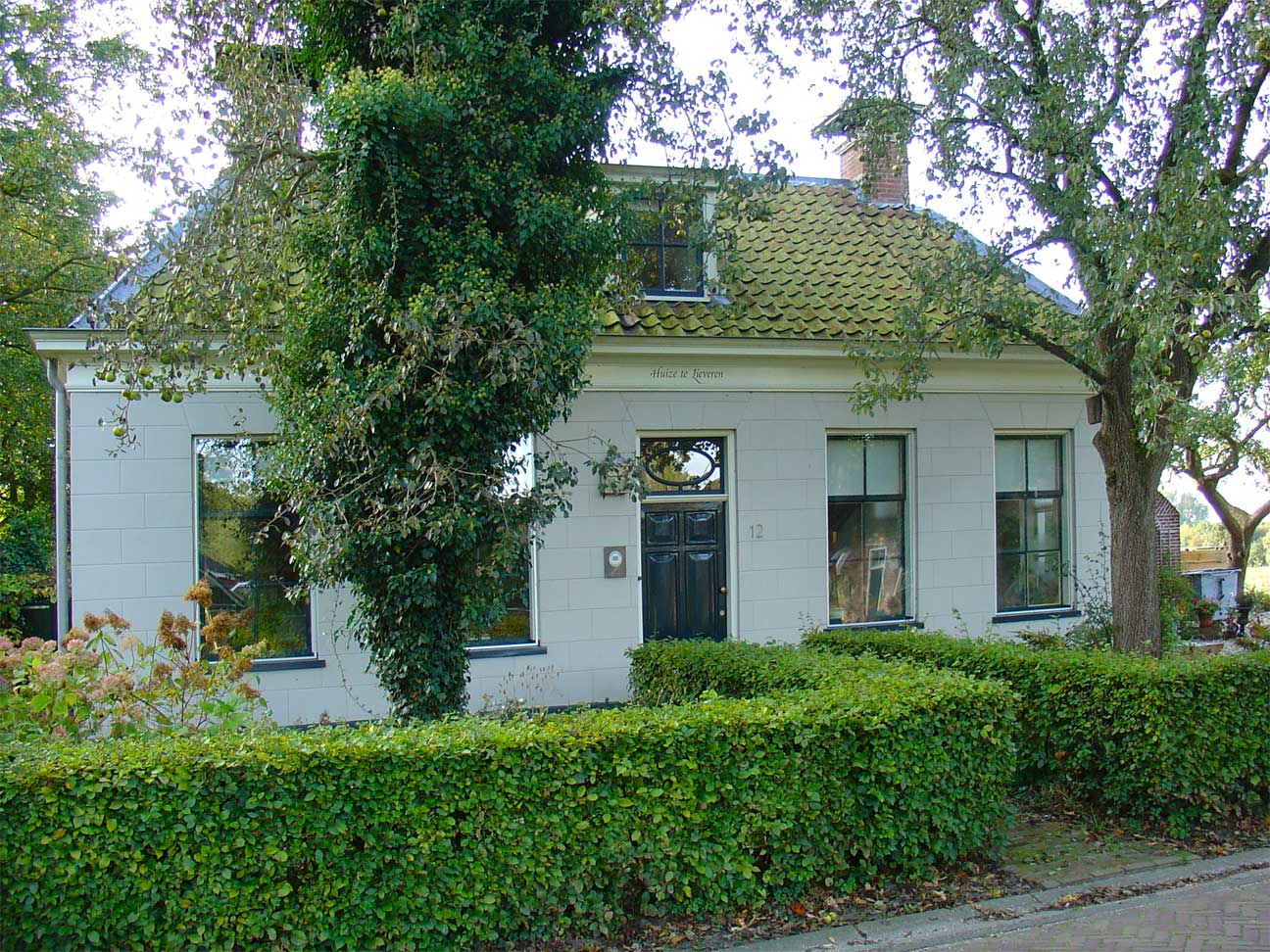
Huize te Lieveren

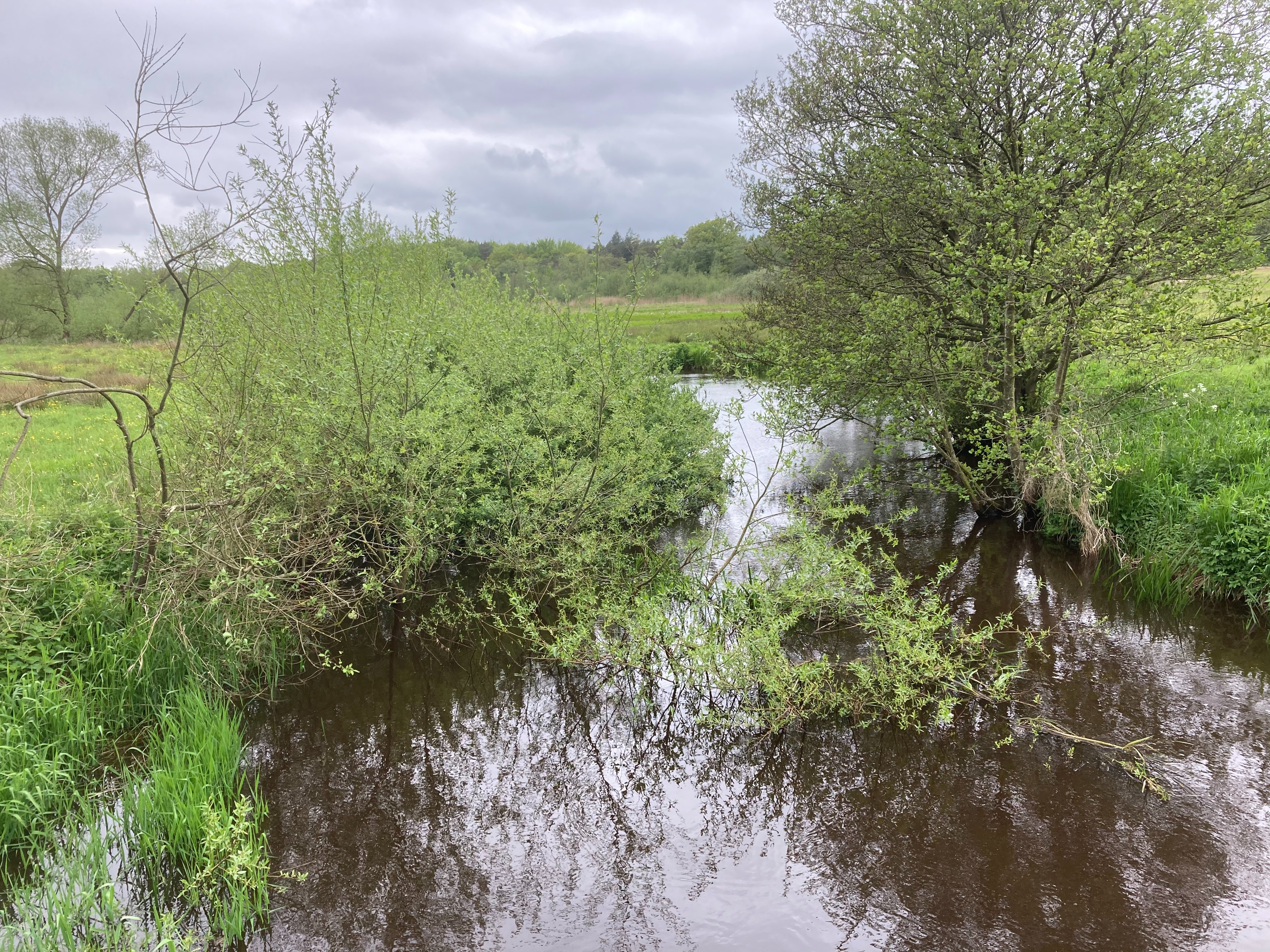
Fish trap near Lieveren
