= Alteveer, Noordenveld =

Alteveer
- Hamlet
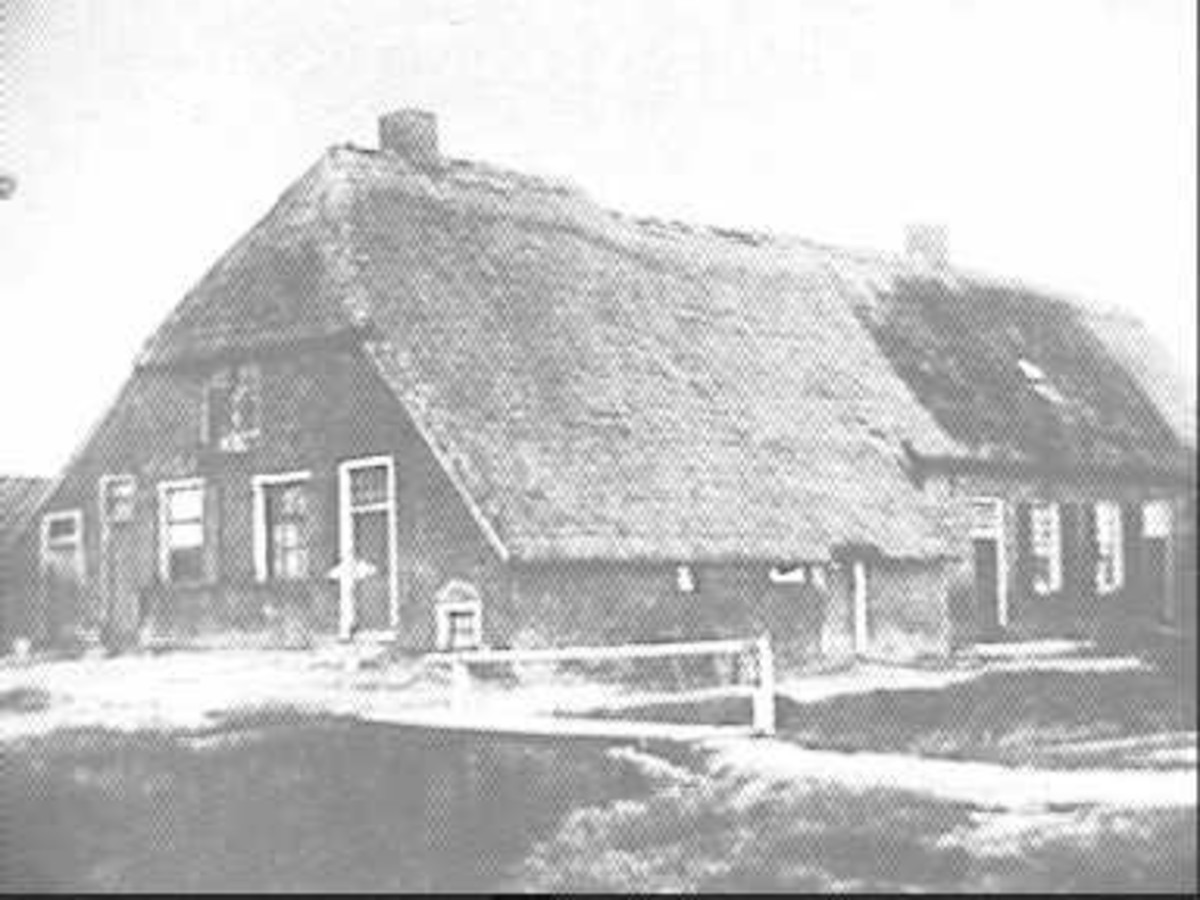
- Farm in Alteveer

- Location in province of Drenthe in the Netherlands Alteveer (Netherlands)
- Coordinates: 53°6′43″N 6°25′54″E
- Country: Netherlands
- Province: Drenthe
- Municipality: Noordenveld
- Elevation: 6 m (20 ft)
- Time zone: UTC+1 (CET)
  - Summer (DST): UTC+2 (CEST)
- Postal code: 9306
- Dialing code: 050

Alteveer is a hamlet in the Netherlands and it is part of the Noordenveld municipality in Drenthe.

Alteveer is not a statistical entity, but does have its own postal code. It was first mentioned in the 1850 and means "all too far", because it was not well connected to the outside world.

Alteveer is located outside the built-up area, and is home to an estimated 100 people. The first buildings were sod houses which were later replaced by little stone farms. Nowadays it has become an expensive suburban area of Roden because of its serene quietness and forests.
