= Noordenveld =

- Municipality
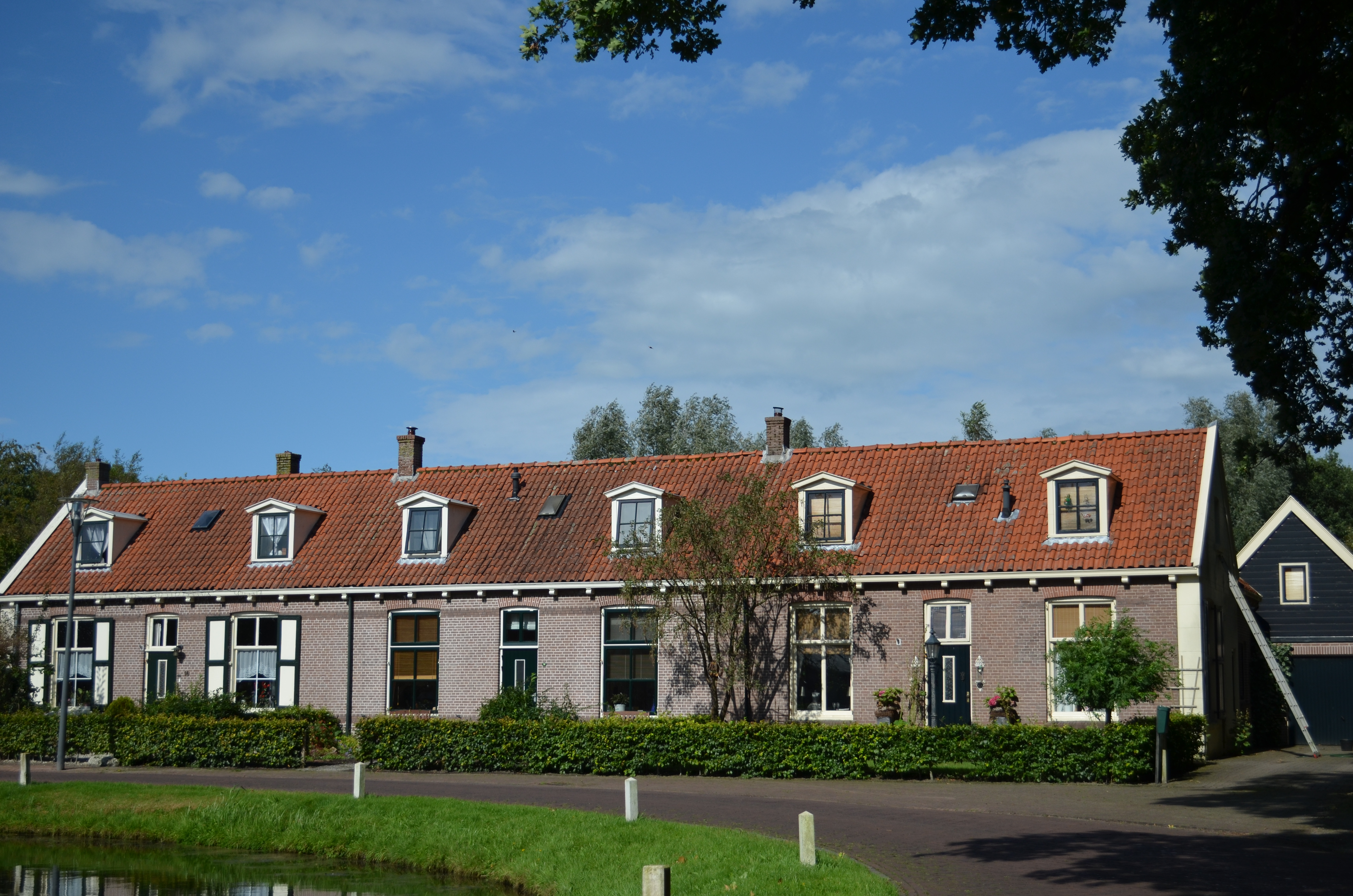
- Monumental rowhouses in Veenhuizen

- Flag Coat of arms

- Location in Drenthe
- Coordinates: 53°8′N 6°26′E
- Country: Netherlands
- Province: Drenthe
- Established: 1 January 1998

Government
  - Body: Municipal council
  - Mayor: Klaas Smid (PvdA)

Area
  - Total: 205.29 km^{2} (79.26 sq mi)
  - Land: 199.41 km^{2} (76.99 sq mi)
  - Water: 5.88 km^{2} (2.27 sq mi)
- Elevation: 3 m (9.8 ft)

Population (January 2021)
  - Total: 31,214
  - Density: 157/km^{2} (410/sq mi)
- Time zone: UTC+1 (CET)
  - Summer (DST): UTC+2 (CEST)
- Postcode: 9300–9349, 9749
- Area code: 050, 0516, 0592, 0594
- Website: www.noordenveld.nl
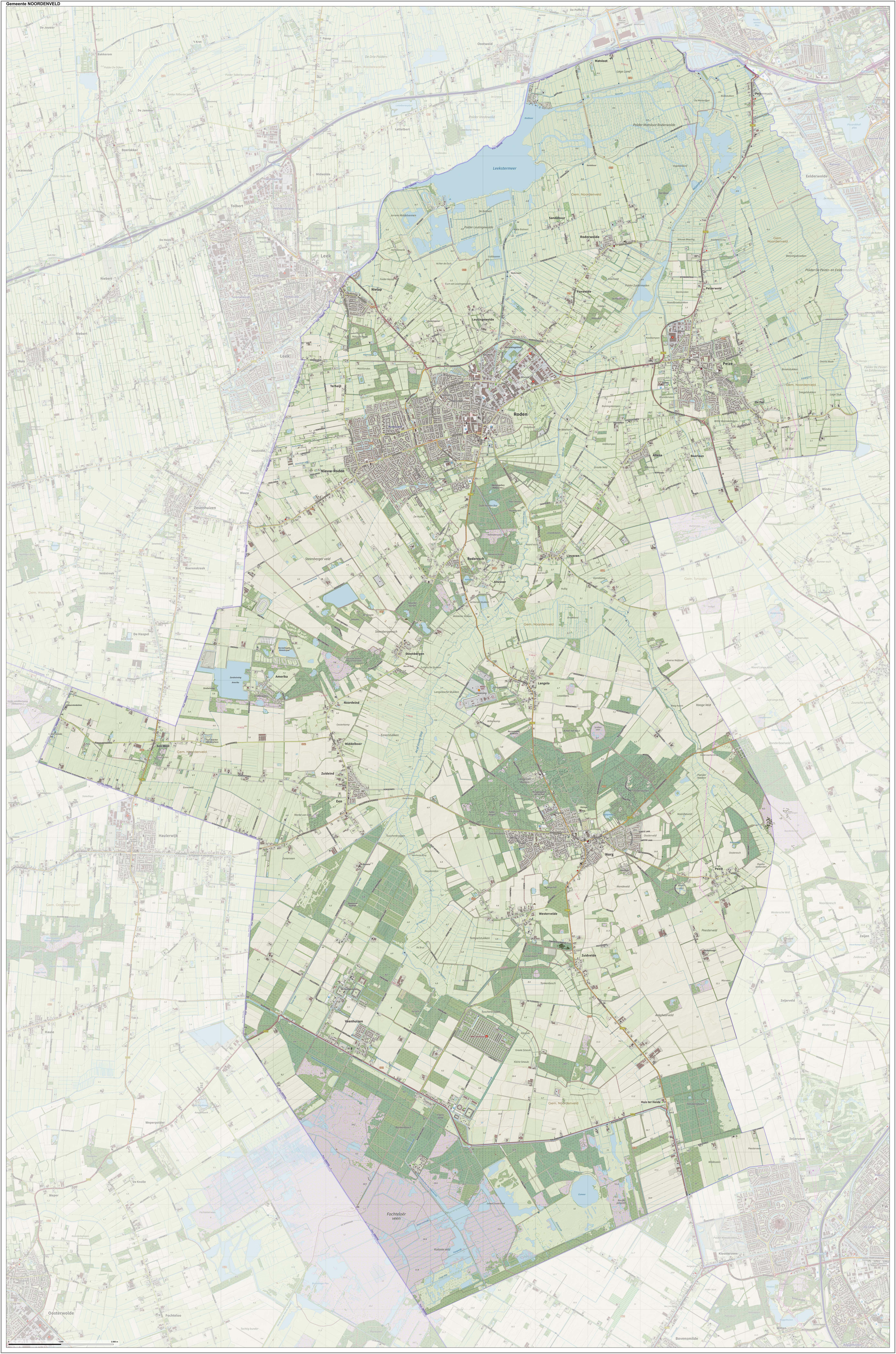
- Dutch Topographic map of the municipality of Noordenveld, June 2015.

Noordenveld (Dutch pronunciation: [ˈnoːrdə(ɱ)vɛlt]) is a municipality in the northeastern part of the Netherlands.

== Population centres ==
- Altena
- Alteveer
- Amerika
- Boerlaan
- De Horst
- De Pol
- Een
- Een-West
- Foxwolde
- Huis ter Heide
- Langelo
- Leutingewolde
- Lieveren
- Matsloot
- Nietap
- Nieuw-Roden
- Norg
- Norgervaart
- Peest
- Peize
- Peizermade
- Peizerwold
- Roden
- Roderesch
- Roderwolde
- Sandebuur
- Steenbergen
- Terheijl
- Veenhuizen
- Westervelde
- Zuidvelde

== Water Board Noordenveld ==
Noordenveld is also the name of a former Water Board, which had its office in Roden. Water Board Noordenveld arose from the Water Boards of Leutingewolde (1866-1967), De Zuidermaden (1914-1967), De Weehorst (1917-1967), De Peizer en Eeldermaden (1928-1984) and Matsloot-Roderwolde (1933-1984).

In 1995, Water Board Noordenveld was merged into Water Board Noorderzijlvest, based in Onderdendam.

== Notable people ==
- Hindericus Scheepstra (1859 in Roden – 1913) a Dutch writer, wrote children's book series Ot en Sien (1902).
- Jan Britstra (1905 in Norg – 1987) a Dutch hurdler, competed in the 110 metres hurdles at the 1928 Summer Olympics
- J. P. Kuiper (1922 in Norg – 1985) a professor of social medicine, promoted the idea of unconditional basic income
- Harm Kuipers (born 1947 in Vries) academic, former speed skater and racing cyclist
