= Altena, Drenthe =

Altena
- Village
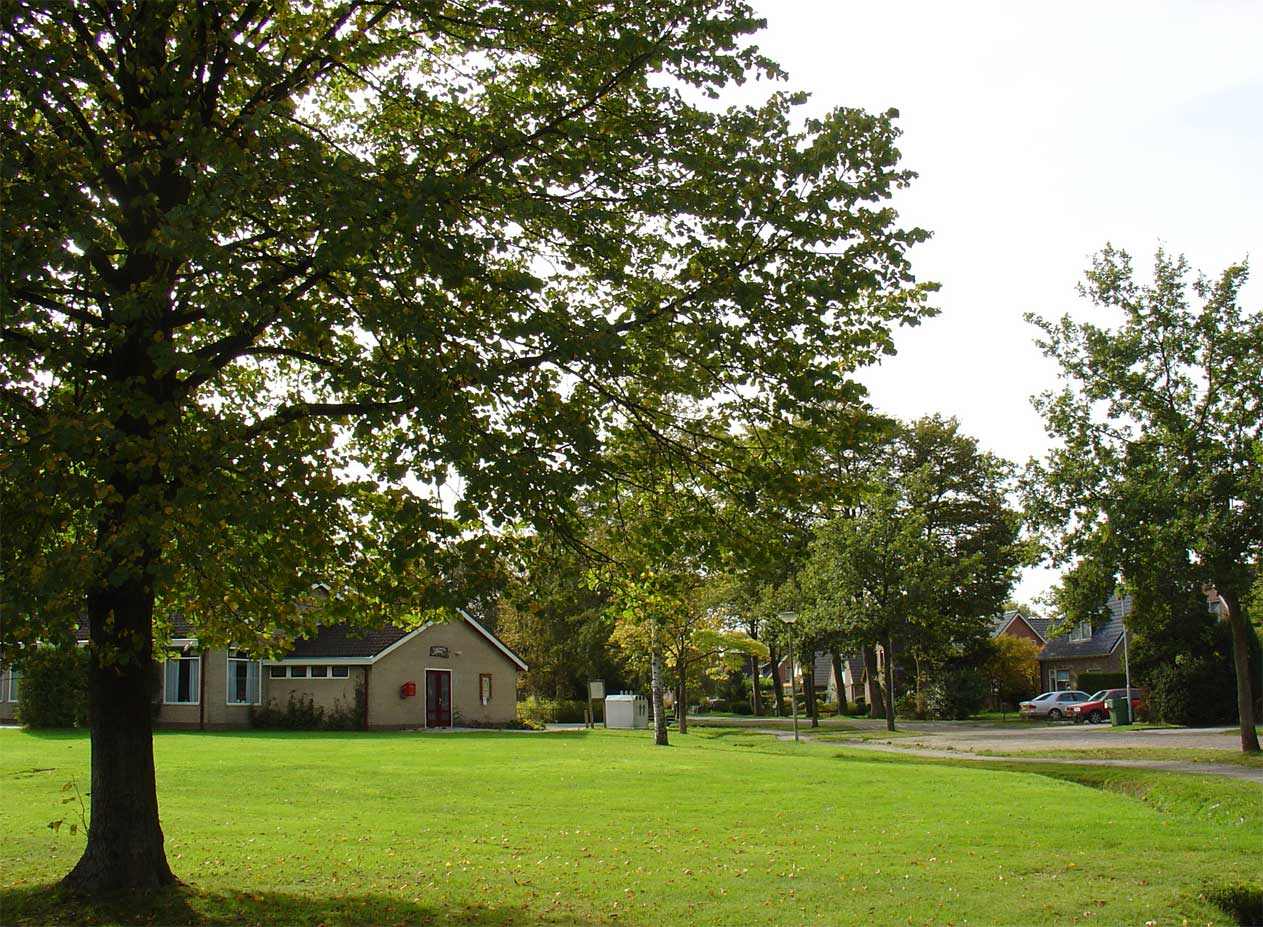

- Location in province of Drenthe in the Netherlands Altena (Netherlands)
- Coordinates: 53°07′56″N 6°28′34″E
- Country: Netherlands
- Province: Drenthe
- Municipality: Noordenveld

Area
  - Total: 0.19 km^{2} (0.073 sq mi)
- Elevation: 2 m (6.6 ft)

Population (2021)
  - Total: 320
  - Density: 1,700/km^{2} (4,400/sq mi)
- Time zone: UTC+1 (CET)
  - Summer (DST): UTC+2 (CEST)
- Postal code: 9321
- Dialing code: 050
- Website: buurtschap-altena.nl

Altena is a village in the northeastern Netherlands. It is located in the municipality of Noordenveld, Drenthe, 2 km southwest of Peize.

== History ==
Altena started around 1850 during the exploitation of peat in the Bunnerveen. The settlement used to consist of sod houses. They were replaced with normal houses in the early 20th century. In 1927, a school was established. In 1978, no postal code was assigned for Altena and it was placed under Peize. Up to 1998, it did not have a town limit sign, however the signs have been placed, it is listed in the telephone directory and has its own exit on the Peize bypass. Altena is starting to become more like a village than a hamlet.
