= Zuidvelde =

- Village
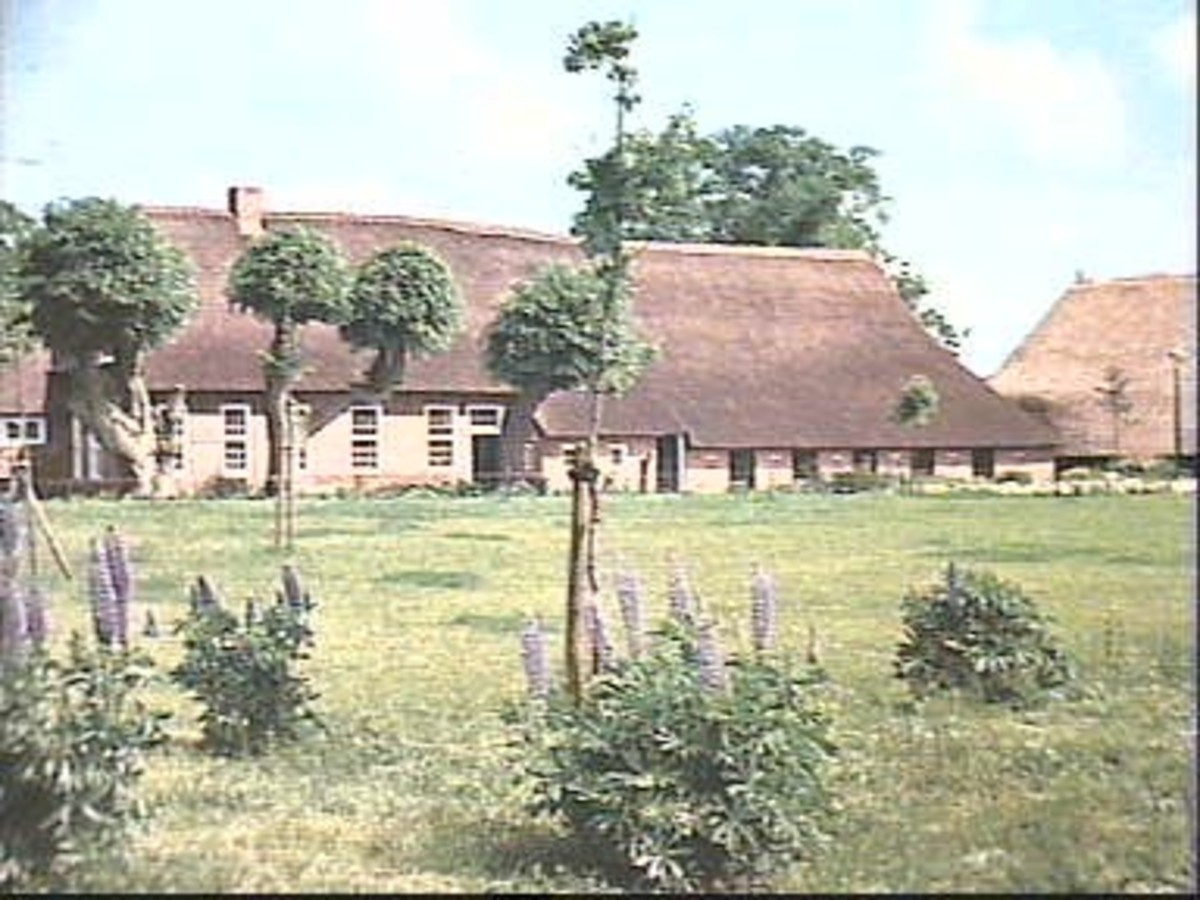
- Farm in Zuidvelde

- Location in province of Drenthe in the Netherlands Zuidvelde (Netherlands)
- Coordinates: 53°2′46″N 6°27′24″E
- Country: Netherlands
- Province: Drenthe
- Municipality: Noordenveld

Area
  - Total: 10.73 km^{2} (4.14 sq mi)
- Elevation: 9 m (30 ft)

Population (2021)
  - Total: 240
  - Density: 22/km^{2} (58/sq mi)
- Time zone: UTC+1 (CET)
  - Summer (DST): UTC+2 (CEST)
- Postal code: 9335 & 9337
- Dialing code: 0592

Zuidvelde is a village in the Netherlands and it is part of the Noordenveld municipality in Drenthe.

== History ==
Zuidvelde is an esdorp which developed in the Middle Ages on higher grounds. The large communal pasture of the village is grassed by sheep. It was first mentioned in 1325 as "Stephanus de Zutvelde" and means "the southern field of Stephan". South refers to Norg. The farm on Asserstraat 78 dates from around 1570. In 1840, it was home to 90 people.
