= Nieuw-Roden =

- Village
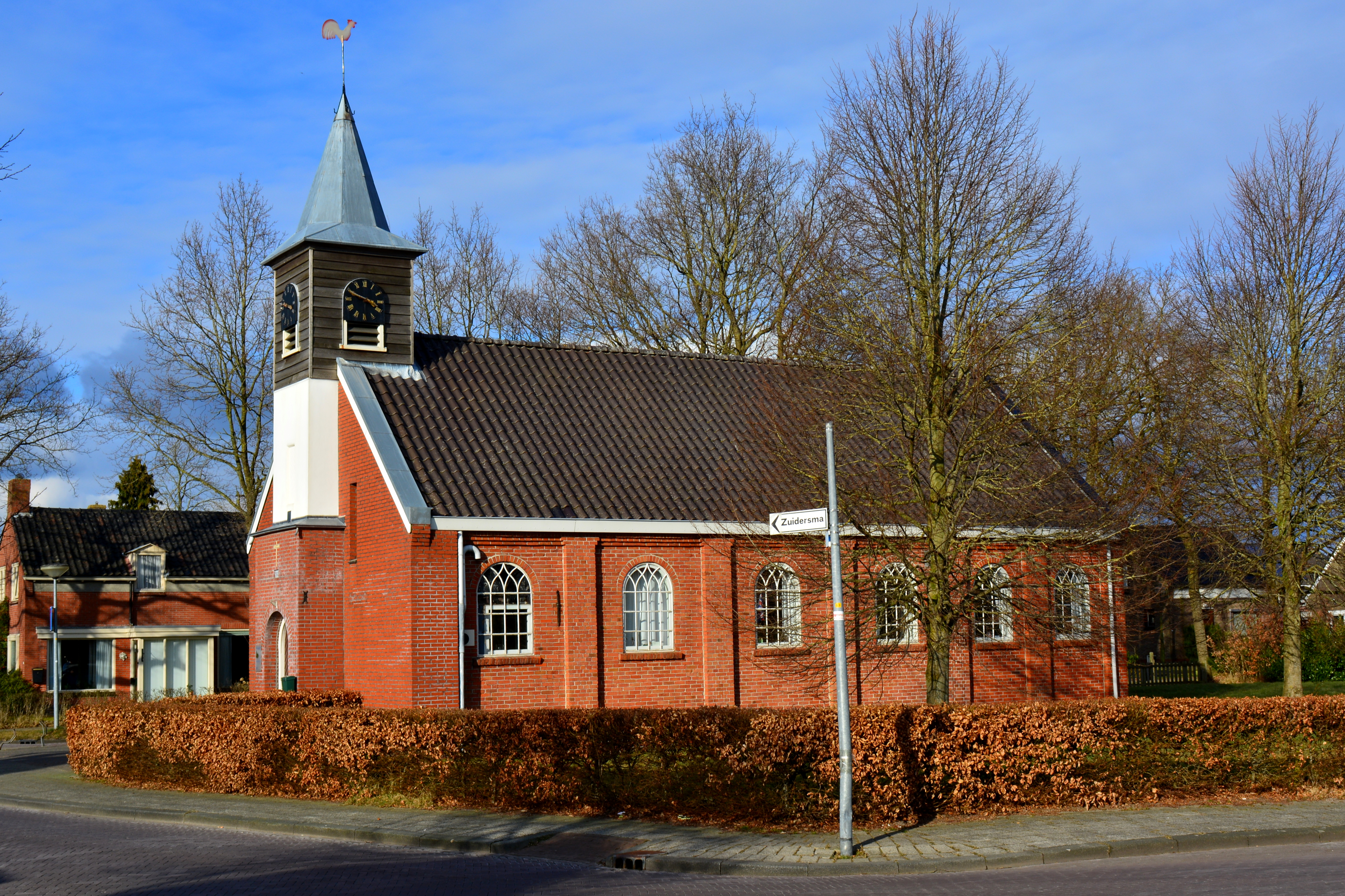
- Church in Nieuw-Roden

- Location in province of Drenthe in the Netherlands Nieuw-Roden (Netherlands)
- Coordinates: 53°7′56″N 6°23′59″E
- Country: Netherlands
- Province: Drenthe
- Municipality: Noordenveld

Area
  - Total: 1.04 km^{2} (0.40 sq mi)
- Elevation: 6 m (20 ft)

Population (2021)
  - Total: 1,260
  - Density: 1,210/km^{2} (3,140/sq mi)
- Time zone: UTC+1 (CET)
  - Summer (DST): UTC+2 (CEST)
- Postal code: 9311
- Dialing code: 050
- Website: dorpsbelangen-nieuwroden.nl

Nieuw-Roden is a village in the Netherlands and is part of the Noordenveld municipality in Drenthe.

During the 19th century, peat to the west of Roden was excavated, and a new settlement appeared. Originally, it contained sod houses which were replaced in the early 20th century. In the 1960s, Huizing built his own sod house, and opened it for visitors in 1965. In the 1990s, it was demolished, due to vandalism. In 1903, a school was built and the church dates from 1922. Nowadays it is a single urban area with Roden but remains a separate village.
