= Een-West =

- Hamlet
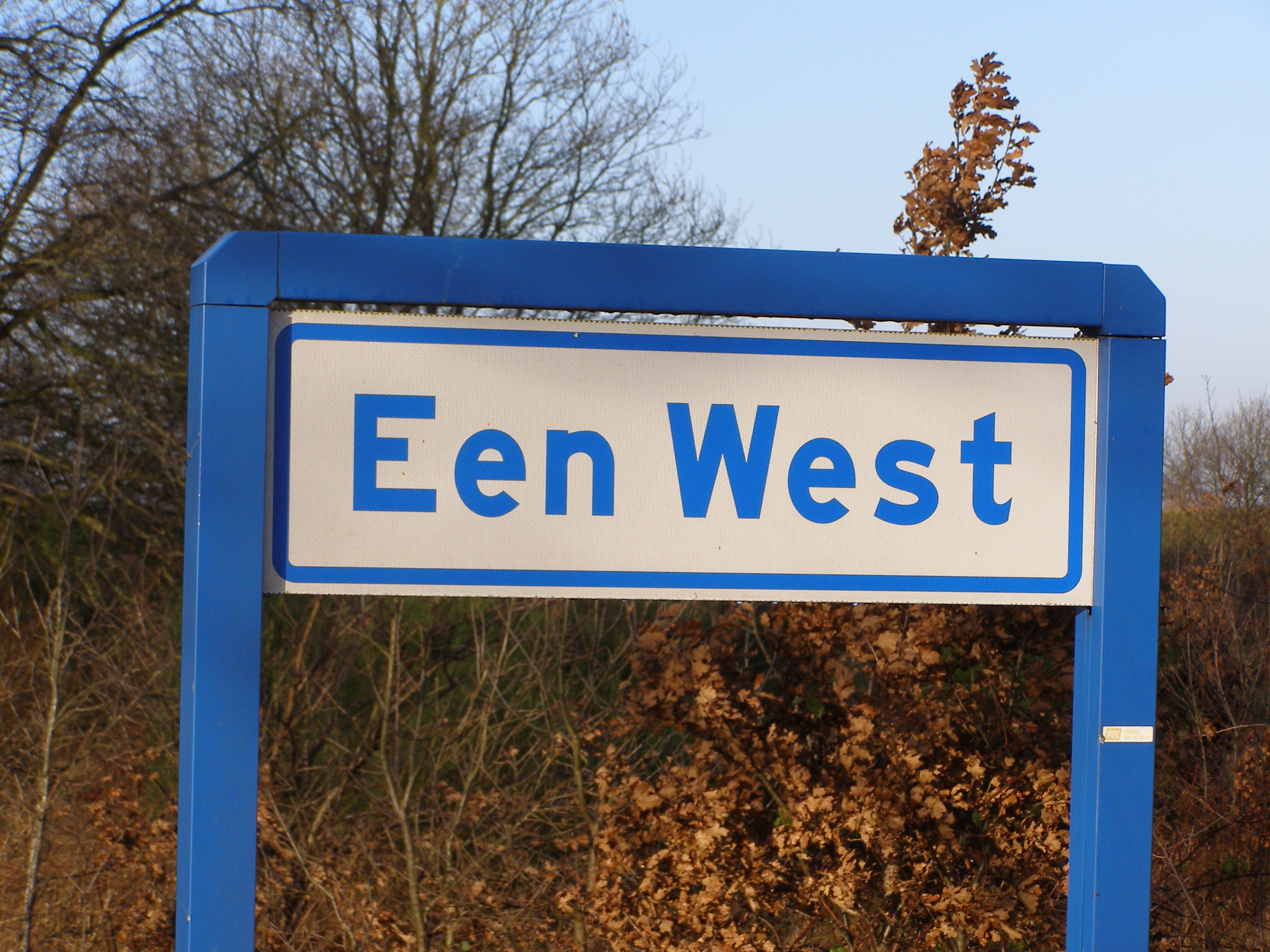
- Een-West

- Location in province of Drenthe in the Netherlands Een-West (Netherlands)
- Coordinates: 53.0846°N 6.3351°E
- Country: Netherlands
- Province: Drenthe
- Municipality: Noordenveld

Area
  - Total: 4.85 km^{2} (1.87 sq mi)
- Elevation: 7 m (23 ft)

Population
  - Total: 220
  - Density: 45/km^{2} (120/sq mi)
- Time zone: UTC+1 (CET)
  - Summer (DST): UTC+2 (CEST)
- Postal code: 9343
- Dialing code: 0516

Een-West is a hamlet in the Netherlands. It is part of the Noordenveld municipality in Drenthe.

Een-West is a statistical entity, and has its own postal code. however it is considered part of Een and outside the build-up area. The area used to be close to uninhabited, but had a strategic value. In 1593, the stadtholder William Louis of Nassau built a sconce at Zwartendijksterschans on road between Friesland and Drenthe through the moorland. Later the sconce deteriorated and the area became part of Drenthe. The sconce was restored in 1980. In 1928, a little church was built in Een-west.

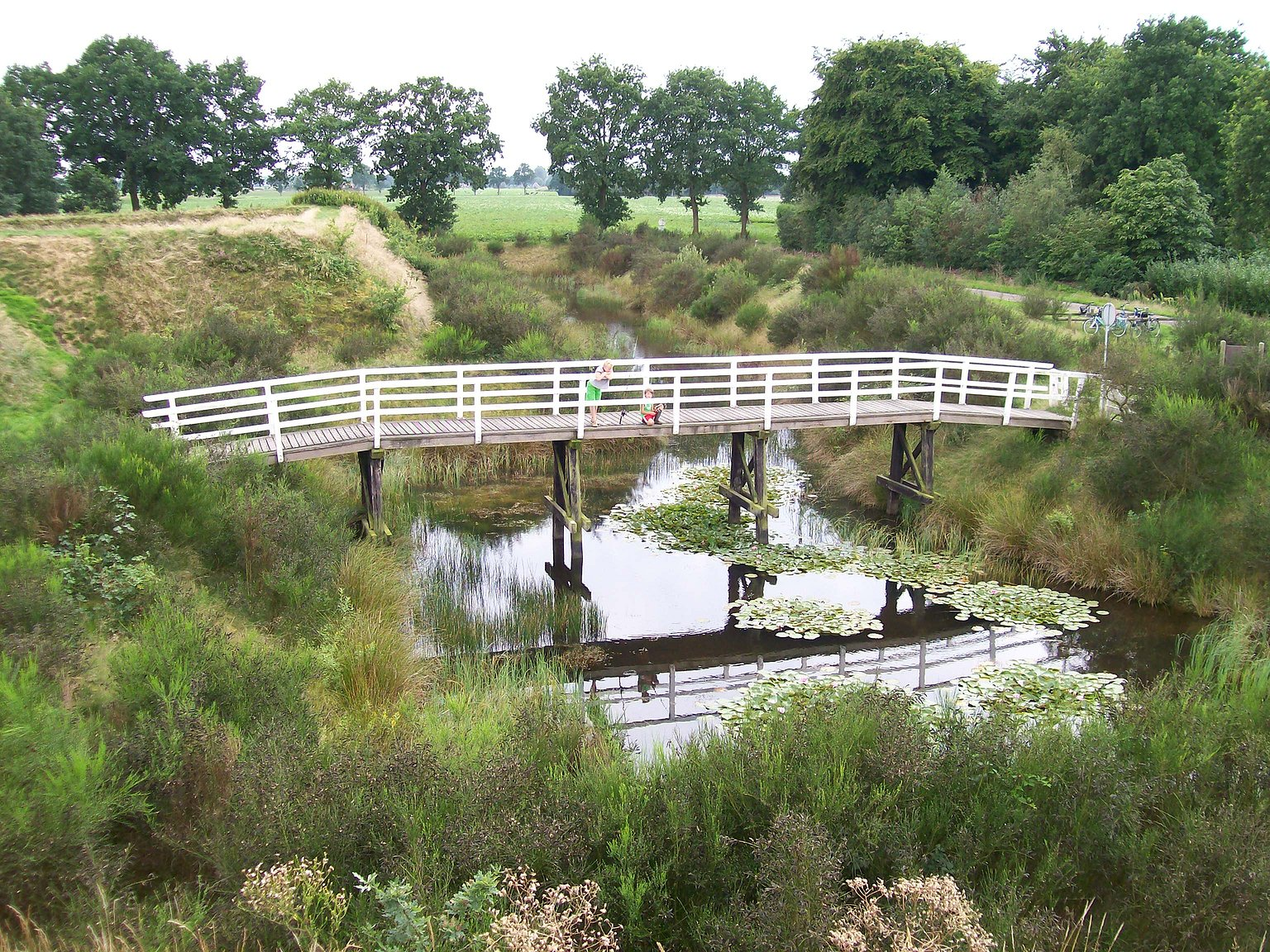
Zwartendijksterschans
