= Peest =

- Village
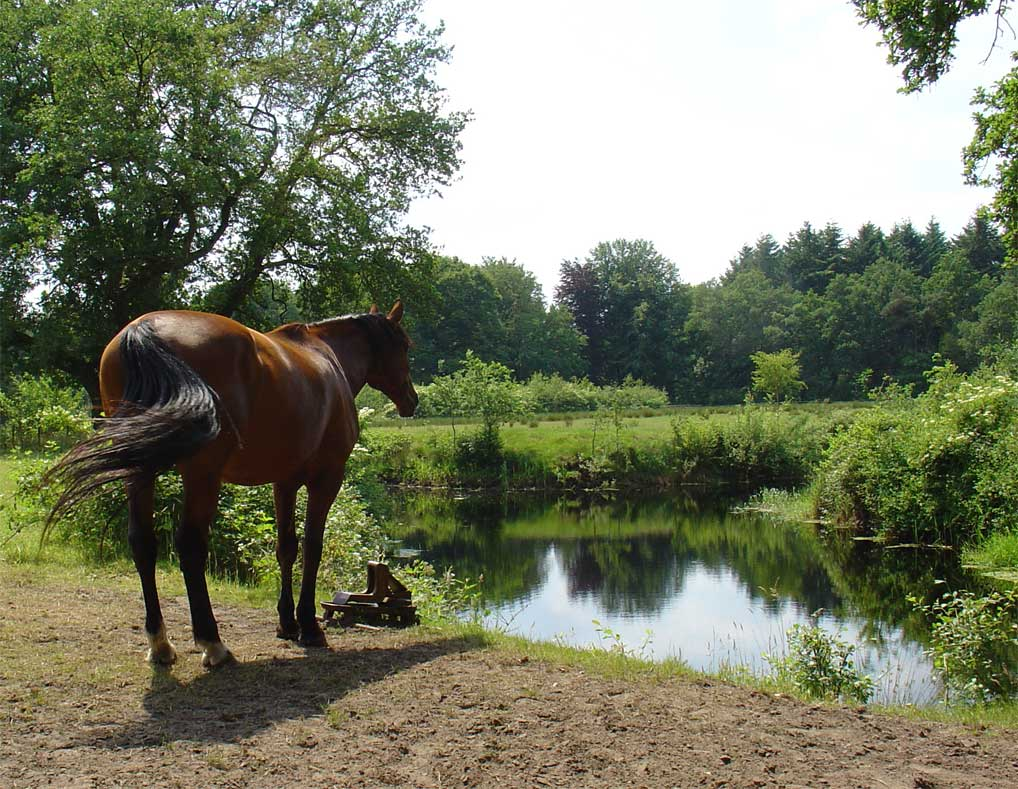
- Westerveen near Peest

- Location in province of Drenthe in the Netherlands Peest (Netherlands)
- Coordinates: 53°3′37″N 6°29′57″E
- Country: Netherlands
- Province: Drenthe
- Municipality: Noordenveld

Area
  - Total: 4.94 km^{2} (1.91 sq mi)
- Elevation: 10 m (33 ft)

Population (2021)
  - Total: 145
  - Density: 29.4/km^{2} (76.0/sq mi)
- Time zone: UTC+1 (CET)
  - Summer (DST): UTC+2 (CEST)
- Postal code: 9334
- Dialing code: 0592

Peest is a village in the Netherlands and it is part of the Noordenveld municipality in Drenthe. The Airport Norg used to be located near the village.

== History ==
Peest is an esdorp which developed around the heath. It was first mentioned around 1300 as "apud Peest". The etymology of the name is unclear. The farms which were constructed prior to 1850 are parallel to the communal pasture while the later farms are at right angles. In 1840, the village had 80 inhabitants.

The hunebed (dolmen) D5 is located of the road to Zeijen.

== Airport Norg ==
In the summer of 1940, the German authorities started to construct Fliegerhorst Norg near Peest. 2,500 workers were brought in to build an airport with three runways on a 280 hectares (690 acres) terrain. The airport suffered from serious drainage problems and was hardly ever used. A large pond was made in the centre to solve the drainage problem, but to no avail. The road around the pond was named Hitlerring.

Even though the airport had operational problems, it was mined in April 1945 by French paratroopers. After the war, the airport was used a dump site for ammunition. Between 1999 and 2011, there was de-fusion operation to remove the 200,000 pieces of ammunition from the site.

The airport seemingly resembles a swastika from the air, however that is a visual illusion. The Germans even painted to roads in order to obscure the airport from view.

== Gallery ==
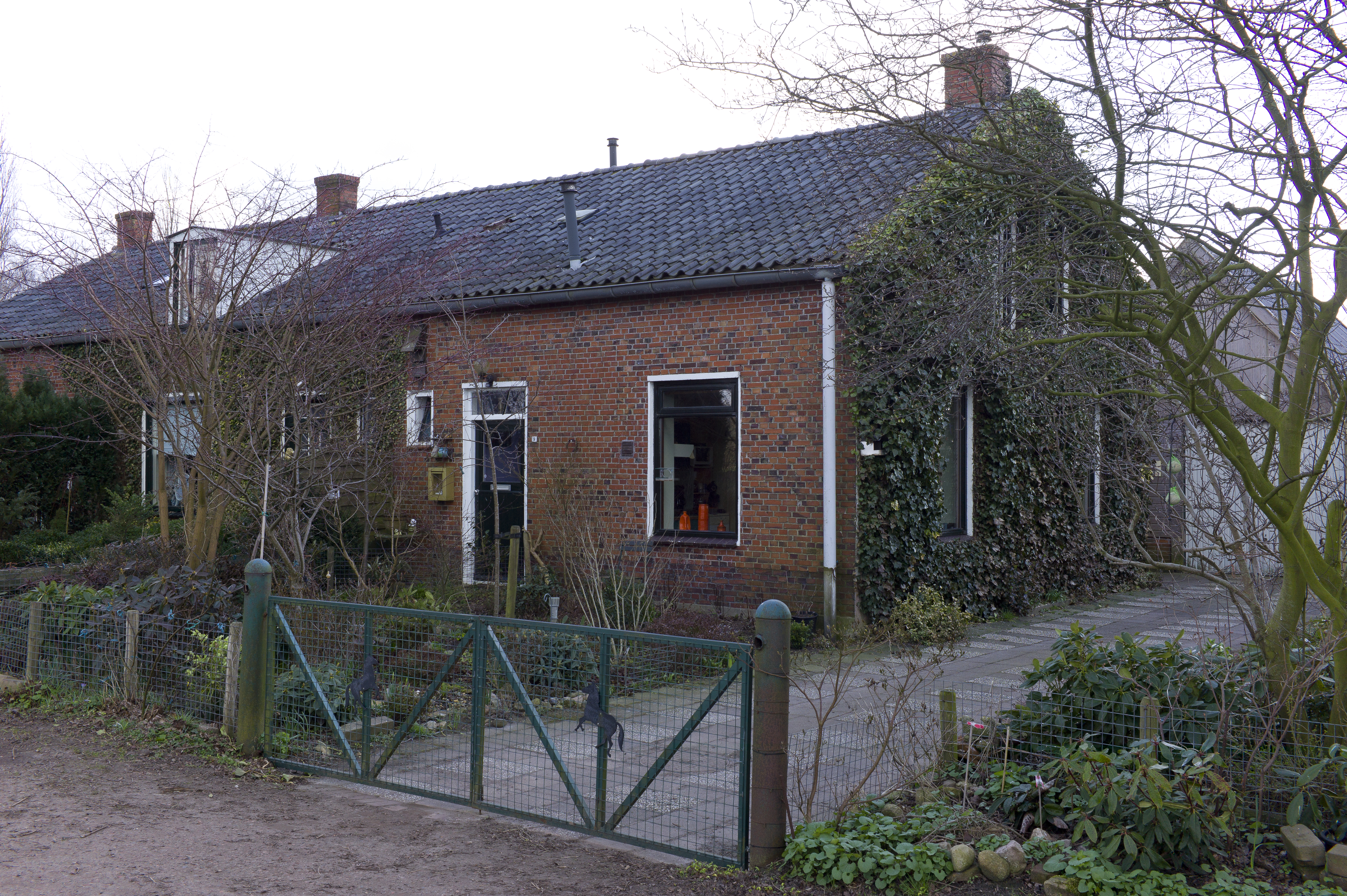
Farm in Peest

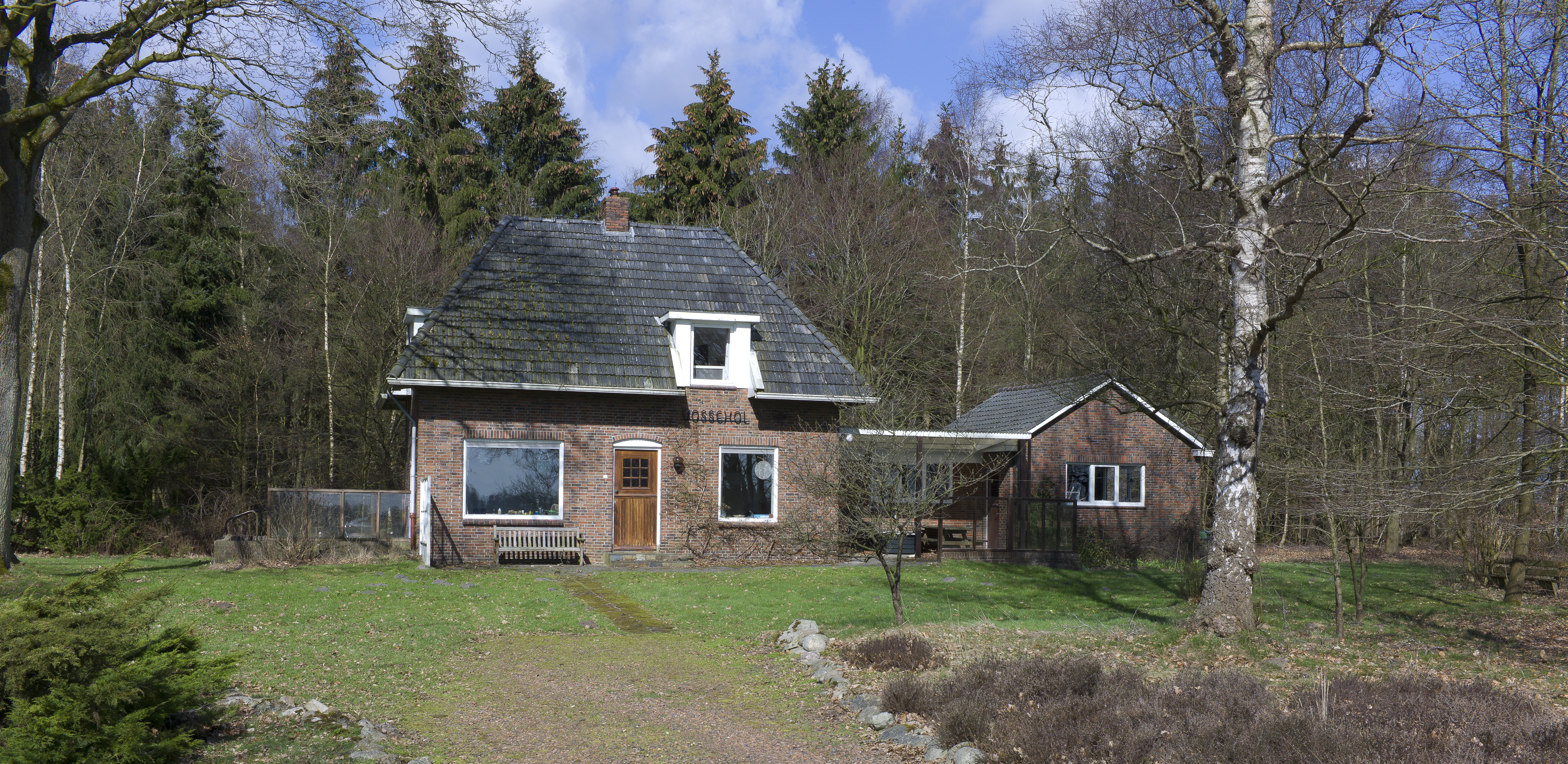
Pumping station for the airstrip

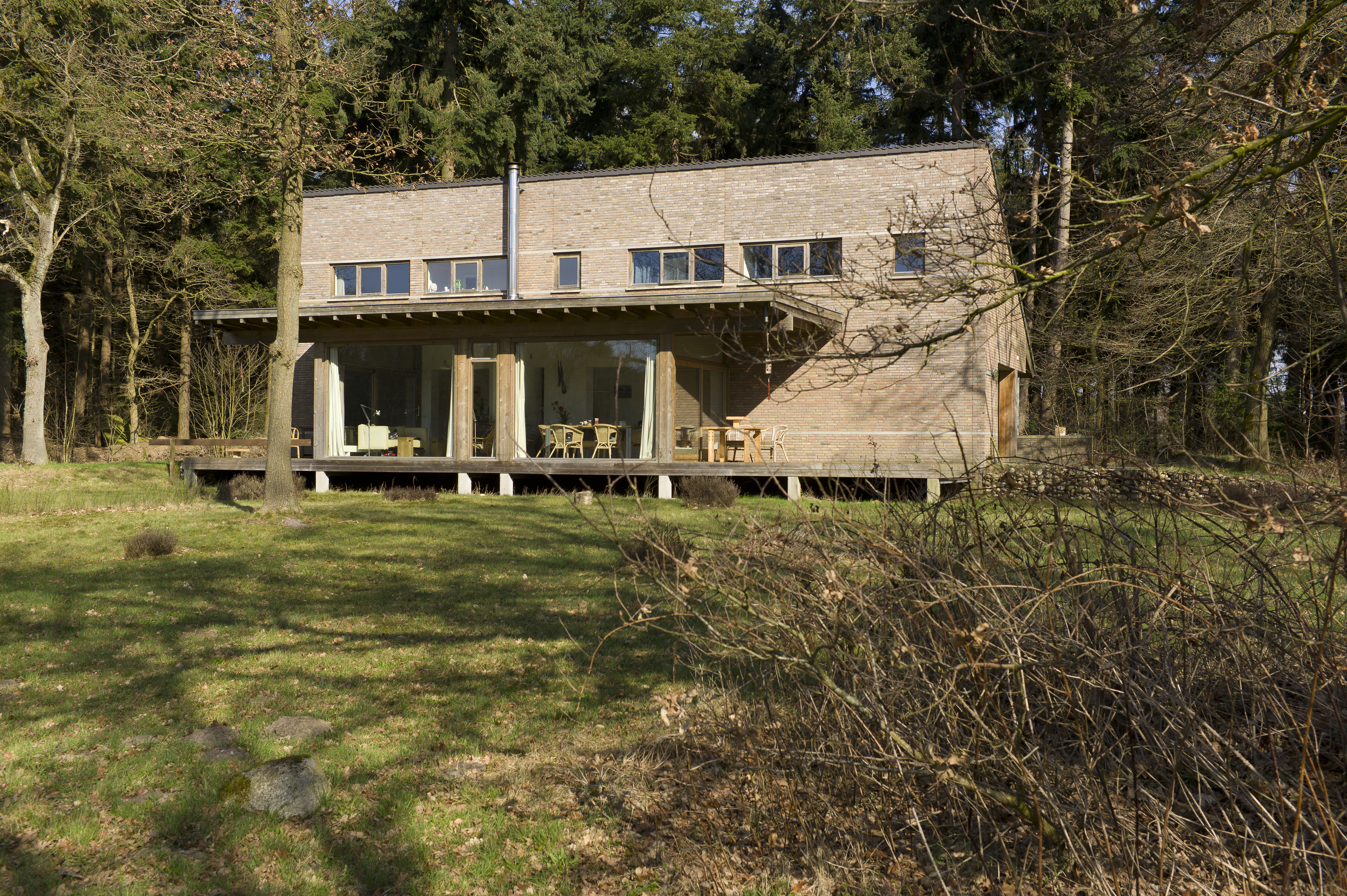
House in Peest

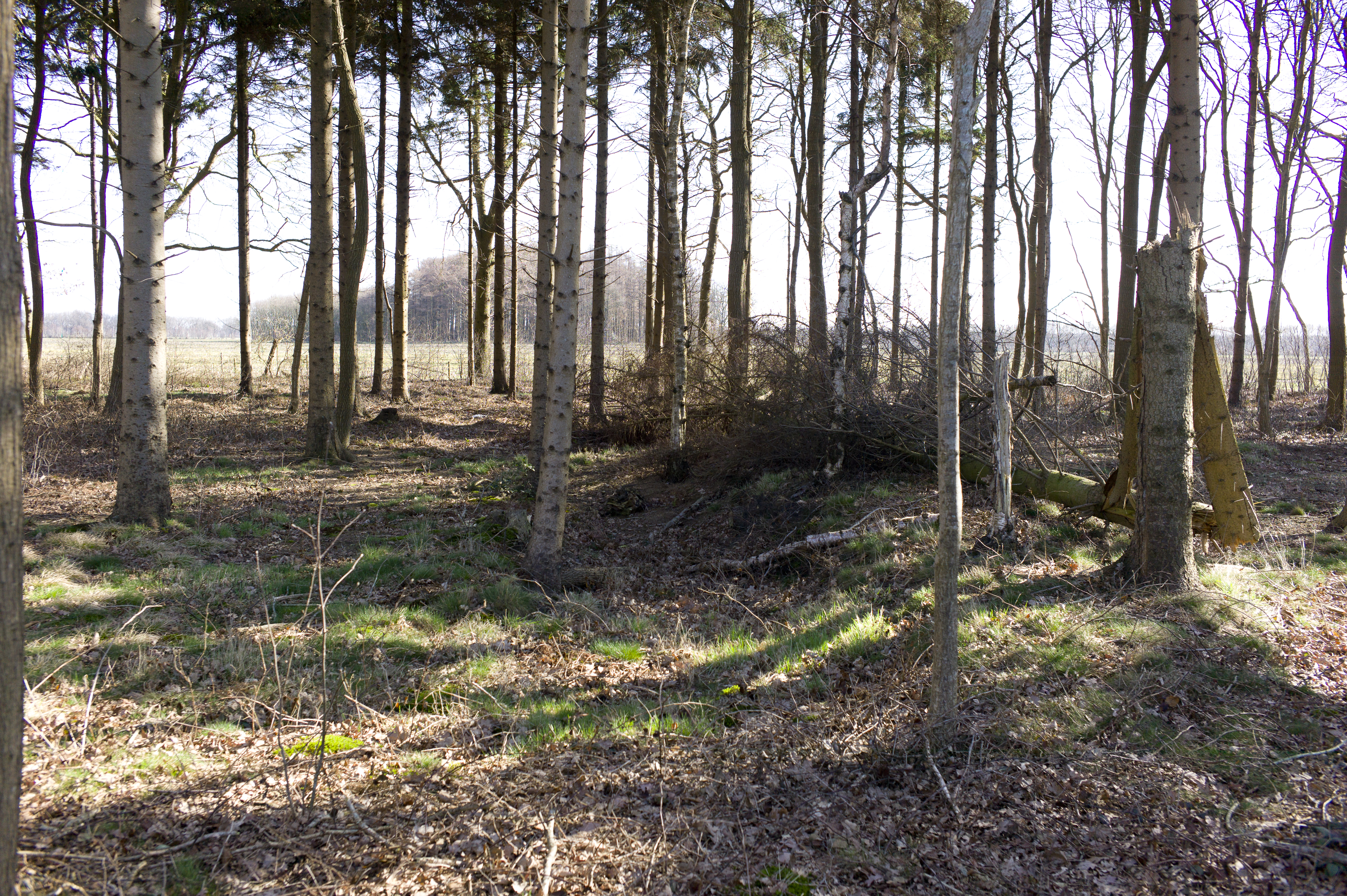
Fuel storage at Airport Norg
