= Leutingewolde =

- Hamlet
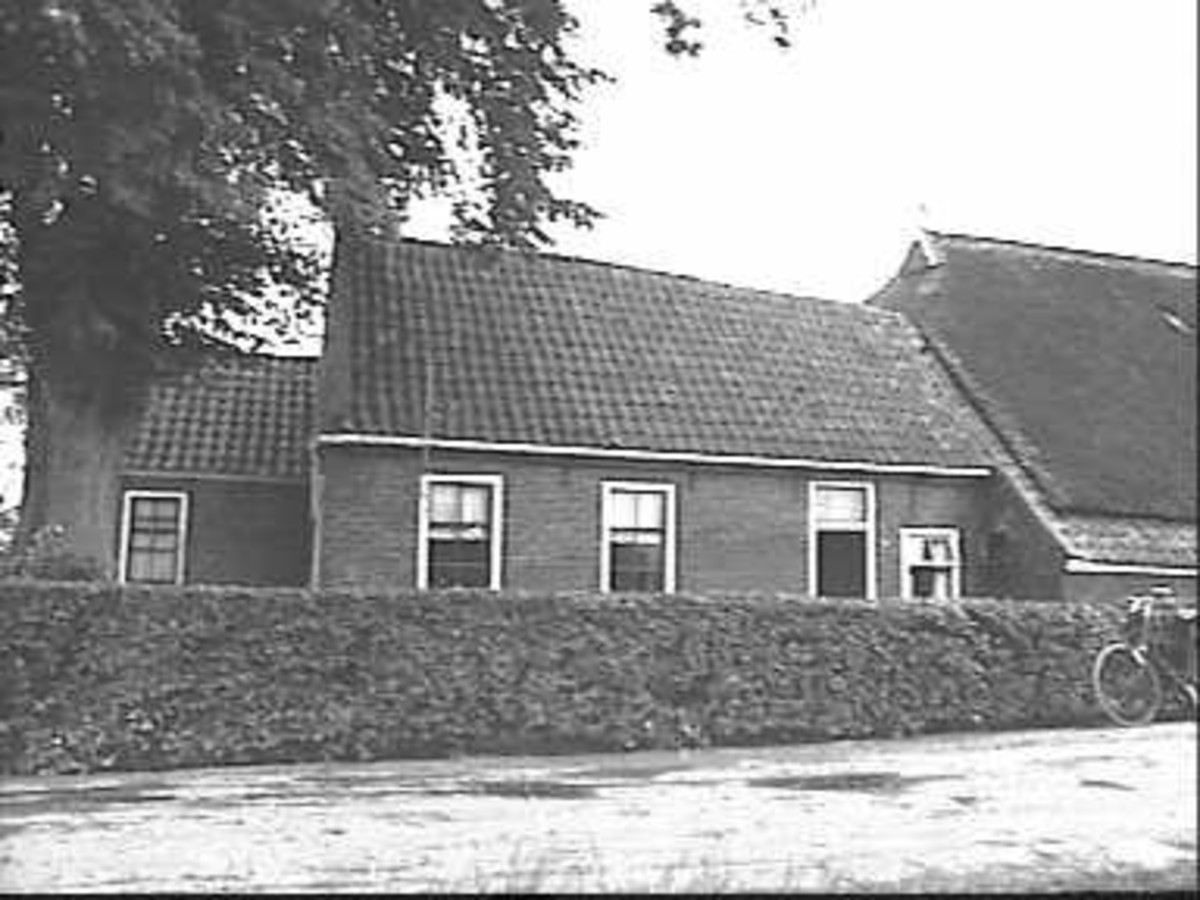
- Farm in Leutingewolde

- Location in province of Drenthe in the Netherlands Leutingewolde (Netherlands)
- Coordinates: 53°9′20″N 6°25′52″E
- Country: Netherlands
- Province: Drenthe
- Municipality: Noordenveld

Area
  - Total: 0.64 km^{2} (0.25 sq mi)
- Elevation: 1 m (3.3 ft)

Population (2021)
  - Total: 125
  - Density: 200/km^{2} (510/sq mi)
- Time zone: UTC+1 (CET)
  - Summer (DST): UTC+2 (CEST)
- Postal code: 9313
- Dialing code: 050

Leutingewolde is a hamlet in the Netherlands and it is part of the Noordenveld municipality in Drenthe.

Leutingewolde is a statistical entity, and has its own postal code. It was first mentioned around 1335 as Lockincwolde and probably means "the forest of people of Luto". The hamlet mainly consists of farms along a road. The population in 1840 was 118 people.
