= Sandebuur =

- Hamlet
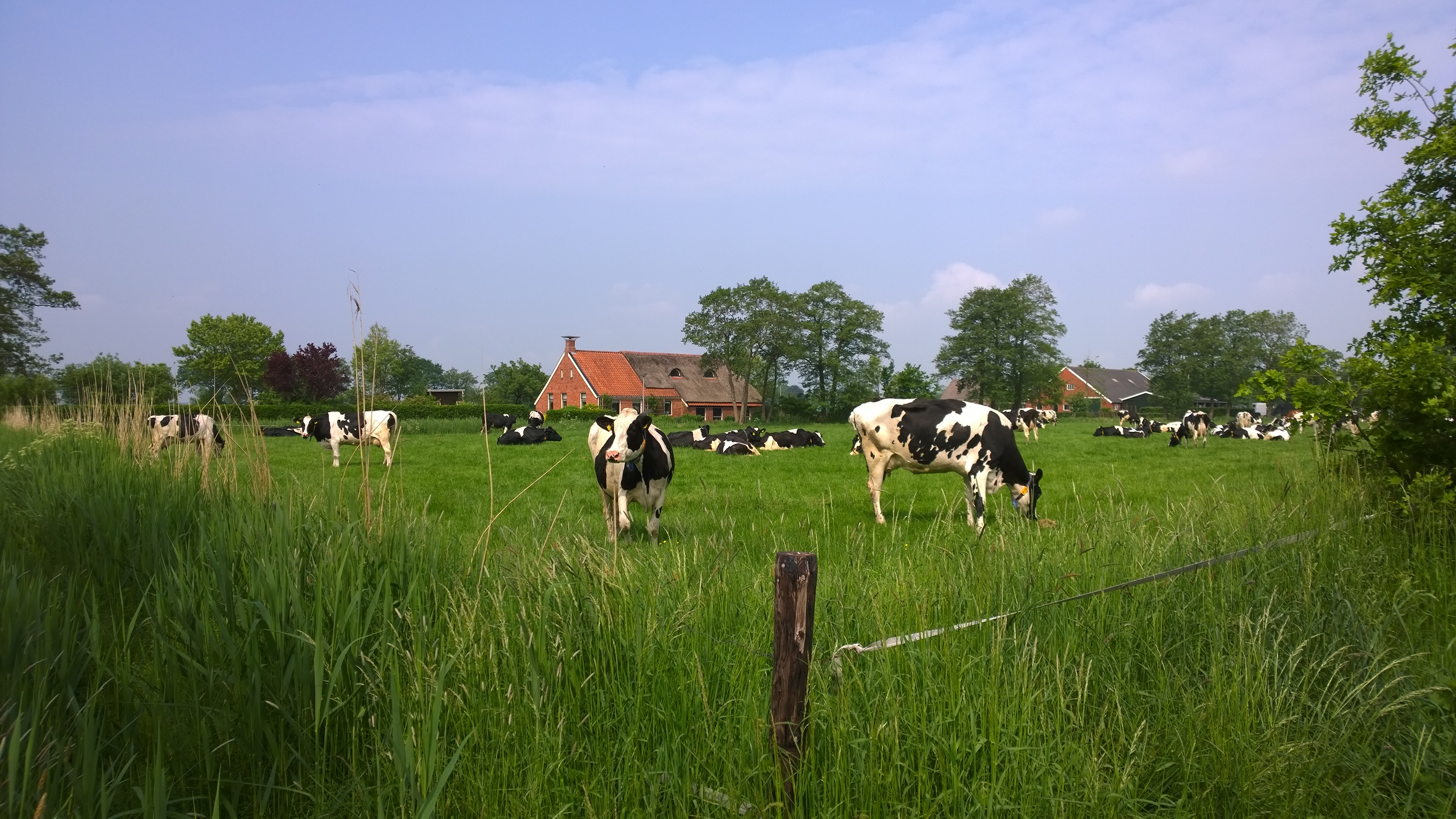
- Cows in Sandebuur

- Location in province of Drenthe in the Netherlands Sandebuur (Netherlands)
- Coordinates: 53°10′19″N 6°27′21″E
- Country: Netherlands
- Province: Drenthe
- Municipality: Noordenveld

Area
  - Total: 0.13 km^{2} (0.050 sq mi)
- Elevation: 1 m (3.3 ft)

Population (2021)
  - Total: 30
  - Density: 230/km^{2} (600/sq mi)
- Time zone: UTC+1 (CET)
  - Summer (DST): UTC+2 (CEST)
- Postal code: 9315
- Dialing code: 050

Sandebuur is a hamlet in the Netherlands and is part of the Noordenveld municipality in Drenthe.

== History ==
Roderwolde is a road village which was established during the early middle ages for the excavation of peat. Due to settling of the soil, most of the village was relocated to higher grounds in the south. Sandebuur is a remnant of the earliest settlement. It was first mentioned in 1781 as Sandbuir and means "neighbourhood on a sandy ground".

Sandebuur is a statistical entity, however the postal authorities have placed it under Roderwolde. The hamlet is outside the build-up area, but is marked with place name signs. In 1840, it was home to 48 people.
