= De Pol =

- Hamlet
- Location in province of Drenthe in the Netherlands De Pol (Netherlands)
- Coordinates: 53°8′25″N 6°30′34″E
- Country: Netherlands
- Province: Drenthe
- Municipality: Noordenveld
- Elevation: 2 m (6.6 ft)
- Time zone: UTC+1 (CET)
  - Summer (DST): UTC+2 (CEST)
- Postal code: 9321
- Dialing code: 050

De Pol is a hamlet in the Netherlands and is part of the Noordenveld municipality in Drenthe.

De Pol is not a statistical entity, and the postal authorities have placed it under Peize. It was first mentioned in 1181 as Hermanno de Polle meaning "the height of Herman". The village is nowadays attached to Peize, but is not signed. In 1870, the population was 180 people. Nowadays it has about 80 houses.
