= Peizerwold =

- Hamlet
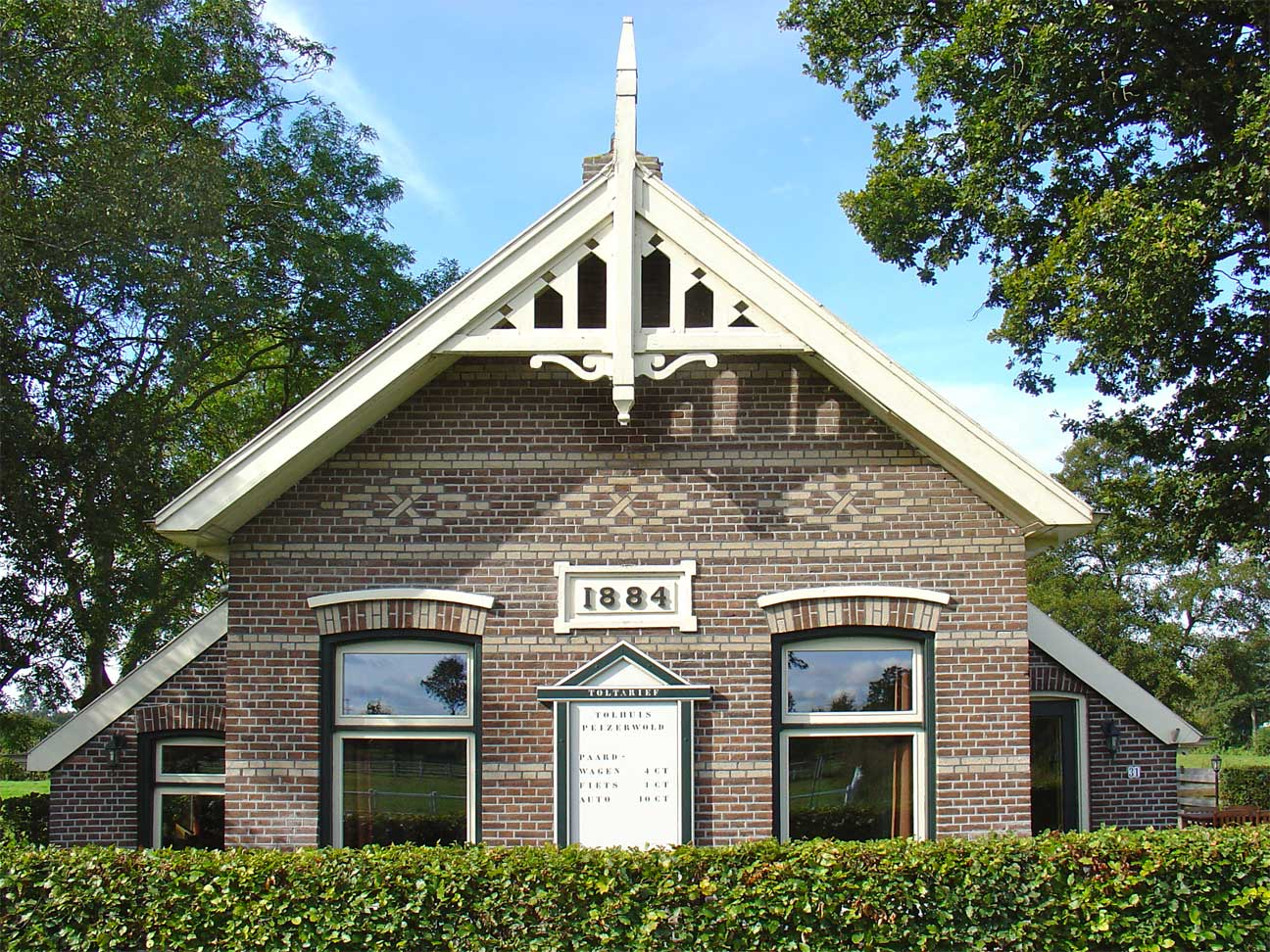
- Toll-house in Peizerwold; The sign reads: horse and wagon: 4 ct; bicycles: 1 ct; cars: 10 ct

- Location in province of Drenthe in the Netherlands Peizerwold (Netherlands)
- Coordinates: 53°9′42″N 6°29′48″E
- Country: Netherlands
- Province: Drenthe
- Municipality: Noordenveld
- Elevation: 2 m (6.6 ft)
- Time zone: UTC+1 (CET)
  - Summer (DST): UTC+2 (CEST)
- Postal code: 9321
- Dialing code: 050

Peizerwold is a hamlet in the Netherlands and it part of the Noordenveld municipality in Drenthe.

== Overview ==
Peizerwold is not a statistical entity, and the postal authorities have placed it under Peize. It was first mentioned in 1792 as Peyswold meaning "the woods near Peize". The hamlet started during the peat exploitation in the forest near Peize. In 1840, it home to 78 people. Nowadays, it has about 20 houses.

The tollhouse dates from 1884, and was built on the road to Groningen. It was later in use a farm, but has been restored as a residential house. It was declared a monument in 1994.

== Gallery ==
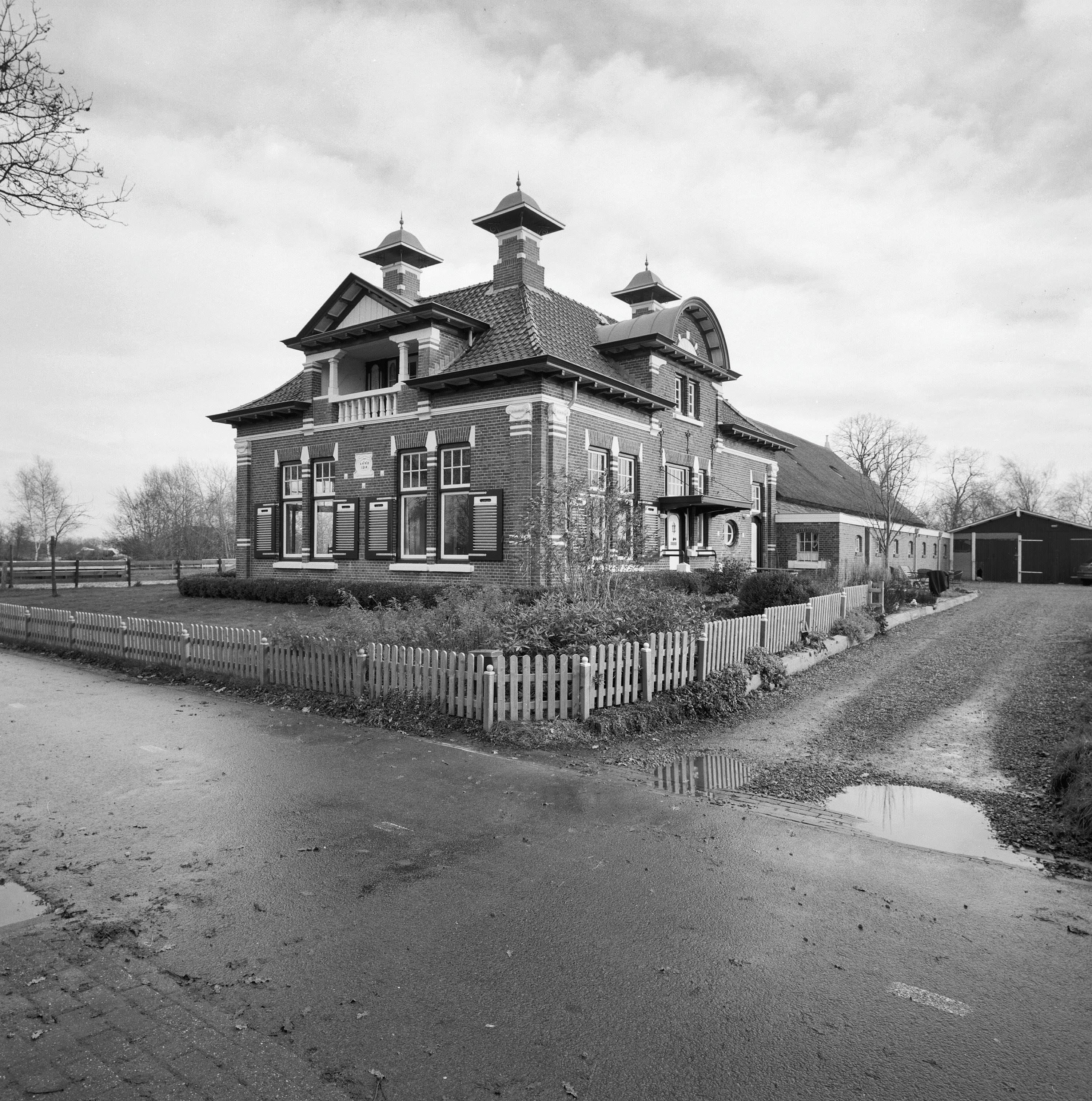
Farm Hoeve Woudrust

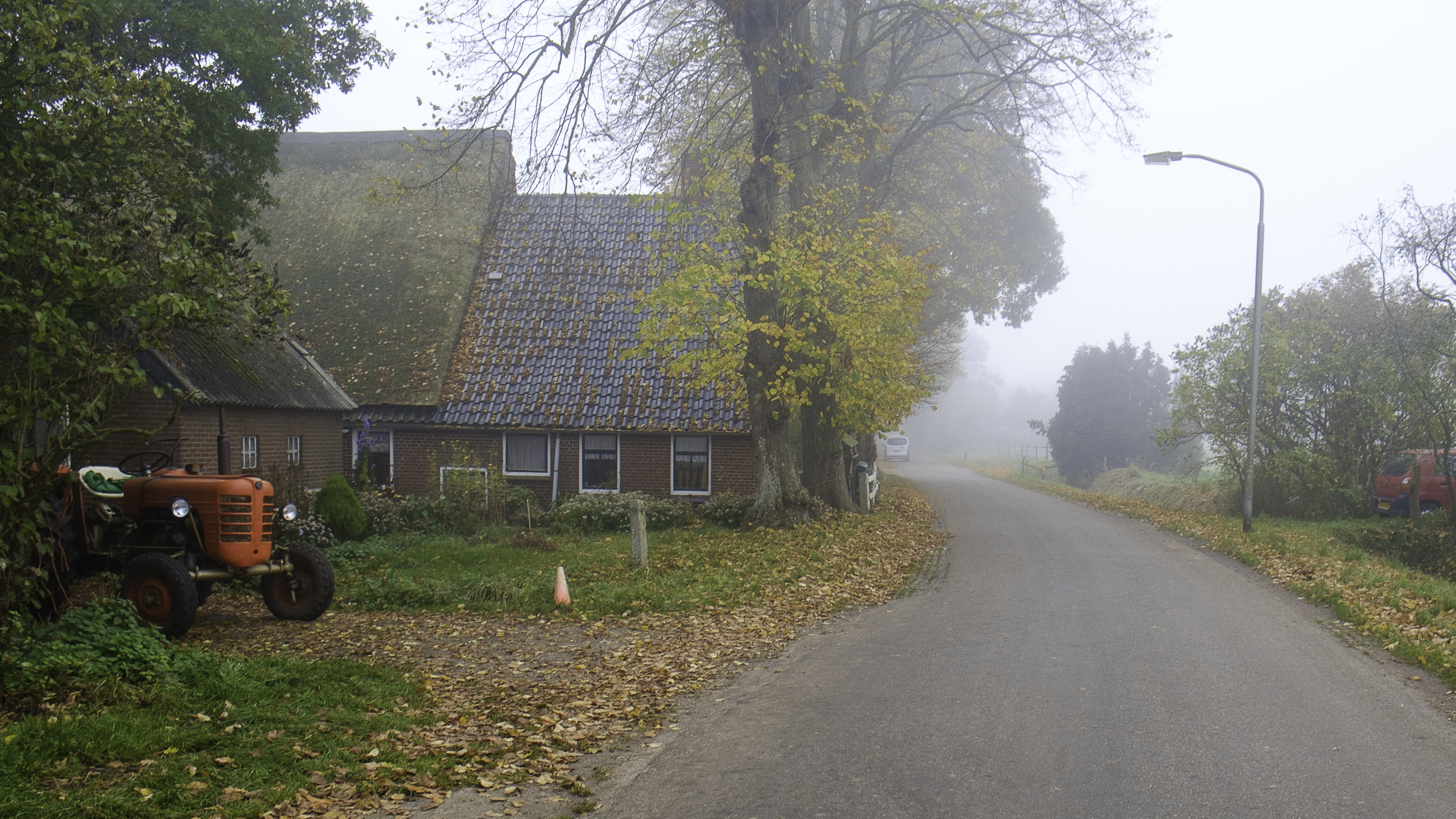
Street view
