= De Horst, Drenthe =

De Horst
- Hamlet
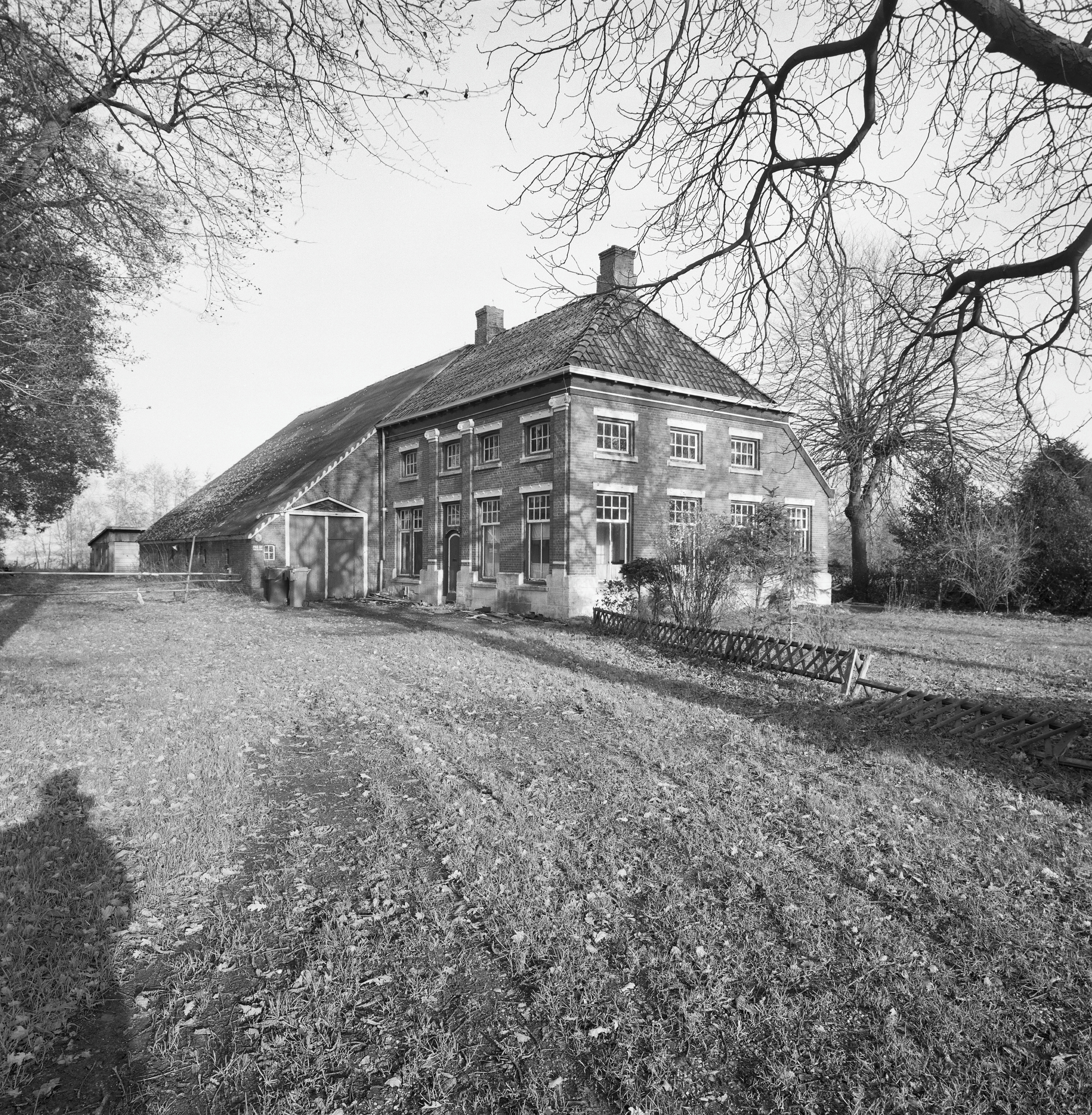
- Farm in de Horst (2000)

- Location in province of Drenthe in the Netherlands De Horst (Netherlands)
- Coordinates: 53.1386°N 6.5298°E
- Country: Netherlands
- Province: Drenthe
- Municipality: Noordenveld
- Elevation: 2 m (6.6 ft)
- Time zone: UTC+1 (CET)
  - Summer (DST): UTC+2 (CEST)
- Postal code: 9321
- Dialing code: 050

De Horst is a hamlet in the Netherlands and it is part of the Noordenveld municipality in Drenthe.

De Horst is not a statistical unit, and has been placed under the postal code for Peize. It contains about 20 houses. It has no place signs, and is indicated by the street signs. It was first mentioned in 1479 as "ter Horst gehieten inden karspele van Peyse" (the settled height in the community of Peize)
