= Huis ter Heide, Drenthe =

Huis ter Heide
- Hamlet
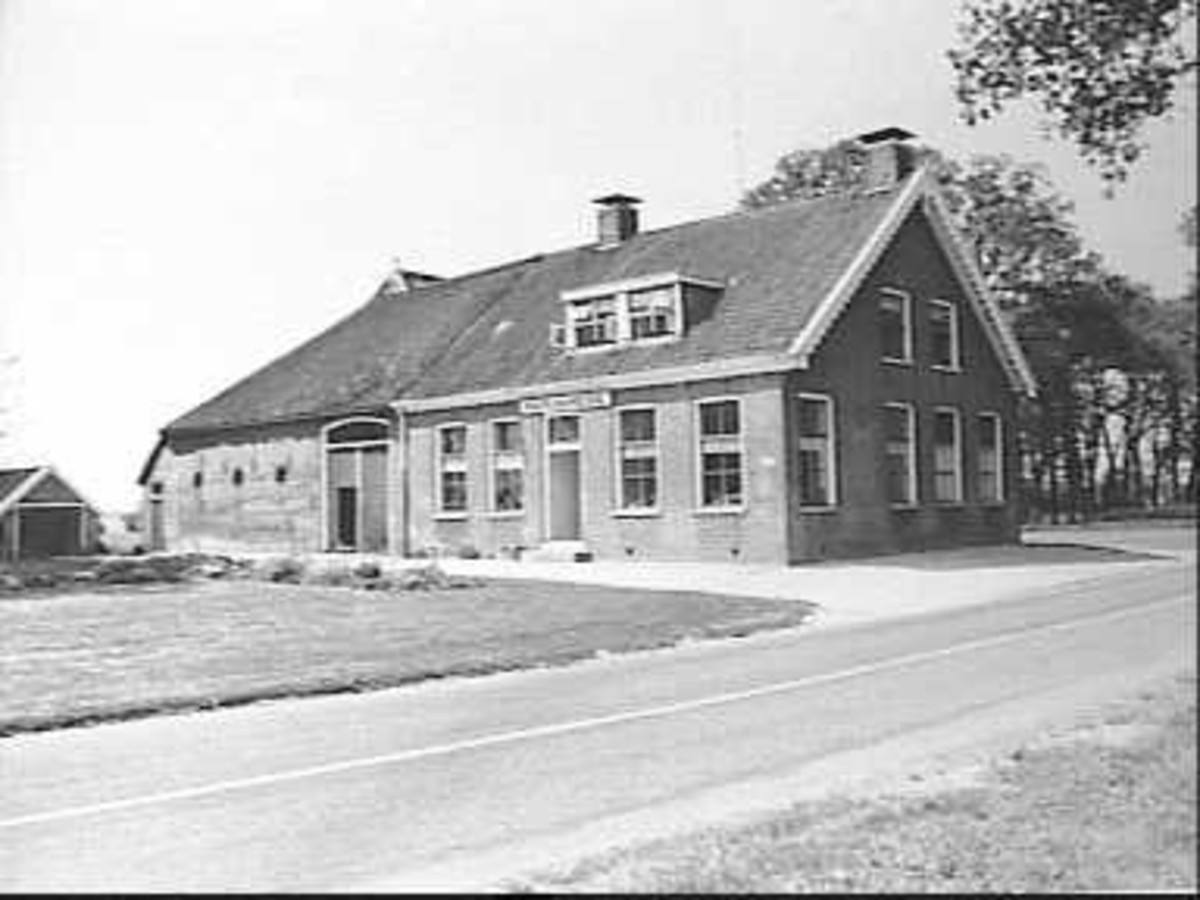
- Huis ter Heide

- Location in province of Drenthe in the Netherlands Huis ter Heide (Netherlands)
- Coordinates: 53.0205°N 6.4814°E
- Country: Netherlands
- Province: Drenthe
- Municipality: Noordenveld

Area
  - Total: 9.84 km^{2} (3.80 sq mi)
- Elevation: 12 m (39 ft)

Population (2021)
  - Total: 130
  - Density: 13/km^{2} (34/sq mi)
- Time zone: UTC+1 (CET)
  - Summer (DST): UTC+2 (CEST)
- Postal code: 9336
- Dialing code: 0592

Huis ter Heide is a hamlet in the Netherlands and is part of the Noordenveld municipality in Drenthe.

Huis ter Helde started as an inn from 1777 near the sluice. During the 18th century, the heath was cultivated and some farms appeared around the inn. In 1840, the population of Huis ter Heide was 40 people. The inn was rebuilt in 1886, and is currently in use as a farm.

On 7 to 8 April 1945, during World War II, 15 Free French paratroopers were dropped in Huis ter Heide as part of Operation Amherst. They had found refugee in farm, but were betrayed. The farm was set on fire, and three soldiers burnt alive. Three others were killed during the fighting. There is a monument for the French paratroopers at Huis ter Heide.
