= List of cities, towns and villages in Drenthe =

This is a list of settlements in the province of Drenthe, in the Netherlands.

| Name | Municipality | Coordinates | |
|---|---|---|---|
| Aalden | Coevorden | 52°47′25″N 6°43′05″E | |
| Achterste Erm | Coevorden | 52°44′35″N 6°49′30″E | |
| Achter 't Hout | Aa en Hunze | 52°59′40″N 6°47′35″E | |
| Altena | Noordenveld | 53°07′55″N 6°28′40″E | |
| Alteveer | De Wolden | 52°40′30″N 6°29′10″E | |
| Alteveer | Noordenveld | 53°06′40″N 6°26′05″E | |
| Alting | Midden-Drenthe | 52°51′55″N 6°32′20″E | |
| Amen | Aa en Hunze | 52°56′35″N 6°36′40″E | |
| Amerika | Noordenveld | 53°05′30″N 6°22′15″E | |
| Amsterdamscheveld | Emmen | 52°41′20″N 6°54′55″E | |
| Anderen | Aa en Hunze | 53°00′00″N 6°41′10″E | |
| Anholt | De Wolden | 52°46′25″N 6°25′00″E | |
| Anloo | Aa en Hunze | 53°02′40″N 6°42′05″E | |
| Annen | Aa en Hunze | 53°03′25″N 6°43′10″E | |
| Annerveenschekanaal | Aa en Hunze | 53°04′40″N 6°48′05″E | |
| Anreep | Assen | 52°58′35″N 6°35′00″E | |
| Ansen | De Wolden | 52°46′50″N 6°20′10″E | |
| Armweide | De Wolden | 52°46′10″N 6°19′15″E | |
| Assen | Assen | 52°59′50″N 6°33′45″E | |
| Balinge | Midden-Drenthe | 52°48′40″N 6°37′45″E | |
| Balloo | Aa en Hunze | 52°59′45″N 6°37′50″E | |
| Barger-Compascuum | Emmen | 52°45′15″N 7°02′35″E | |
| Barger-Erfscheidenveen | Emmen | 52°43′40″N 6°52′05″E | |
| Barger-Oosterveen | Emmen | 52°42′05″N 6°58′20″E | |
| Barger-Oosterveld | Emmen | 52°46′15″N 6°57′30″E | |
| Bazuin | De Wolden | 52°39′15″N 6°24′50″E | |
| Beilen | Midden-Drenthe | 52°51′50″N 6°30′50″E | |
| Beilervaart | Midden-Drenthe | 52°52′00″N 6°27′10″E | |
| Benderse | De Wolden | 52°46′45″N 6°22′05″E | |
| Berghuizen | De Wolden | 52°42′50″N 6°17′25″E | |
| Blijdenstein | De Wolden | 52°42′45″N 6°15′00″E | |
| Bloemberg | De Wolden | 52°39′05″N 6°21′10″E | |
| Boerlaan | Noordenveld | 53°07′55″N 6°29′30″E | |
| Boermastreek | Borger-Odoorn | 52°53′15″N 6°54′05″E | |
| Bonnen | Aa en Hunze | 53°00′20″N 6°46′40″E | |
| Bonnerveen | Aa en Hunze | 53°00′50″N 6°49′55″E | |
| Borger | Borger-Odoorn | 52°55′25″N 6°47′35″E | |
| Bosje | Aa en Hunze | 53°01′25″N 6°52′05″E | |
| Boterveen | Westerveld | 52°51′50″N 6°23′10″E | |
| Bovensmilde | Midden-Drenthe | 52°58′35″N 6°28′55″E | |
| Bovenstreek | Aa en Hunze | 53°01′25″N 6°51′15″E | |
| Broekhuizen | Meppel | 52°41′40″N 6°16′00″E | |
| Bronneger | Borger-Odoorn | 52°56′45″N 6°48′55″E | |
| Bronnegerveen | Borger-Odoorn | 52°57′20″N 6°50′15″E | |
| Brunsting | Midden-Drenthe | 52°52′15″N 6°29′20″E | |
| Bruntinge | Midden-Drenthe | 52°49′00″N 6°35′00″E | |
| Buinen | Borger-Odoorn | 52°55′50″N 6°50′10″E | |
| Buinerveen | Borger-Odoorn | 52°56′10″N 6°52′45″E | |
| Buitenhuizen | De Wolden | 52°42′55″N 6°15′10″E | |
| Bunne | Tynaarlo | 53°07′05″N 6°32′00″E | |
| Busselte | Westerveld | 52°45′55″N 6°11′50″E | |
| Coevorden | Coevorden | 52°39′45″N 6°44′30″E | |
| Dalen | Coevorden | 52°41′55″N 6°45′20″E | |
| Dalerpeel | Coevorden | 52°40′50″N 6°39′35″E | |
| Dalerveen | Coevorden | 52°41′30″N 6°48′40″E | |
| Darp | Westerveld | 52°46′30″N 6°12′15″E | |
| De Bente | Coevorden | 52°41′25″N 6°45′15″E | |
| De Groeve | Tynaarlo | 53°06′50″N 6°42′55″E | |
| De Haar | Hoogeveen | 52°45′40″N 6°32′55″E | |
| De Haar | Assen | 52°58′00″N 6°32′05″E | |
| De Hilte | Aa en Hunze | 53°02′15″N 6°49′45″E | |
| De Kiel | Coevorden | 52°51′50″N 6°44′55″E | |
| De Klosse | Meppel | 52°44′25″N 6°07′50″E | |
| De Kolk | Meppel | 52°42′40″N 6°08′45″E | |
| De Mars | Coevorden | 52°42′20″N 6°44′05″E | |
| De Pol | Noordenveld | 53°08′20″N 6°30′45″E | |
| De Punt | Tynaarlo | 53°07′00″N 6°36′10″E | |
| De Schiphorst | Meppel | 52°40′55″N 6°15′00″E | |
| De Stapel | De Wolden | 52°39′50″N 6°20′00″E | |
| De Stuw | De Wolden | 52°41′25″N 6°25′20″E | |
| Deurze | Aa en Hunze | 52°59′05″N 6°36′35″E | |
| De Wijk | De Wolden | 52°40′25″N 6°17′25″E | |
| Diever | Westerveld | 52°51′15″N 6°19′05″E | |
| Dieverbrug | Westerveld | 52°50′50″N 6°20′30″E | |
| Dikbroeken | Borger-Odoorn | 52°52′20″N 7°00′00″E | |
| Diphoorn | Coevorden | 52°46′15″N 6°49′10″E | |
| Doldersum | Westerveld | 52°53′10″N 6°14′40″E | |
| Donderen | Tynaarlo | 53°05′45″N 6°32′45″E | |
| Drijber | Midden-Drenthe | 52°47′30″N 6°32′20″E | |
| Drogt | De Wolden | 52°39′35″N 6°24′25″E | |
| Drogteropslagen | De Wolden | 52°37′20″N 6°29′55″E | |
| Drouwen | Borger-Odoorn | 52°57′10″N 6°47′45″E | |
| Drouwenermond | Borger-Odoorn | 52°58′45″N 6°54′20″E | |
| Drouwenerveen | Borger-Odoorn | 52°58′10″N 6°51′00″E | |
| Dwingeloo | Westerveld | 52°50′05″N 6°22′10″E | |
| Echten | De Wolden | 52°42′40″N 6°23′50″E | |
| Eelde | Tynaarlo | 53°08′10″N 6°33′45″E | |
| Eelderwolde | Tynaarlo | 53°10′35″N 6°32′35″E | |
| Eemster | Westerveld | 52°51′10″N 6°23′00″E | |
| Eemten | De Wolden | 52°40′20″N 6°19′45″E | |
| Een | Noordenveld | 53°04′35″N 6°23′45″E | |
| Een-West | Noordenveld | 53°05′05″N 6°20′20″E | |
| Eerste Exloërmond | Borger-Odoorn | 52°56′05″N 6°56′10″E | |
| Ees | Borger-Odoorn | 52°54′30″N 6°48′20″E | |
| Eesergroen | Borger-Odoorn | 52°53′25″N 6°46′45″E | |
| Eeserveen | Borger-Odoorn | 52°52′00″N 6°45′55″E | |
| Eext | Aa en Hunze | 53°01′05″N 6°44′05″E | |
| Eexterveen | Aa en Hunze | 53°03′15″N 6°48′10″E | |
| Eexterveenschekanaal | Aa en Hunze | 53°03′20″N 6°50′15″E | |
| Eexterzandvoort | Aa en Hunze | 53°02′05″N 6°47′05″E | |
| Ekehaar | Aa en Hunze | 52°57′10″N 6°36′10″E | |
| Eldersloo | Aa en Hunze | 52°57′55″N 6°37′05″E | |
| Eleveld | Aa en Hunze | 52°57′25″N 6°34′50″E | |
| Elim | Hoogeveen | 52°40′50″N 6°34′50″E | |
| Ellertshaar | Borger-Odoorn | 52°53′35″N 6°44′15″E | |
| Elp | Midden-Drenthe | 52°52′55″N 6°38′45″E | |
| Emmen | Emmen | 52°46′45″N 6°54′25″E | |
| Emmer-Compascuum | Emmen | 52°48′40″N 7°02′50″E | |
| Emmer-Erfscheidenveen | Emmen | 52°48′25″N 6°59′20″E | |
| Emmerschans | Emmen | 52°48′05″N 6°56′20″E | |
| Erica | Emmen | 52°42′50″N 6°55′35″E | |
| Erm | Coevorden | 52°45′20″N 6°49′00″E | |
| Ermerveen | Emmen | 52°44′10″N 6°50′35″E | |
| Eursinge | Midden-Drenthe | 52°50′15″N 6°36′25″E | |
| Eursinge | Westerveld | 52°46′00″N 6°13′15″E | |
| Eursinge | De Wolden | 52°46′40″N 6°26′40″E | |
| Exloërkijl | Borger-Odoorn | 52°53′25″N 6°55′50″E | |
| Exloërveen | Borger-Odoorn | 52°54′25″N 6°54′30″E | |
| Exloo | Borger-Odoorn | 52°52′55″N 6°51′50″E | |
| Fluitenberg | Hoogeveen | 52°44′10″N 6°27′15″E | |
| Fort | De Wolden | 52°39′05″N 6°23′10″E | |
| Foxwolde | Noordenveld | 53°09′35″N 6°27′35″E | |
| Frederiksoord | Westerveld | 52°50′30″N 6°10′35″E | |
| Garminge | Midden-Drenthe | 52°49′10″N 6°37′30″E | |
| Gasselte | Aa en Hunze | 52°58′20″N 6°47′40″E | |
| Gasselterboerveen | Aa en Hunze | 52°59′55″N 6°50′35″E | |
| Gasselterboerveenschemond | Aa en Hunze | 53°00′25″N 6°52′50″E | |
| Gasselternijveen | Aa en Hunze | 52°59′20″N 6°51′10″E | |
| Gasselternijveenschemond Eerste Dwarsdiep | Aa en Hunze | 53°00′00″N 6°55′25″E | |
| Gasselternijveenschemond Tweede Dwarsdiep | Aa en Hunze | 52°59′50″N 6°53′45″E | |
| Gasteren | Aa en Hunze | 53°02′05″N 6°39′50″E | |
| Geelbroek | Aa en Hunze | 52°57′05″N 6°34′25″E | |
| Gees | Coevorden | 52°44′50″N 6°50′20″E | |
| Geesbrug | Coevorden | 52°43′35″N 6°38′00″E | |
| Geeuwenbrug | Westerveld | 52°52′15″N 6°22′20″E | |
| Gieten | Aa en Hunze | 53°00′15″N 6°45′50″E | |
| Gieterveen | Aa en Hunze | 53°01′40″N 6°50′15″E | |
| Gieterzandvoort | Aa en Hunze | 53°01′45″N 6°48′05″E | |
| Gijsselte | De Wolden | 52°45′05″N 6°24′40″E | |
| Graswijk | Assen | 52°58′00″N 6°33′15″E | |
| Grevenberg | Coevorden | 52°44′25″N 6°44′40″E | |
| Grolloo | Aa en Hunze | 52°56′05″N 6°40′20″E | |
| Haakswold | De Wolden | 52°43′05″N 6°13′55″E | |
| Haalweide | De Wolden | 52°40′20″N 6°18′50″E | |
| Havelte | Westerveld | 52°46′25″N 6°14′10″E | |
| Havelterberg | Westerveld | 52°46′30″N 6°10′55″E | |
| Hees | De Wolden | 52°44′55″N 6°22′00″E | |
| Het Moer | Westerveld | 52°49′55″N 6°16′30″E | |
| Het Schier | Westerveld | 52°47′20″N 6°12′45″E | |
| Hijken | Midden-Drenthe | 52°53′40″N 6°29′50″E | |
| Hijkersmilde | Midden-Drenthe | 52°55′45″N 6°25′20″E | |
| Hoge Linthorst | De Wolden | 52°41′15″N 6°19′00″E | |
| Hollandscheveld | Hoogeveen | 52°42′20″N 6°32′20″E | |
| Holsloot | Coevorden | 52°43′40″N 6°48′10″E | |
| Holthe | Midden-Drenthe | 52°50′35″N 6°32′20″E | |
| Holtien | Westerveld | 52°50′50″N 6°23′50″E | |
| Holtinge | Westerveld | 52°47′45″N 6°15′05″E | |
| Holtland | Westerveld | 52°50′35″N 6°20′50″E | |
| Hoogehaar | Coevorden | 52°40′45″N 6°42′55″E | |
| Hoogersmilde | Midden-Drenthe | 52°54′20″N 6°23′40″E | |
| Hoogeveen | Hoogeveen | 52°43′20″N 6°28′35″E | |
| Hooghalen | Midden-Drenthe | 52°55′15″N 6°32′20″E | |
| Huis ter Heide | Noordenveld | 53°01′15″N 6°28′55″E | |
| Kalenberg | Hoogeveen | 52°44′20″N 6°26′20″E | |
| Kalteren | Westerveld | 52°51′15″N 6°17′45″E | |
| Kavelingen | Borger-Odoorn | 52°54′50″N 7°00′40″E | |
| Kerkenveld | De Wolden | 52°40′05″N 6°30′00″E | |
| Kibbelveen | Coevorden | 52°49′20″N 6°48′30″E | |
| Klatering | Midden-Drenthe | 52°52′20″N 6°32′35″E | |
| Klazienaveen | Emmen | 52°43′25″N 6°59′25″E | |
| Klazienaveen-Noord | Emmen | 52°46′20″N 7°00′10″E | |
| Klijndijk | Borger-Odoorn | 52°49′55″N 6°51′35″E | |
| Klooster | Coevorden | 52°39′15″N 6°42′55″E | |
| Kloosterveen | Assen | 52°59′45″N 6°30′50″E | |
| Koekange | De Wolden | 52°41′55″N 6°19′00″E | |
| Koekangerveld | De Wolden | 52°42′55″N 6°20′05″E | |
| Koelveen | Emmen | 52°39′20″N 6°56′20″E | |
| Kolderveen | Meppel | 52°43′20″N 6°09′05″E | |
| Kolderveense Bovenboer | Meppel | 52°44′40″N 6°09′10″E | |
| Kostvlies | Aa en Hunze | 52°59′15″N 6°47′55″E | |
| Kraloo | De Wolden | 52°47′05″N 6°26′00″E | |
| Kraloo | De Wolden | 52°42′35″N 6°14′45″E | |
| Laaghalen | Midden-Drenthe | 52°55′20″N 6°31′50″E | |
| Laaghalerveen | Midden-Drenthe | 52°56′25″N 6°30′40″E | |
| Langelo | Noordenveld | 53°05′35″N 6°26′45″E | |
| Leeuwte | De Wolden | 52°46′00″N 6°23′55″E | |
| Leggeloo | Westerveld | 52°51′25″N 6°21′40″E | |
| Leutingewolde | Noordenveld | 53°09′30″N 6°25′55″E | |
| Lhee | Westerveld | 52°49′35″N 6°23′40″E | |
| Lheebroek | Westerveld | 52°50′45″N 6°25′35″E | |
| Lieveren | Noordenveld | 53°06′55″N 6°27′10″E | |
| Lieving | Midden-Drenthe | 52°51′05″N 6°31′40″E | |
| Linde | De Wolden | 52°38′20″N 6°26′55″E | |
| Loon | Assen | 53°00′50″N 6°36′45″E | |
| Lubbinge | De Wolden | 52°41′25″N 6°25′50″E | |
| Lunssloten | De Wolden | 52°41′55″N 6°24′55″E | |
| Makkum | Midden-Drenthe | 52°50′55″N 6°32′10″E | |
| Mantinge | Midden-Drenthe | 52°48′15″N 6°36′55″E | |
| Marwijksoord | Aa en Hunze | 52°57′40″N 6°39′35″E | |
| Meppel | Meppel | 52°41′45″N 6°11′40″E | |
| Meppen | Coevorden | 52°46′55″N 6°41′45″E | |
| Middelveen | De Wolden | 52°39′25″N 6°25′20″E | |
| Middendorp | Emmen | 52°38′25″N 7°01′10″E | |
| Middendorp | Emmen | 52°39′50″N 6°54′00″E | |
| Midlaren | Tynaarlo | 53°06′35″N 6°40′40″E | |
| Molenstad | Westerveld | 52°51′25″N 6°22′10″E | |
| Munsterscheveld | Emmen | 52°49′30″N 7°04′05″E | |
| Nietap | Noordenveld | 53°09′35″N 6°24′00″E | |
| Nieuw-Amsterdam | Emmen | 52°42′40″N 6°51′20″E | |
| Nieuw-Annerveen | Aa en Hunze | 53°04′00″N 6°46′35″E | |
| Nieuw-Balinge | Midden-Drenthe | 52°46′00″N 6°36′25″E | |
| Nieuw-Buinen | Borger-Odoorn | 52°57′45″N 6°57′00″E | |
| Nieuw-Dordrecht | Emmen | 52°44′55″N 6°58′05″E | |
| Nieuwediep | Aa en Hunze | 53°02′30″N 6°51′30″E | |
| Nieuwe Krim | Coevorden | 52°40′05″N 6°39′05″E | |
| Nieuweroord | Hoogeveen | 52°43′35″N 6°33′45″E | |
| Nieuwlande | Hoogeveen | 52°41′45″N 6°36′50″E | |
| Nieuw-Roden | Noordenveld | 53°07′55″N 6°23′50″E | |
| Nieuw-Schoonebeek | Emmen | 52°38′55″N 6°59′10″E | |
| Nieuw-Weerdinge | Emmen | 52°51′20″N 6°59′20″E | |
| Nijensleek | Westerveld | 52°50′00″N 6°09′30″E | |
| Nijeveen | Meppel | 52°44′00″N 6°10′05″E | |
| Nijeveense Bovenboer | Meppel | 52°45′05″N 6°10′30″E | |
| Nijlande | Aa en Hunze | 52°58′25″N 6°37′40″E | |
| Nijstad | Hoogeveen | 52°42′30″N 6°24′30″E | |
| Nolde | De Wolden | 52°38′05″N 6°25′15″E | |
| Nooitgedacht | Aa en Hunze | 52°58′05″N 6°39′45″E | |
| Noordbarge | Emmen | 52°46′25″N 6°53′20″E | |
| Noordscheschut | Hoogeveen | 52°43′25″N 6°32′10″E | |
| Noord-Sleen | Coevorden | 52°47′25″N 6°48′20″E | |
| Noordwijk | De Wolden | 52°41′00″N 6°17′45″E | |
| Norg | Noordenveld | 53°04′00″N 6°27′30″E | |
| Norgervaart | Midden-Drenthe | 53°00′05″N 6°29′20″E | |
| Nuil | Hoogeveen | 52°47′20″N 6°27′05″E | |
| Odoorn | Borger-Odoorn | 52°50′55″N 6°51′05″E | |
| Odoornerveen | Borger-Odoorn | 52°50′45″N 6°46′55″E | |
| Oldendiever | Westerveld | 52°51′00″N 6°19′00″E | |
| Oldenhave | De Wolden | 52°45′05″N 6°20′30″E | |
| Oosteinde | De Wolden | 52°44′20″N 6°17′00″E | |
| Oosterbroek | Tynaarlo | 53°08′10″N 6°35′55″E | Former hamlet. |
| Oosterhesselen | Coevorden | 52°45′15″N 6°43′20″E | |
| Oosterse Bos | Emmen | 52°39′25″N 6°54′30″E | |
| Oranje | Midden-Drenthe | 52°54′25″N 6°26′50″E | |
| Oranjedorp | Emmen | 52°44′25″N 6°56′45″E | |
| Orvelte | Midden-Drenthe | 52°50′40″N 6°39′35″E | |
| Oshaar | De Wolden | 52°41′25″N 6°21′50″E | |
| Oud-Annerveen | Aa en Hunze | 53°05′15″N 6°45′50″E | |
| Oudemolen | Tynaarlo | 53°03′00″N 6°38′20″E | |
| Oude Willem | Westerveld | 52°53′50″N 6°18′30″E | |
| Oud Veeningen | De Wolden | 52°40′25″N 6°22′10″E | |
| Paardelanden | De Wolden | 52°37′30″N 6°27′55″E | |
| Padhuis | Coevorden | 52°39′40″N 6°50′55″E | |
| Papenvoort | Aa en Hunze | 52°57′10″N 6°42′10″E | |
| Paterswolde | Tynaarlo | 53°08′40″N 6°33′55″E | |
| Peest | Noordenveld | 53°03′35″N 6°29′50″E | |
| Peize | Noordenveld | 53°08′50″N 6°29′50″E | |
| Peizermade | Noordenveld | 53°11′15″N 6°30′40″E | |
| Peizerwold | Noordenveld | 53°09′25″N 6°29′35″E | |
| Pesse | Hoogeveen | 52°46′20″N 6°27′15″E | |
| Pieperij | De Wolden | 52°38′25″N 6°22′10″E | |
| Pikveld | Coevorden | 52°39′25″N 6°46′20″E | |
| Rhee | Assen | 53°02′00″N 6°34′00″E | |
| Rheebruggen | De Wolden | 52°47′05″N 6°18′00″E | |
| Rheeveld | Midden-Drenthe | 52°52′35″N 6°30′10″E | |
| Roden | Noordenveld | 53°08′15″N 6°25′15″E | |
| Roderesch | Noordenveld | 53°06′55″N 6°25′25″E | |
| Roderwolde | Noordenveld | 53°10′05″N 6°28′10″E | |
| Rogat | Meppel | 52°41′20″N 6°15′55″E | |
| Rolde | Aa en Hunze | 52°59′05″N 6°38′55″E | |
| Roswinkel | Emmen | 52°50′15″N 7°02′20″E | |
| Ruinen | De Wolden | 52°45′45″N 6°21′15″E | |
| Ruinerweide | De Wolden | 52°43′50″N 6°20′05″E | |
| Ruinerwold | De Wolden | 52°43′25″N 6°14′55″E | |
| Sandebuur | Noordenveld | 53°10′20″N 6°27′20″E | |
| Schelfhorst | Tynaarlo | 53°09′30″N 6°32′55″E | |
| Schieven | Assen | 52°58′45″N 6°35′25″E | |
| Schimmelarij | Coevorden | 52°42′05″N 6°49′00″E | |
| Schipborg | Aa en Hunze | 53°04′30″N 6°40′15″E | |
| Schoonebeek | Emmen | 52°39′45″N 6°53′05″E | |
| Schoonloo | Aa en Hunze | 52°54′20″N 6°42′00″E | |
| Schoonoord | Coevorden | 52°50′45″N 6°45′20″E | |
| Schottershuizen | De Wolden | 52°39′25″N 6°25′55″E | |
| Schrapveen | De Wolden | 52°37′50″N 6°27′05″E | |
| Schreierswijk | Aa en Hunze | 52°59′10″N 6°51′20″E | |
| Schutwijk | Emmen | 52°41′55″N 6°57′40″E | |
| Siberië | Hoogeveen | 52°44′55″N 6°31′20″E | |
| Sleen | Coevorden | 52°46′15″N 6°48′10″E | |
| Smalbroek | Midden-Drenthe | 52°50′35″N 6°29′35″E | |
| Smilde | Midden-Drenthe | 52°56′55″N 6°26′55″E | |
| Spier | Midden-Drenthe | 52°49′10″N 6°28′00″E | |
| Spijkerboor | Aa en Hunze | 53°04′35″N 6°46′00″E | |
| Stadterij | Hoogeveen | 52°44′25″N 6°29′25″E | |
| Steenbergen | De Wolden | 52°40′50″N 6°25′45″E | |
| Steenbergen | Noordenveld | 53°06′00″N 6°24′30″E | |
| Steenwijksmoer | Coevorden | 52°40′10″N 6°41′55″E | |
| Stieltjeskanaal | Coevorden | 52°40′30″N 6°49′45″E | |
| Streek | Aa en Hunze | 53°02′00″N 6°50′55″E | |
| Struikberg | De Wolden | 52°42′25″N 6°20′35″E | |
| Stuifzand | Hoogeveen | 52°44′50″N 6°30′00″E | |
| Taarlo | Tynaarlo | 53°02′00″N 6°37′35″E | |
| Ten Arlo | De Wolden | 52°41′50″N 6°26′05″E | |
| Ter Aard | Assen | 53°01′35″N 6°32′50″E | |
| Terheijl | Noordenveld | 53°08′50″N 6°23′25″E | |
| Ter Horst | Midden-Drenthe | 52°50′35″N 6°30′30″E | |
| 't Haantje | Coevorden | 52°48′55″N 6°49′35″E | |
| Tiendeveen | Hoogeveen | 52°44′50″N 6°32′40″E | |
| 't Noorden | Hoogeveen | 52°44′35″N 6°33′30″E | |
| Torenveen | Aa en Hunze | 53°00′25″N 6°50′15″E | |
| Tweede Exloërmond | Borger-Odoorn | 52°54′35″N 6°56′00″E | |
| Tweede Valthermond | Borger-Odoorn | 52°53′40″N 7°01′40″E | |
| Tynaarlo | Tynaarlo | 53°04′40″N 6°37′00″E | |
| Ubbena | Assen | 53°02′45″N 6°34′20″E | |
| Uffelte | Westerveld | 52°47′25″N 6°16′50″E | |
| Valsteeg | Coevorden | 52°42′35″N 6°44′35″E | |
| Valthe | Borger-Odoorn | 52°50′45″N 6°53′40″E | |
| Valtherblokken | Borger-Odoorn | 52°51′10″N 6°55′10″E | |
| Valthermond | Borger-Odoorn | 52°52′55″N 6°57′45″E | |
| Valthermussel | Borger-Odoorn | 52°54′30″N 7°01′15″E | |
| Veenhof | Aa en Hunze | 53°00′15″N 6°48′35″E | |
| Veenhuizen | Coevorden | 52°42′20″N 6°42′15″E | |
| Veenhuizen | Noordenveld | 53°01′55″N 6°23′45″E | |
| Veeningen | De Wolden | 52°40′10″N 6°22′10″E | |
| Veenoord | Emmen | 52°42′55″N 6°50′30″E | |
| Vledder | Westerveld | 52°51′20″N 6°12′30″E | |
| Vledderveen | Westerveld | 52°52′35″N 6°11′15″E | |
| Vlieghuis | Coevorden | 52°39′30″N 6°50′15″E | |
| Vossebelt | Coevorden | 52°40′50″N 6°42′05″E | |
| Vredenheim | Aa en Hunze | 52°56′20″N 6°38′10″E | |
| Vries | Tynaarlo | 53°04′25″N 6°34′40″E | |
| Vuile Riete | De Wolden | 52°38′00″N 6°28′40″E | |
| Wachtum | Coevorden | 52°43′30″N 6°45′00″E | |
| Wapse | Westerveld | 52°51′35″N 6°16′00″E | |
| Wapserveen | Westerveld | 52°49′30″N 6°13′05″E | |
| Wateren | Westerveld | 52°54′45″N 6°16′45″E | |
| Weerdinge | Emmen | 52°49′10″N 6°55′05″E | |
| Weerwille | De Wolden | 52°43′05″N 6°18′15″E | |
| Weijerswold | Coevorden | 52°39′25″N 6°48′30″E | |
| Weiteveen | Emmen | 52°40′20″N 6°59′15″E | |
| Wemmenhove | De Wolden | 52°39′45″N 6°24′40″E | |
| Westdorp | Borger-Odoorn | 52°54′15″N 6°46′00″E | |
| Westeinde | Westerveld | 52°49′25″N 6°20′55″E | |
| Westenesch | Emmen | 52°47′10″N 6°52′25″E | |
| Westerbork | Midden-Drenthe | 52°51′00″N 6°36′30″E | |
| Westerse Bos | Emmen | 52°40′10″N 6°51′35″E | |
| Westervelde | Noordenveld | 53°03′15″N 6°26′30″E | |
| Wezup | Coevorden | 52°48′40″N 6°43′10″E | |
| Wezuperbrug | Coevorden | 52°50′25″N 6°43′10″E | |
| Wijster | Midden-Drenthe | 52°49′00″N 6°31′05″E | |
| Wilhelminaoord | Westerveld | 52°51′20″N 6°09′50″E | |
| Wilhelmsoord | Emmen | 52°44′30″N 6°51′05″E | |
| Winde | Tynaarlo | 53°07′40″N 6°31′40″E | |
| Wittelte | Westerveld | 52°49′45″N 6°20′10″E | |
| Witten | Assen | 52°58′50″N 6°31′00″E | |
| Witteveen | De Wolden | 52°47′00″N 6°21′25″E | |
| Witteveen | Midden-Drenthe | 52°48′50″N 6°39′40″E | |
| Yde | Tynaarlo | 53°07′00″N 6°35′35″E | |
| Zandpol | Emmen | 52°41′40″N 6°51′55″E | |
| Zeegse | Tynaarlo | 53°04′05″N 6°38′45″E | |
| Zeijen | Tynaarlo | 53°02′50″N 6°32′45″E | |
| Zeijerveen | Assen | 53°00′40″N 6°31′10″E | |
| Zeijerveld | Assen | 53°02′15″N 6°31′20″E | |
| Zorgvlied | Westerveld | 52°55′15″N 6°15′20″E | |
| Zuidbarge | Emmen | 52°45′20″N 6°54′10″E | |
| Zuideind | Borger-Odoorn | 52°57′40″N 6°51′50″E | |
| Zuideropgaande | Hoogeveen | 52°41′15″N 6°33′10″E | |
| Zuidlaarderveen | Tynaarlo | 53°06′15″N 6°44′55″E | |
| Zuidlaren | Tynaarlo | 53°05′40″N 6°40′55″E | |
| Zuidveld | Midden-Drenthe | 52°52′00″N 6°38′10″E | |
| Zuidvelde | Noordenveld | 53°02′45″N 6°27′30″E | |
| Zuidwolde | De Wolden | 52°40′20″N 6°25′40″E | |
| Zwartemeer | Emmen | 52°43′10″N 7°02′30″E | |
| Zwartschaap | Hoogeveen | 52°45′30″N 6°30′20″E | |
| Zweeloo | Coevorden | 52°47′40″N 6°43′50″E | |
| Zwiggelte | Midden-Drenthe | 52°52′20″N 6°35′10″E | |
| Zwinderen | Coevorden | 52°43′35″N 6°40′35″E | |
