= Noordwijk (disambiguation) =

Noordwijk is the name of several communities in the Netherlands:

- Noordwijk, municipality in South Holland, including the towns:
  - Noordwijk-Binnen
  - Noordwijk aan Zee
  - Noordwijkerhout
- Noordwijk, Drenthe, hamlet in Drenthe province
- Noordwijk, Groningen, small village in Groningen province

== See also ==
- Noordwyk, suburb of Johannesburg, South Africa
