= List of cities, towns and villages in the Netherlands by province =

This list of cities, towns and villages in the Netherlands by province is a survey of lists by province:

- List of cities, towns and villages in Drenthe
- List of cities, towns and villages in Flevoland
- List of cities, towns and villages in Friesland
- List of cities, towns and villages in Gelderland
- List of cities, towns and villages in Groningen
- List of cities, towns and villages in Limburg
- List of cities, towns and villages in North Brabant
- List of cities, towns and villages in North Holland
- List of cities, towns and villages in Overijssel
- List of cities, towns and villages in South Holland
- List of cities, towns and villages in Utrecht
- List of cities, towns and villages in Zeeland

== See also ==
- List of cities in the Netherlands by province
- List of populated places in the Netherlands
