= Weiteveen =

- Village
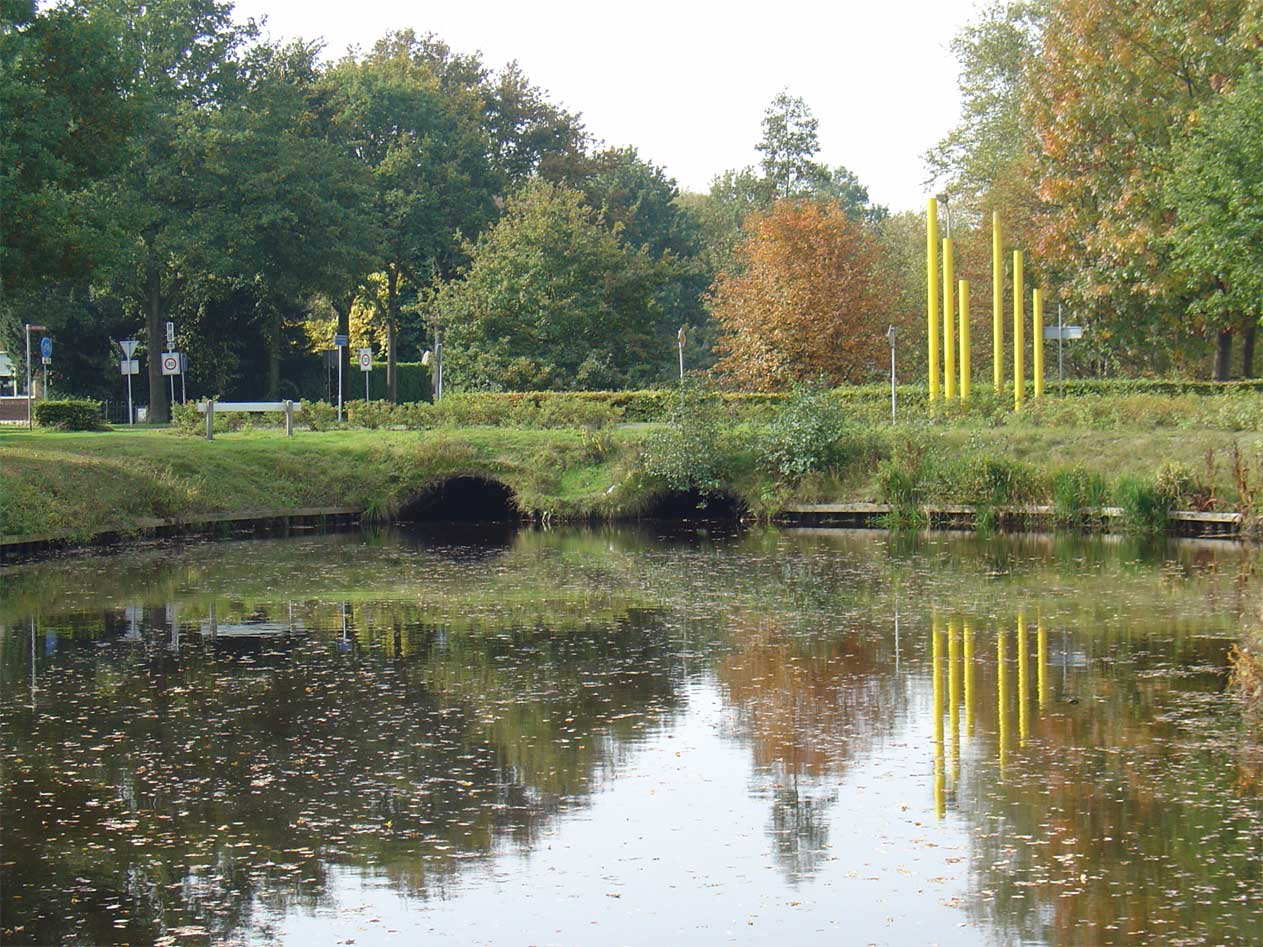
- Weiteveen aan het Dommerskanaal

- Location in province of Drenthe in the Netherlands Weiteveen (Netherlands)
- Coordinates: 52°40′N 7°0′E
- Country: Netherlands
- Province: Drenthe
- Municipality: Emmen

Area
  - Total: 15.53 km^{2} (6.00 sq mi)
- Elevation: 17 m (56 ft)

Population (2021)
  - Total: 1,670
  - Density: 108/km^{2} (279/sq mi)
- Postal code: 7765
- Dialing code: 0591

Weiteveen is a village in the Netherlands and is part of the Emmen municipality in Drenthe.

== History ==
Weiteveen started in the 1850s by Hannoverian settlers who settled in the Amsterdamscheveld. They built sod houses, started excavating the peat, and planting buckwheat on the burnt fields. In 1919, the Mary Queen of Peace Church was built in the village. In 1924, a protestant settlement appeared. Up to 1954, the area was known as Nieuw-Schoonebekerveld. In 1954, the border between Emmen and Schoonebeek was redrawn, and the two settlements merged as Weiteveen. The name is a combination of buckwheat and bog.

In 1925, the tabernacle of the Mary Queen of Peace Church was stolen. Money was raised among the Catholics in the Netherlands to buy a new tabernacle. A week later, the stolen item was discovered in the moorland. A chapel has been constructed at the site where the tabernacle was found.

== Gallery ==
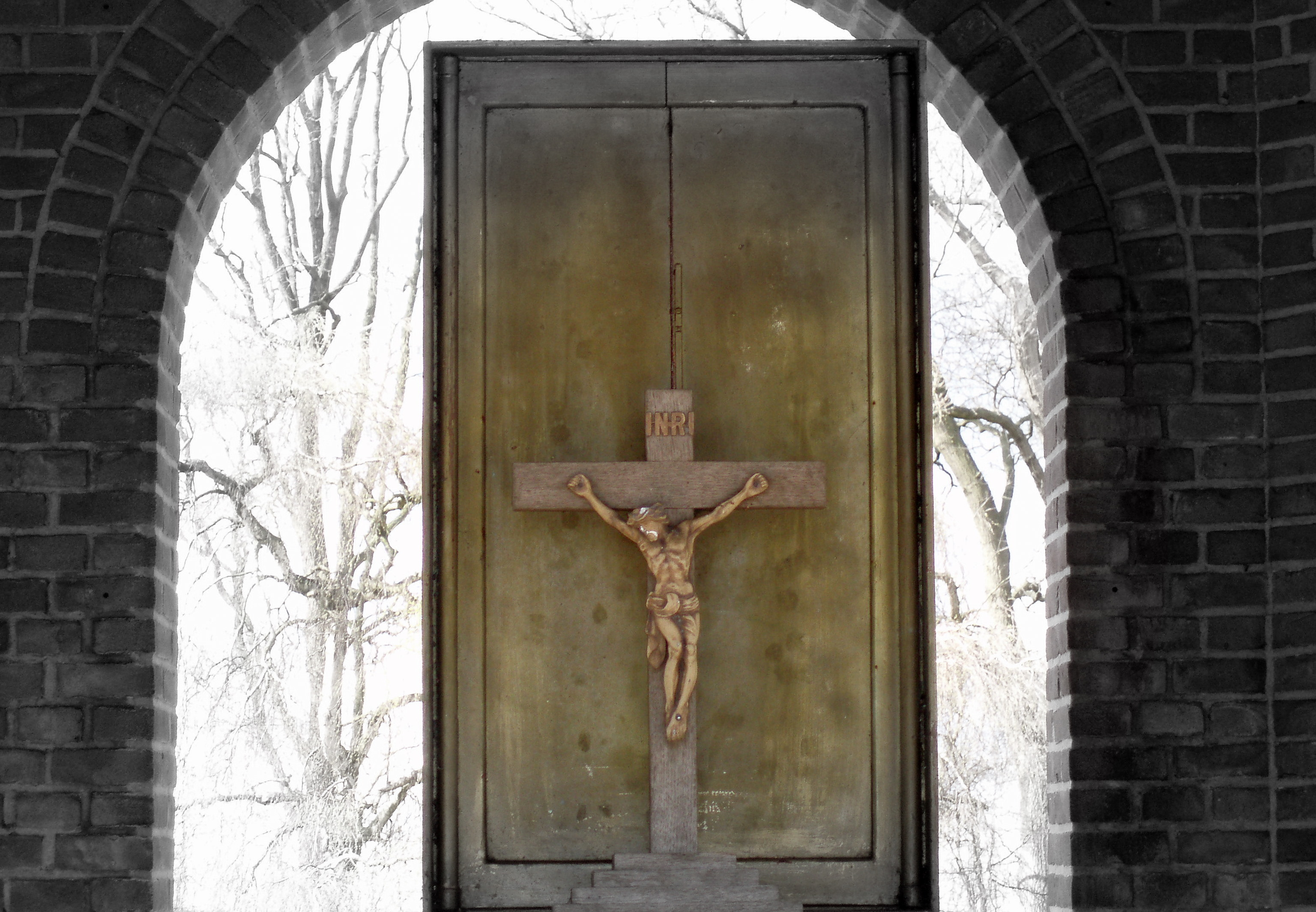
The lost and found tabernacle of Weiteveen

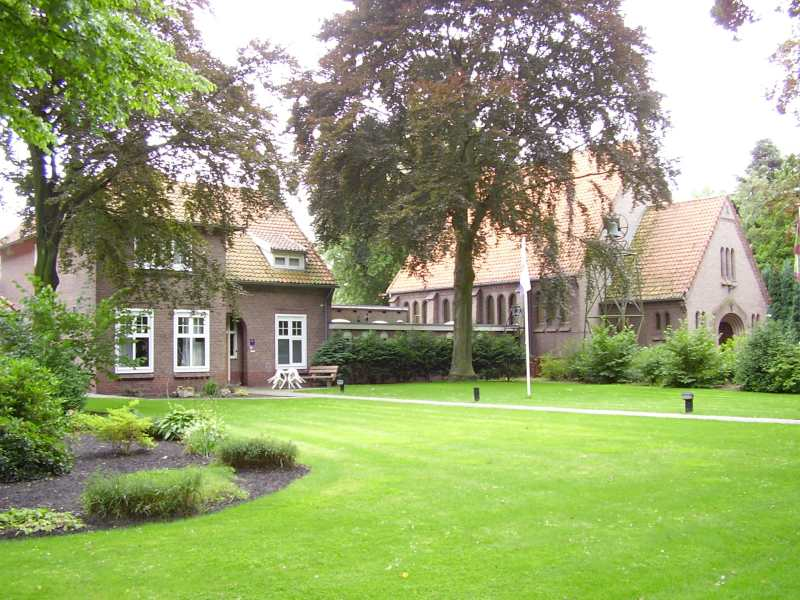
Church and bog excursion centre

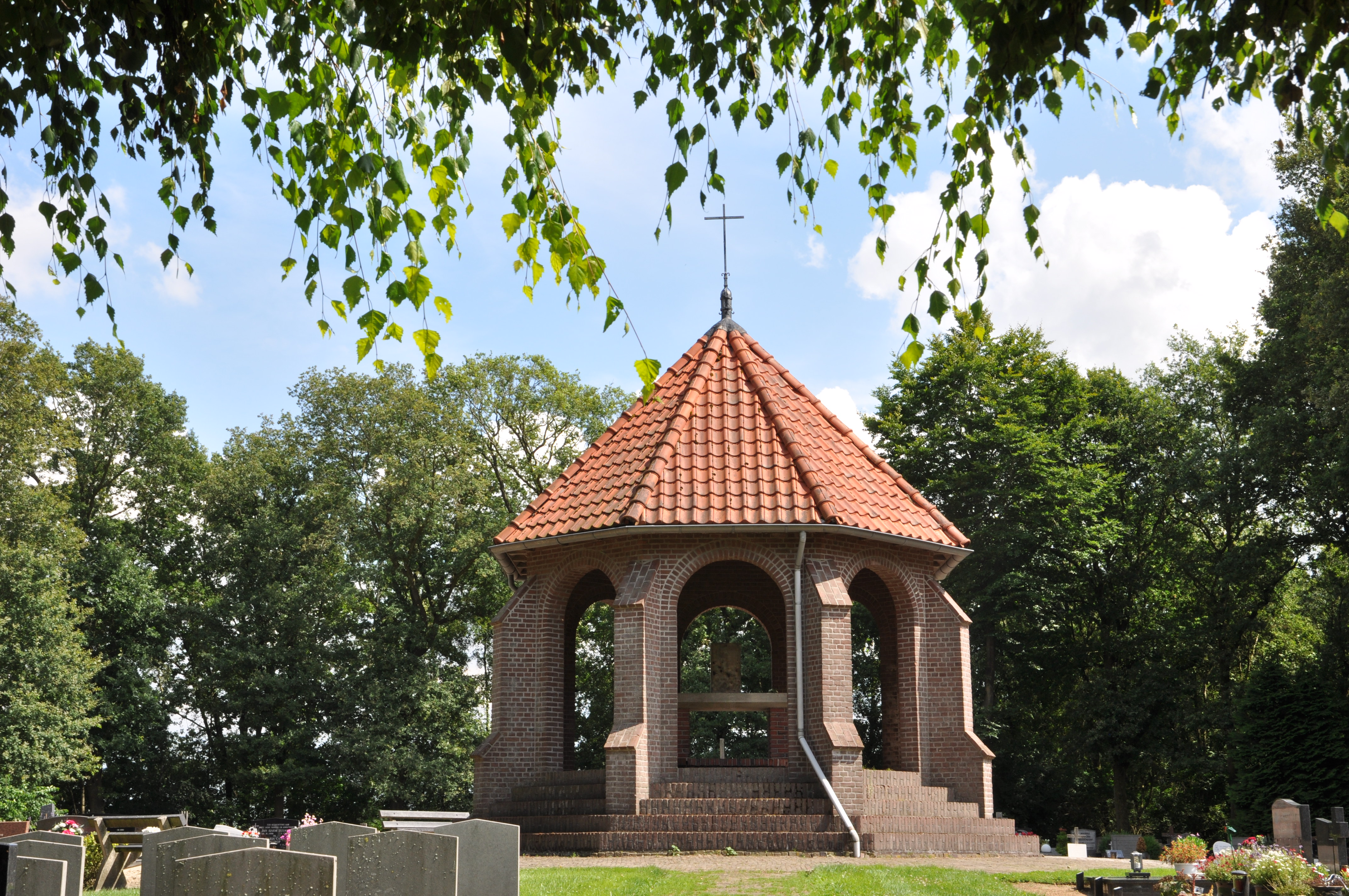
Cemetery of Weiteveen

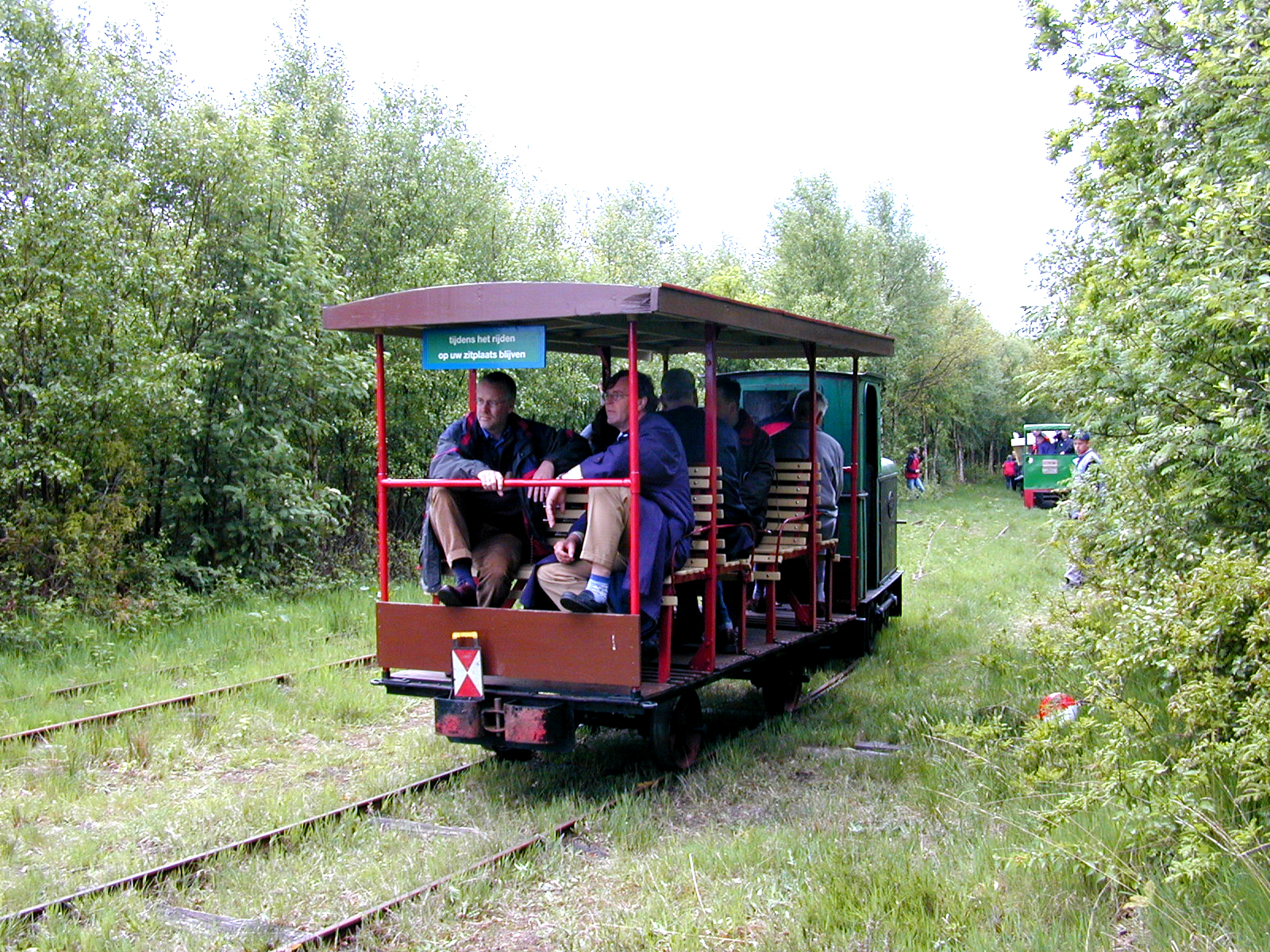
Industrial narrow gauge railway museum
