= List of cities in the Netherlands by province =

Map of the major municipalities in the Netherlands

There are no formal rules in the Netherlands to distinguish cities from other settlements. Smaller settlements are usually called dorp, comparable with villages in English speaking countries. The Dutch word for city is stad (plural: steden). The intermediate category of town does not exist in Dutch, but provinciestad (small city in the province) comes close.

Historically, there existed systems of city rights, granted by the territorial lords, which defined the status of a place: a stad or dorp. Cities were self-governing and had several privileges. In 1851 the granting of city rights and all privileges and special status of cities were abolished. Since then, the only local administrative unit is the municipality. Regardless of this legal change, many people still use the old city rights as a criterion: certain small settlements proudly call themselves a stad because they historically had city rights, while other, newer towns may not get this recognition. Yet the old and third largest urban center of The Hague, has the status of the seat of the national government, but never received city rights for deliberate historical reasons.

Geographers and policy makers can distinguish between places with respect to the number of inhabitants or the economic and planological functions within a larger area. Hence, settlements can be considered a city if they function as an urban centre in a rural area; while larger population centres in densely populated areas are often neither considered a village nor a city and are usually referred to with the generic word plaats (place). Inhabitants may also base their choice of words just on the subjective way they experience life at a certain place.

== List of cities by province ==
When discussing cities, the distinction is sometimes made between the cities in two urban networks.

The largest urban network is known as Randstad, including the largest four cities in the Netherlands: Amsterdam, Rotterdam, The Hague and Utrecht. Of these, 3 have historic city rights: Utrecht from 1122; Amsterdam from 1306; and Rotterdam from 1340. The second urban network in the Netherlands is known as Brabantstad, a partnership of the Brabant "Big 5": Eindhoven, Tilburg, Breda, 's-Hertogenbosch and Helmond. In addition, there are several medium-sized cities in the Netherlands without an urban network. Groningen, notably, is a medium-sized city (sixth-largest city in the Netherlands), without an urban network.

Province	City	Province map
Drenthe	Assen	Drenthe
Drenthe	Coevorden	Drenthe
Drenthe	Emmen	Drenthe
Drenthe	Hoogeveen	Drenthe
Drenthe	Meppel	Drenthe
Flevoland	Almere	Flevoland
Flevoland	Biddinghuizen	Flevoland
Flevoland	Emmeloord	Flevoland
Flevoland	Lelystad	Flevoland
Friesland	Bolsward	Friesland
Friesland	Dokkum	Friesland
Friesland	Franeker	Friesland
Friesland	Harlingen	Friesland
Friesland	Hindeloopen	Friesland
Friesland	IJlst	Friesland
Friesland	Leeuwarden	Friesland
Friesland	Sloten	Friesland
Friesland	Sneek	Friesland
Friesland	Stavoren	Friesland
Friesland	Workum	Friesland
Gelderland	Apeldoorn	Gelderland
Gelderland	Arnhem	Gelderland
Gelderland	Bredevoort	Gelderland
Gelderland	Buren	Gelderland
Gelderland	Borculo	Gelderland
Gelderland	Bronkhorst	Gelderland
Gelderland	Culemborg	Gelderland
Gelderland	Dieren	Gelderland
Gelderland	Doetinchem	Gelderland
Gelderland	Ede	Gelderland
Gelderland	Elburg	Gelderland
Gelderland	Enspijk	Gelderland
Gelderland	Gendt	Gelderland
Gelderland	Groenlo	Gelderland
Gelderland	Harderwijk	Gelderland
Gelderland	Hattem	Gelderland
Gelderland	Heukelum	Gelderland
Gelderland	Huissen	Gelderland
Gelderland	Nijkerk	Gelderland
Gelderland	Nijmegen	Gelderland
Gelderland	Staverden	Gelderland
Gelderland	Tiel	Gelderland
Gelderland	Ulft	Gelderland
Gelderland	Voorst	Gelderland
Gelderland	Wageningen	Gelderland
Gelderland	Wijchen	Gelderland
Gelderland	Winterswijk	Gelderland
Gelderland	Zaltbommel	Gelderland
Gelderland	Zevenaar	Gelderland
Gelderland	Zutphen	Gelderland
Groningen	Appingedam	Groningen
Groningen	Delfzijl	Groningen
Groningen	Groningen	Groningen
Groningen	Hoogezand-Sappemeer	Groningen
Groningen	Stadskanaal	Groningen
Groningen	Veendam	Groningen
Groningen	Winschoten	Groningen
Limburg	Echt	Limburg
Limburg	Geleen	Limburg
Limburg	Gennep	Limburg
Limburg	Heerlen	Limburg
Limburg	Kerkrade	Limburg
Limburg	Tegelen	Limburg
Limburg	Kessel	Limburg
Limburg	Landgraaf	Limburg
Limburg	Maastricht	Limburg
Limburg	Montfort	Limburg
Limburg	Nieuwstadt	Limburg
Limburg	Roermond	Limburg
Limburg	Schin op Geul	Limburg
Limburg	Sittard	Limburg
Limburg	Stein	Limburg
Limburg	Susteren	Limburg
Limburg	Thorn	Limburg
Limburg	Vaals	Limburg
Limburg	Valkenburg	Limburg
Limburg	Venray	Limburg
Limburg	Venlo	Limburg
Limburg	Weert	Limburg
North Brabant	's-Hertogenbosch (Den Bosch)	North Brabant
North Brabant	Bergen op Zoom	North Brabant
North Brabant	Boxtel	North Brabant
North Brabant	Breda	North Brabant
North Brabant	Eindhoven	North Brabant
North Brabant	Geertruidenberg	North Brabant
North Brabant	Geldrop	North Brabant
North Brabant	Grave	North Brabant
North Brabant	Helmond	North Brabant
North Brabant	Heusden	North Brabant
North Brabant	Klundert	North Brabant
North Brabant	Oosterhout	North Brabant
North Brabant	Oss	North Brabant
North Brabant	Ravenstein	North Brabant
North Brabant	Roosendaal	North Brabant
North Brabant	Sint-Oedenrode	North Brabant
North Brabant	Tilburg	North Brabant
North Brabant	Valkenswaard	North Brabant
North Brabant	Veldhoven	North Brabant
North Brabant	Waalwijk	North Brabant
North Brabant	Willemstad	North Brabant
North Brabant	Woudrichem	North Brabant
North Holland	Alkmaar	North Holland
North Holland	Amsterdam	North Holland
North Holland	Den Helder	North Holland
North Holland	Edam	North Holland
North Holland	Enkhuizen	North Holland
North Holland	Haarlem	North Holland
North Holland	Heerhugowaard	North Holland
North Holland	Hilversum	North Holland
North Holland	Hoorn	North Holland
North Holland	Laren	North Holland
North Holland	Medemblik	North Holland
North Holland	Monnickendam	North Holland
North Holland	Muiden	North Holland
North Holland	Naarden	North Holland
North Holland	Purmerend	North Holland
North Holland	Schagen	North Holland
North Holland	Velsen	North Holland
North Holland	Volendam	North Holland
North Holland	Weesp	North Holland
North Holland	Zaandam	North Holland
Overijssel	Almelo	Overijssel
Overijssel	Blokzijl	Overijssel
Overijssel	Deventer	Overijssel
Overijssel	Enschede	Overijssel
Overijssel	Genemuiden	Overijssel
Overijssel	Hardenberg	Overijssel
Overijssel	Hasselt	Overijssel
Overijssel	Hengelo	Overijssel
Overijssel	Kampen	Overijssel
Overijssel	Oldenzaal	Overijssel
Overijssel	Rijssen	Overijssel
Overijssel	Steenwijk	Overijssel
Overijssel	Vollenhove	Overijssel
Overijssel	Zwolle	Overijssel
South Holland	Alphen aan den Rijn	South Holland
South Holland	Delft	South Holland
South Holland	Dordrecht	South Holland
South Holland	Gorinchem	South Holland
South Holland	Gouda	South Holland
South Holland	The Hague (Den Haag)	South Holland
South Holland	Haastrecht	South Holland
South Holland	Leiden	South Holland
South Holland	Maassluis	South Holland
South Holland	Nieuwpoort	South Holland
South Holland	Rotterdam	South Holland
South Holland	Schiedam	South Holland
South Holland	Schoonhoven	South Holland
South Holland	Spijkenisse	South Holland
South Holland	Vlaardingen	South Holland
South Holland	Voorburg	South Holland
South Holland	Zoetermeer	South Holland
Utrecht	Amersfoort	Utrecht
Utrecht	Baarn	Utrecht
Utrecht	Bunschoten	Utrecht
Utrecht	Eemnes	Utrecht
Utrecht	Hagestein	Utrecht
Utrecht	Houten	Utrecht
Utrecht	Leerdam	Utrecht
Utrecht	Montfoort	Utrecht
Utrecht	Nieuwegein	Utrecht
Utrecht	Oudewater	Utrecht
Utrecht	Rhenen	Utrecht
Utrecht	Utrecht	Utrecht
Utrecht	Veenendaal	Utrecht
Utrecht	Vianen	Utrecht
Utrecht	Wijk bij Duurstede	Utrecht
Utrecht	Woerden	Utrecht
Utrecht	IJsselstein	Utrecht
Utrecht	Zeist	Utrecht
Zeeland	Arnemuiden	Zeeland
Zeeland	Goes	Zeeland
Zeeland	Hulst	Zeeland
Zeeland	Middelburg	Zeeland
Zeeland	Sluis	Zeeland
Zeeland	Terneuzen	Zeeland
Zeeland	Veere	Zeeland
Zeeland	Vlissingen	Zeeland
Zeeland	Zierikzee	Zeeland

== See also ==
- City rights in the Low Countries
- List of cities, towns and villages in the Netherlands by province
- List of populated places in the Netherlands
- Municipalities of the Netherlands
- Provinces of the Netherlands
