= Emmer-Erfscheidenveen =

- Hamlet
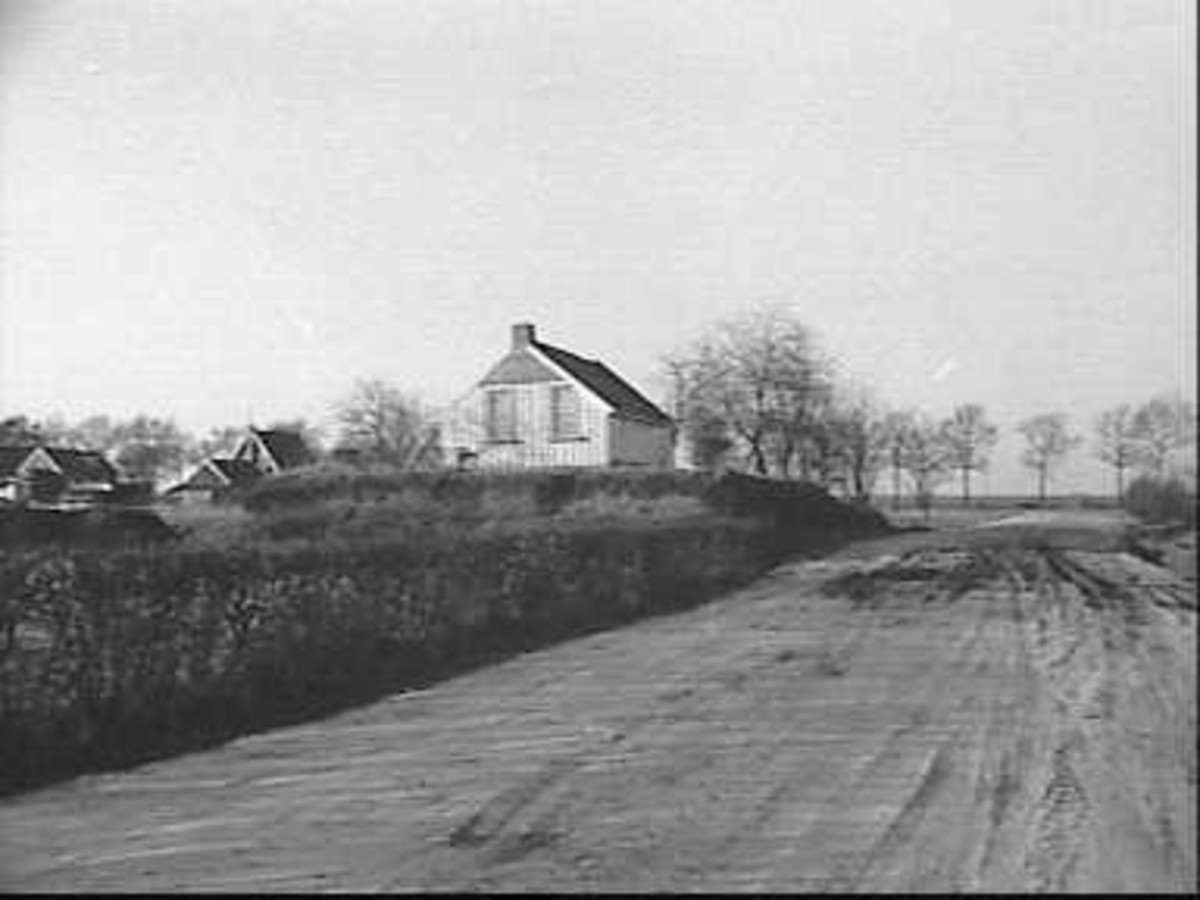

- Location in province of Drenthe in the Netherlands Emmer-Erfscheidenveen (Netherlands)
- Coordinates: 52.8035°N 6.9896°E
- Country: Netherlands
- Province: Drenthe
- Municipality: Emmen

Area
  - Total: 2.98 km^{2} (1.15 sq mi)
- Elevation: 14 m (46 ft)

Population (2021)
  - Total: 1,785
  - Density: 599/km^{2} (1,550/sq mi)
- Postal code: 7881
- Dialing code: 0591

Emmer-Erfscheidenveen is a hamlet in the Netherlands and it is part of the Emmen municipality in Drenthe.

The name translates to "bog property division of Emmen". In 1938, it was designated a hamlet and part of Emmer-Compascuum. Emmer-Erfscheidenveen has a sizeable population, a church and retail, therefore, it should have been considered a village. The postal authorities have put it under Emmer-Compascuum.

== Bog body ==
In 1938, the son of Middeljans, an inhabitant of Emmer-Erfscheidenveen, discovered what he believed to be human remains in the moorland. His father brought in the police who could not make sense of it, and decided not to investigate. Several days later, he told his teacher about the discovery, and the teacher decided to consult an expert.

It was a bog body of a tall man. Only the skin of his body had remained, however his clothes were in good condition. He was buried on a wooden stretcher. The body has been dated to the 12th to 14th century BC making it one of the oldest bog bodies in the Netherlands. He was probably killed. The body is on display in the Drents Museum.
