= Zandpol =

- Village
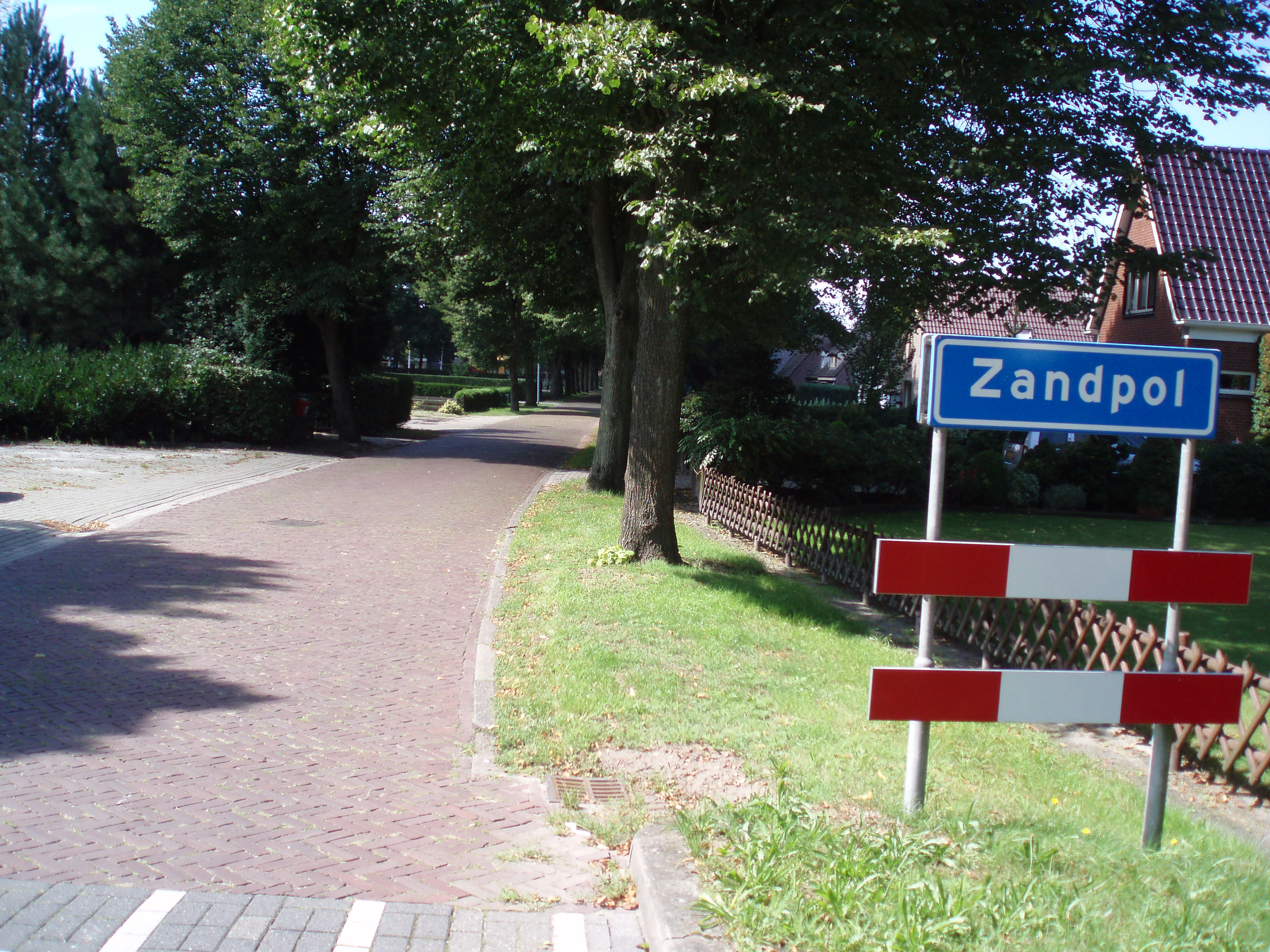

- Location in province of Drenthe in the Netherlands Zandpol (Netherlands)
- Coordinates: 52°41′N 6°52′E
- Country: Netherlands
- Province: Drenthe
- Municipality: Emmen

Area
  - Total: 0.99 km^{2} (0.38 sq mi)
- Elevation: 15 m (49 ft)

Population (2021)
  - Total: 450
  - Density: 450/km^{2} (1,200/sq mi)
- Time zone: UTC+1 (CET)
  - Summer (DST): UTC+2 (CEST)
- Postal code: 7764
- Dialing code: 0591

Zandpol is a village in the Netherlands and it is part of the Emmen municipality in Drenthe.

It was first mentioned in 1975, and means "sand hill". It was the location of the local swimming pool, but has been reduced to a nature bath due to cut backs.
