= Ermerveen =

- Hamlet
- Location in province of Drenthe in the Netherlands Ermerveen (Netherlands)
- Coordinates: 52.7349°N 6.8419°E
- Country: Netherlands
- Province: Drenthe
- Municipality: Emmen

Area
  - Total: 0.43 km^{2} (0.17 sq mi)
- Elevation: 15 m (49 ft)

Population (2021)
  - Total: 20
  - Density: 47/km^{2} (120/sq mi)
- Time zone: UTC+1 (CET)
  - Summer (DST): UTC+2 (CEST)
- Postal code: 7844
- Dialing code: 0591

Ermerveen is a hamlet in the Netherlands and it is part of the Emmen municipality in Drenthe.

Ermerveen is a statistical entity, however the postal authorities have placed it under Veenoord. It was first mentioned in the 1850s as Het ErmerVeen, and means "the bog near Erm. It is located outside the build-up area.
