= De Bente =

Coordinates: 52°40′N 6°45′E

De Bente was a village in the Netherlands and part of the Coevorden municipality in Drenthe. De Bente merged into Dalen in the 19th century.
