= Westerse Bos =

- Hamlet
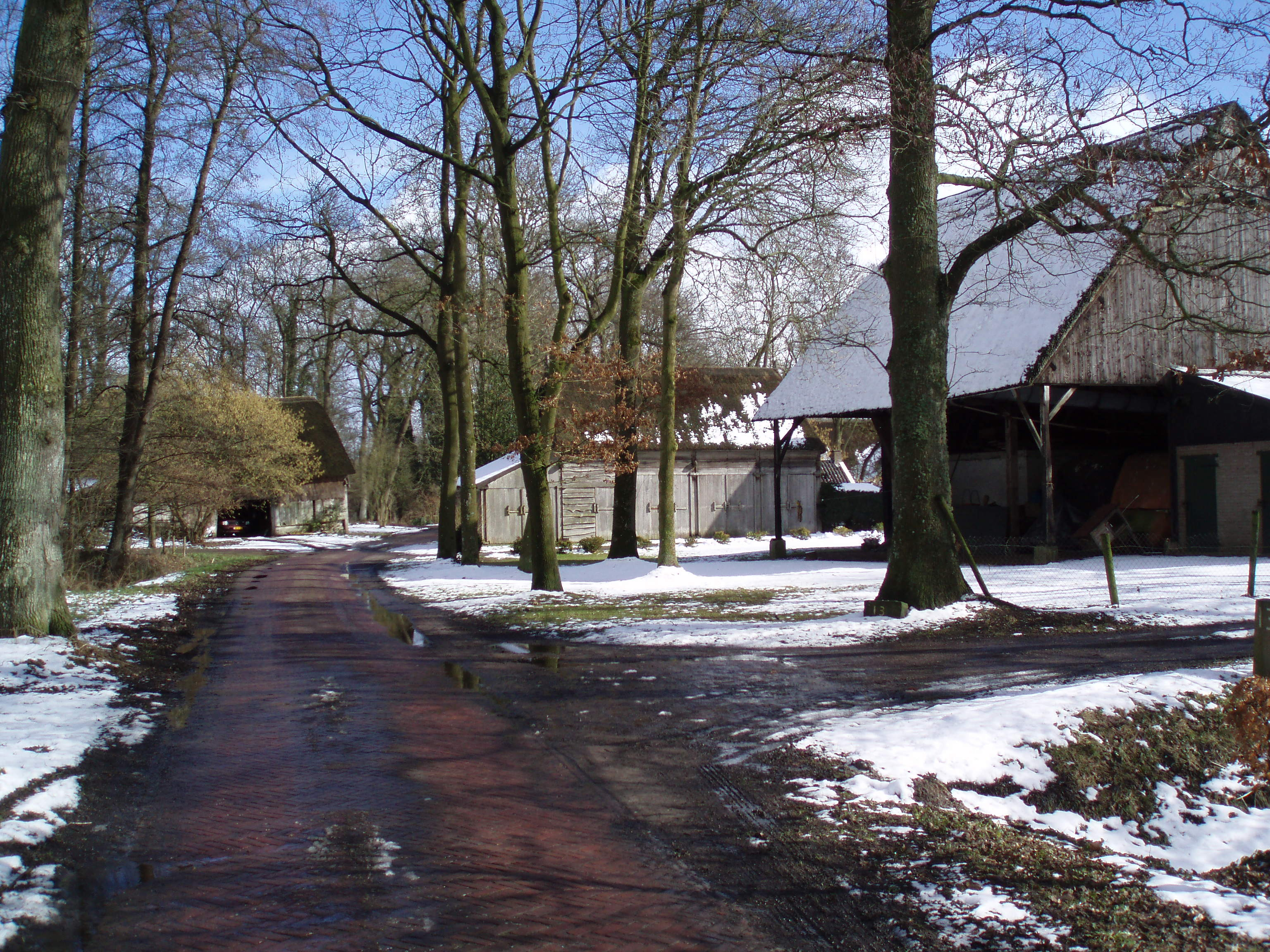
- Westerse Bos in winter

- Location in province of Drenthe in the Netherlands Westerse Bos (Netherlands)
- Coordinates: 52.6691°N 6.8600°E
- Country: Netherlands
- Province: Drenthe
- Municipality: Emmen

Area
  - Total: 1.13 km^{2} (0.44 sq mi)
- Elevation: 13 m (43 ft)

Population (2021)
  - Total: 145
  - Density: 128/km^{2} (332/sq mi)
- Time zone: UTC+1 (CET)
  - Summer (DST): UTC+2 (CEST)
- Postal code: 7761
- Dialing code: 0524

Westerse Bos is a hamlet in the Netherlands and is part of the Emmen municipality in Drenthe.

Westerse Bos is a statistical entity, but the postal authority has placed it under Schoonebeek. It was first mentioned in the 1850s as 't Westeinde, and means "the western forest". In 1988, it became part of the municipality of Emmen.
