= Bonnen, Netherlands =

Bonnen
- Hamlet
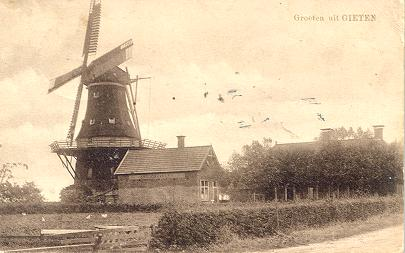
- Windmill in Bonnen

- Location in the province of Drenthe in the Netherlands Bonnen (Netherlands)
- Coordinates: 53.00508°N 6.77509°E
- Country: Netherlands
- Province: Drenthe
- Municipality: Aa en Hunze
- Village: Gieten
- Elevation: 17 m (56 ft)
- Time zone: UTC+1 (CET)
  - Summer (DST): UTC+2 (CEST)
- Postcode: 9461
- Area code: 0592

Bonnen (Dutch: [ˈbɔ.nə(n)]) is a hamlet in the municipality of Aa en Hunze, in the province of Drenthe. It is located directly east of Gieten and north of the hamlet of Achter 't Hout.

== Geography ==
The western part of the hamlet has grown together with the village of Gieten, under which the hamlet falls administratively. The hamlet is also largely within the village core of Gieten. The municipality of Aa en Hunze no longer keeps separate population figures for Bonnen.

The hamlet is situated on the edge of the Hondsrug. When leaving Bonnen in the direction of Gieterveen, the difference in level between the sand, the Hondsrug, and the former peat area is immediately noticeable. The lands south of the road originally belonged to Bonnen as common lands.

== History ==
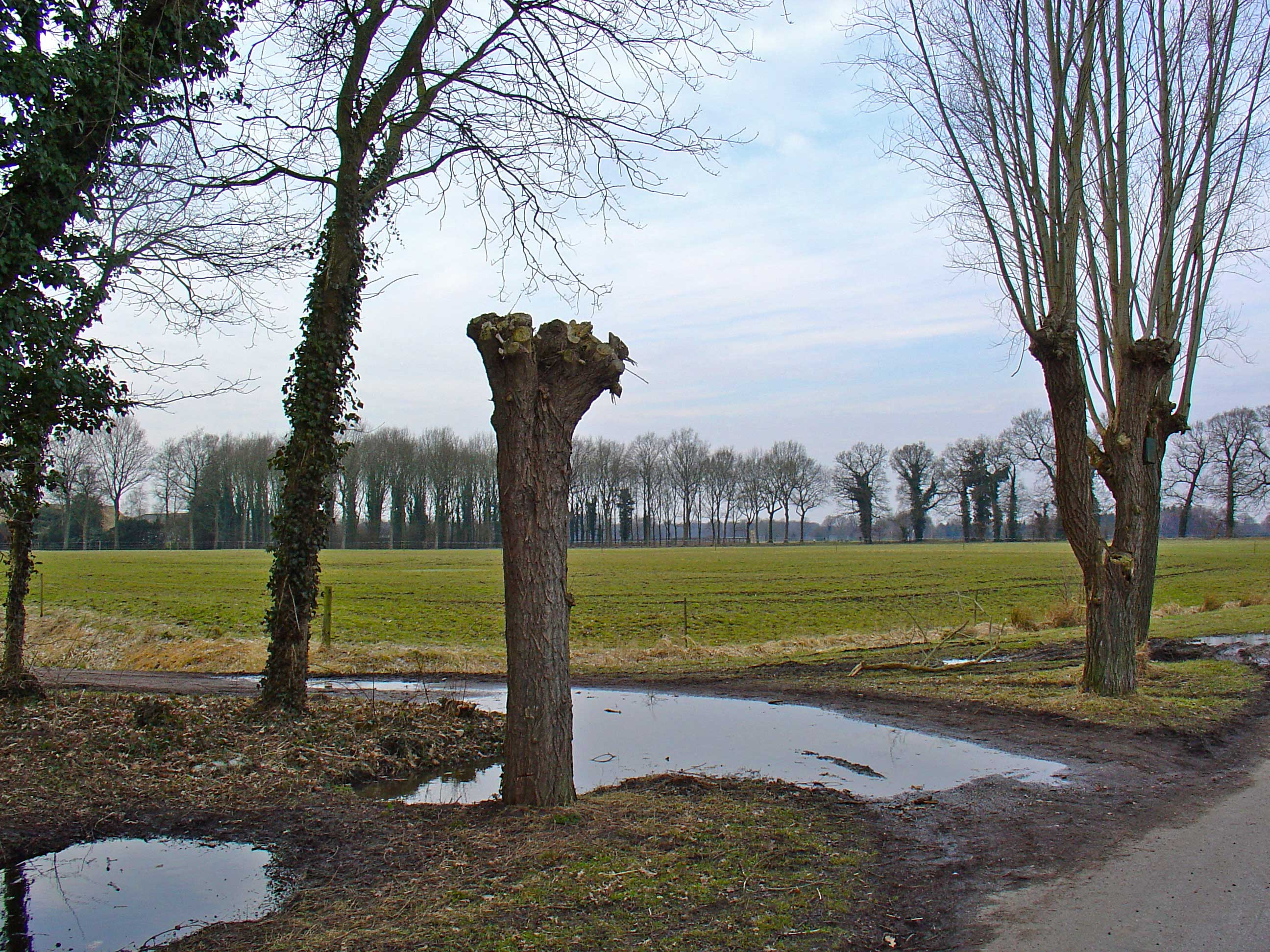
Terrain of the former Entinge manor

Bonne was first attested in 1302 as domus theutonice de Bunne. The hamlet was first recorded with its current name in 1634. The name is probably derived from the Germanic *bunjô ("elevation", "height") or from buun, bune ("wickerwork", "fence"). The final -n of Bonnen is following the example of other Drenthe toponyms of ending in -en.

In the 18th century, the Entinge manor stood in Bonnen. From 1725 until the year of his death in 1743, the bailiff of Drenthe, Nicolaas Harmen van Echten genaamd van Dongen, lived here. In the 16th century, the house, then called Huis te Bonnen, was owned by the Struuck family. Members of this family were involved in the exploitation of the Gasselter and Drouwener peat bogs. Nowadays the field name Jonkersland is a reminder of the period when Bonnen had a manor and Stroeksland of the peat-digger family.

Bonnen has its own primary school since 1923, the Bonnerschool, which is also attended by children from Gieten.
