= Oosterse Bos =

- Hamlet
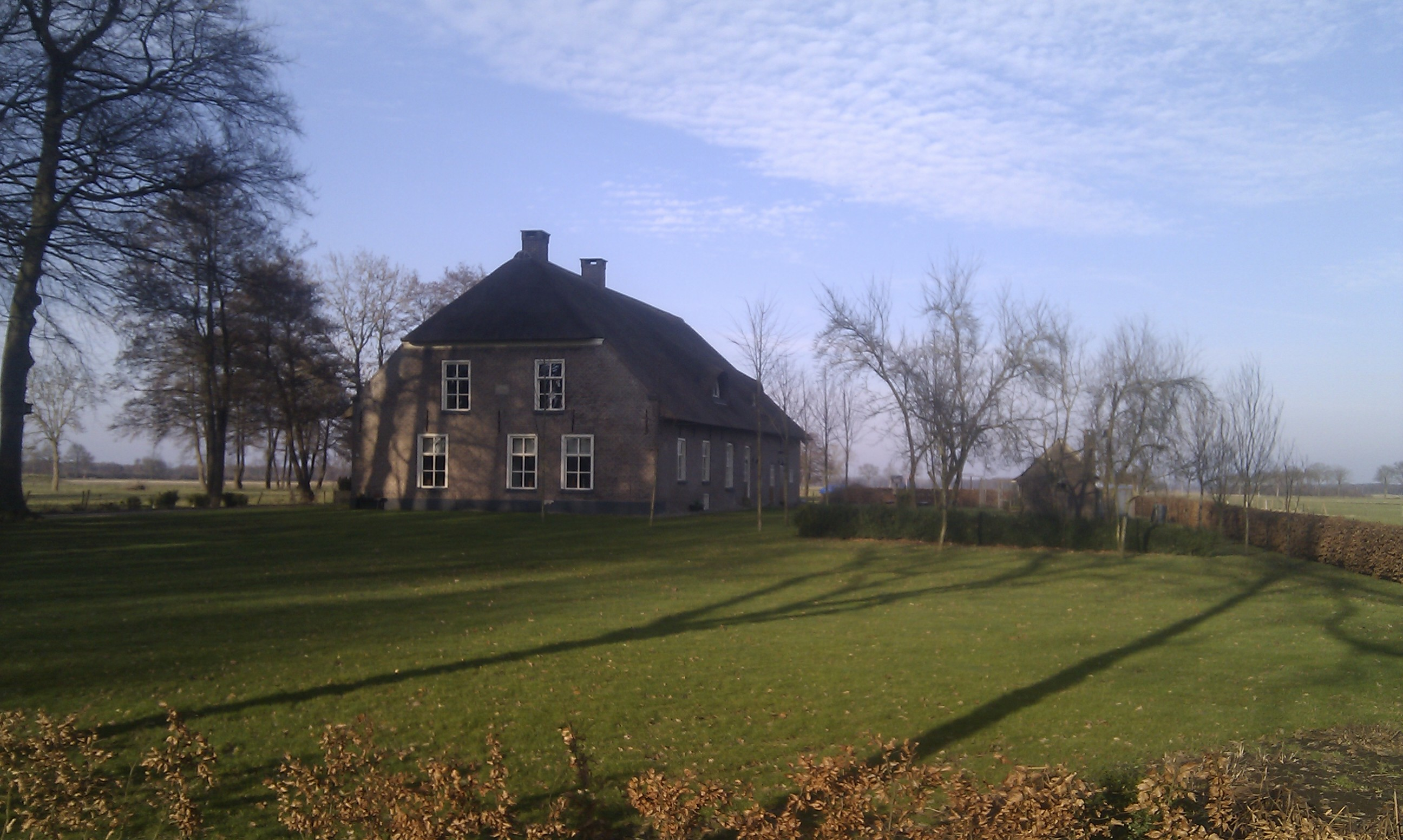
- Farm in Oosterse Bos

- Location in province of Drenthe in the Netherlands Oosterse Bos (Netherlands)
- Coordinates: 52°39′N 6°54′E
- Country: Netherlands
- Province: Drenthe
- Municipality: Emmen

Area
  - Total: 1.29 km^{2} (0.50 sq mi)
- Elevation: 13 m (43 ft)

Population (2021)
  - Total: 195
  - Density: 151/km^{2} (392/sq mi)
- Time zone: UTC+1 (CET)
  - Summer (DST): UTC+2 (CEST)
- Postal code: 7761
- Dialing code: 0524

Oosterse Bos is a hamlet in the Netherlands and is part of the Emmen municipality in Drenthe.

Oosterse Bos has a statistical entry with Middendorp, however the postal authorities have placed it under Schoonebeek. It was first mentioned in the 1850s as 't Oosteinde, and means the eastern forest.
