= Oranjedorp =

- Village
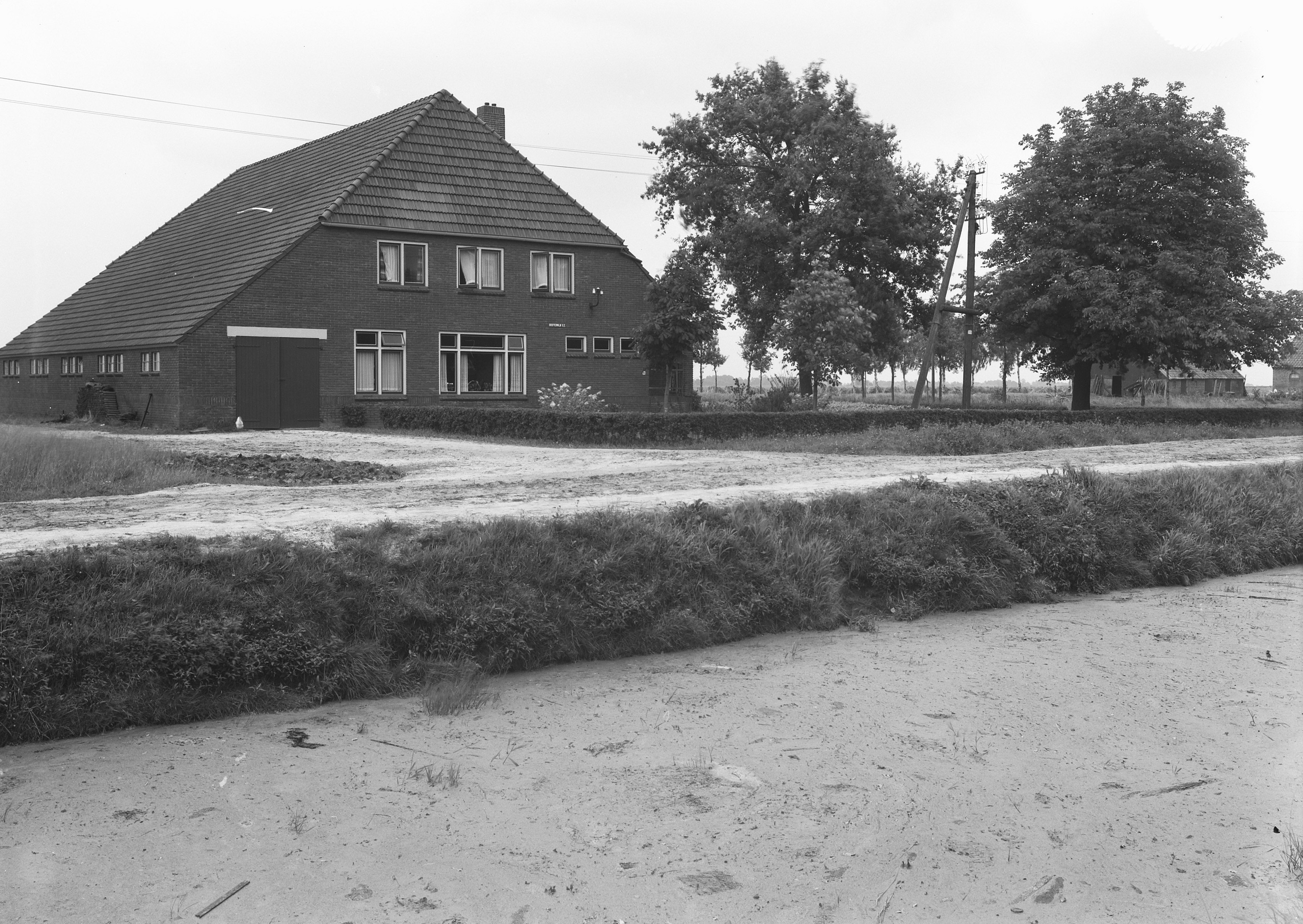
- Farm in Oranjedorp

- Location in province of Drenthe in the Netherlands Oranjedorp (Netherlands)
- Coordinates: 52°44′N 6°56′E
- Country: Netherlands
- Province: Drenthe
- Municipality: Emmen

Area
  - Total: 14.80 km^{2} (5.71 sq mi)
- Elevation: 23 m (75 ft)

Population (2021)
  - Total: 435
  - Density: 29.4/km^{2} (76.1/sq mi)
- Time zone: UTC+1 (CET)
  - Summer (DST): UTC+2 (CEST)
- Postal code: 7885
- Dialing code: 0591

Oranjedorp is a village in the Netherlands and it is part of the Emmen municipality in Drenthe.

Oranjedorp started to develop when the Oranjekanaal was completed in 1858, and peat exploitation started in the area. In 1867, it was first mentioned as Oranjedorp. Even though the postal authorities have placed it under Nieuw-Dordrecht. it is considered a village. In 1932, it was home to 932 people. No church was built in Oranjedorp.

In 1988, a gas desulfurization plant of the Nederlandse Aardolie Maatschappij opened in Oranjedorp, and industry started to move to the village.
