= Klazienaveen-Noord =

- Hamlet
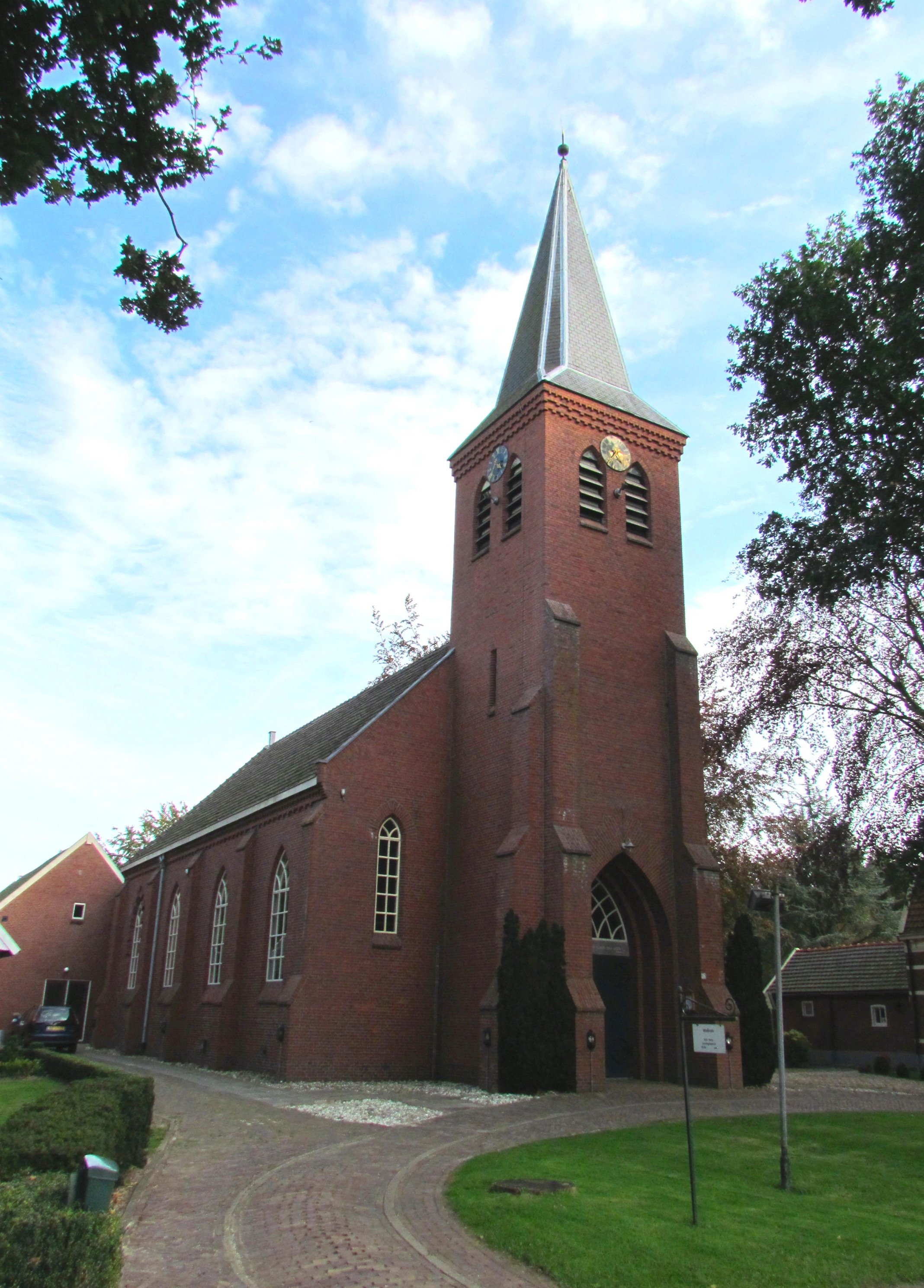
- Church in Klazienaveen-Noord

- Location in province of Drenthe in the Netherlands Klazienaveen-Noord (Netherlands)
- Coordinates: 52°46′19″N 07°00′06″E
- Country: Netherlands
- Province: Drenthe
- Municipality: Emmen
- Elevation: 21 m (69 ft)
- Time zone: UTC+1 (CET)
  - Summer (DST): UTC+2 (CEST)
- Postal code: 7891
- Dialing code: 0591

Klazienaveen-Noord is a hamlet in the Netherlands and it is part of the Emmen municipality in Drenthe.

Klazienaveen-Noord does not have a statistical entity, and the postal authorities have placed it under Klazienaveen. The hamlet started in 1902 around a church built by Braakhekke for the inhabitants of Klazienaveen. In 1923, a stone church was built. There are about 80 houses in the hamlet.
