= Westervelde =

- Village
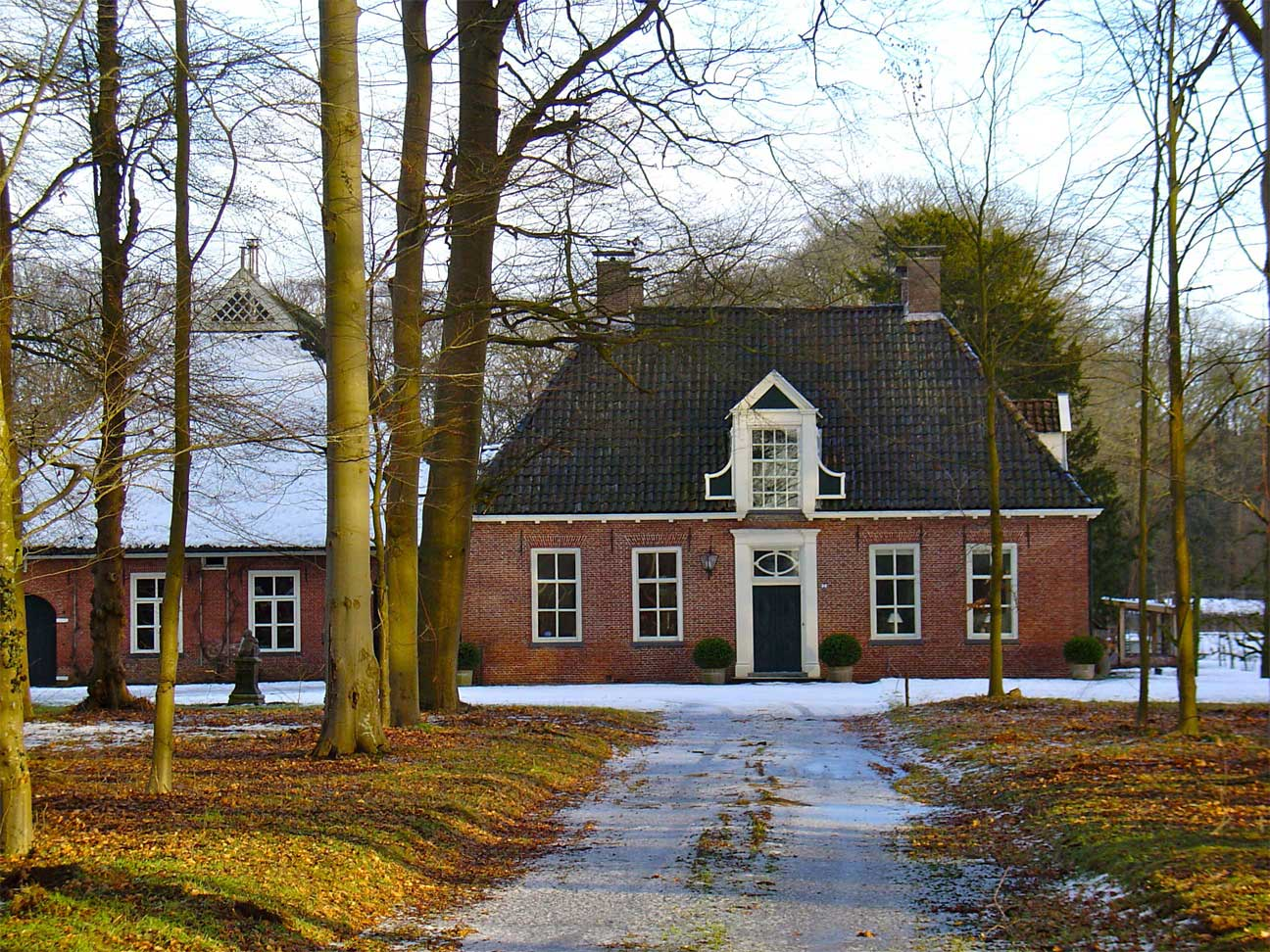
- Huis te Westervelde

- Location in province of Drenthe in the Netherlands Westervelde (Netherlands)
- Coordinates: 53°3′12″N 6°26′32″E
- Country: Netherlands
- Province: Drenthe
- Municipality: Noordenveld

Area
  - Total: 0.59 km^{2} (0.23 sq mi)
- Elevation: 9 m (30 ft)

Population (2021)
  - Total: 150
  - Density: 250/km^{2} (660/sq mi)
- Time zone: UTC+1 (CET)
  - Summer (DST): UTC+2 (CEST)
- Postal code: 9337
- Dialing code: 0592

Westervelde is a village in the Netherlands and part of the Noordenveld municipality in Drenthe.

== History ==
Westervelde is an esdorp which developed in the Middle Ages on higher grounds. The communal pasture of the village is triangular. It was first mentioned in 1484 as Westeruelde. The name means western field. It was established as a daughter settlement of Norg.

Huis te Westervelde or Tonckensborg dates from the 17th century, but has been extensively rebuilt in the late 18th century. Since 1709, it was home to the Tonckens family. It is currently in use as an hotel. Other nobility also built estates in Westervelde. The whole village has been designated a protected area.

Westervelde is the site of a Neolithic burial site called hunebed (Dolmen) D2 which is located near the Norgerholt forest. Originally, it had four covering stones, but only two remain. The area around Westervelde is characterised by large forests and agricultural fields, and mainly has a recreational use.

== Gallery ==
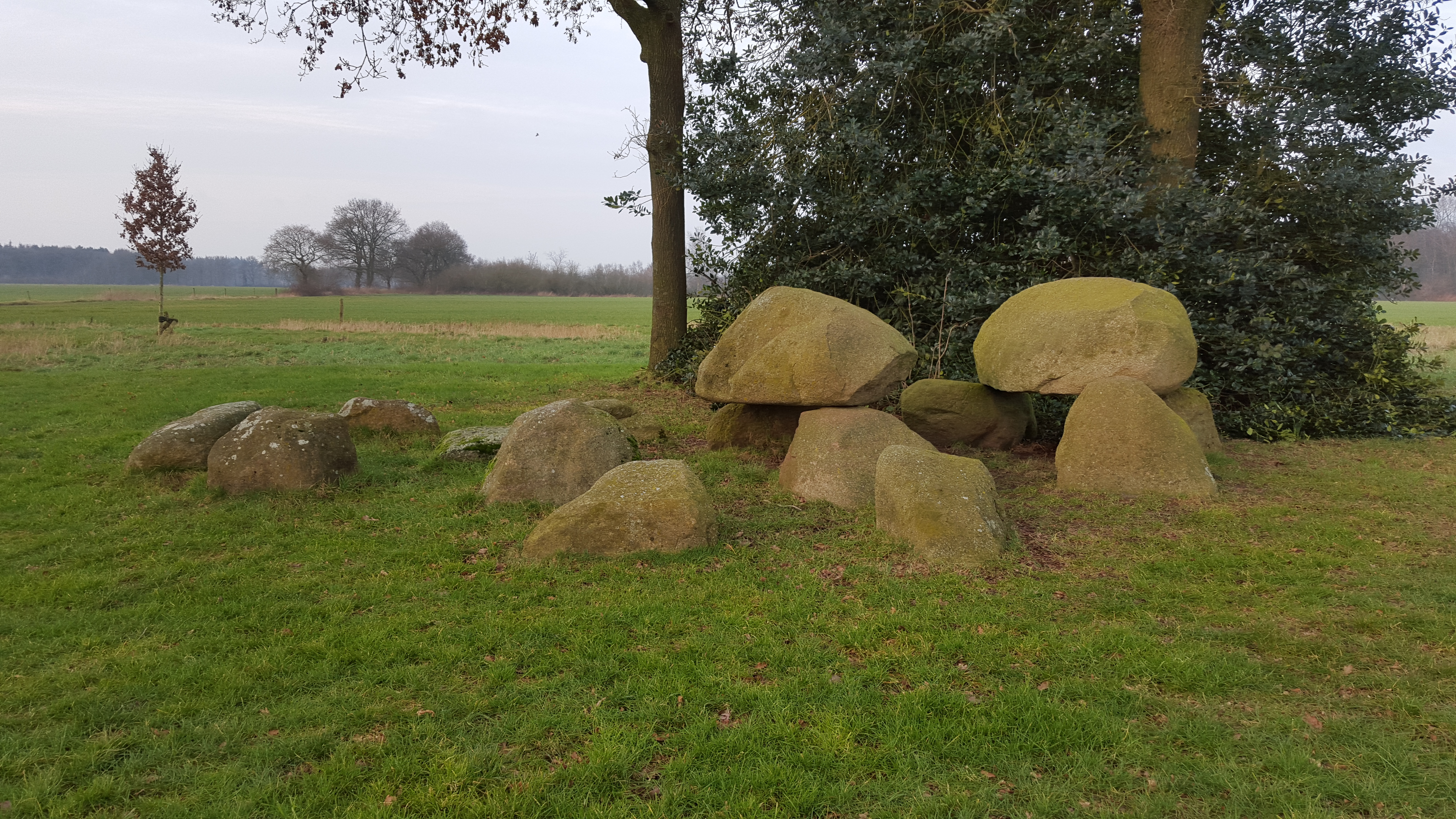
Dolmen (hunebed) D2

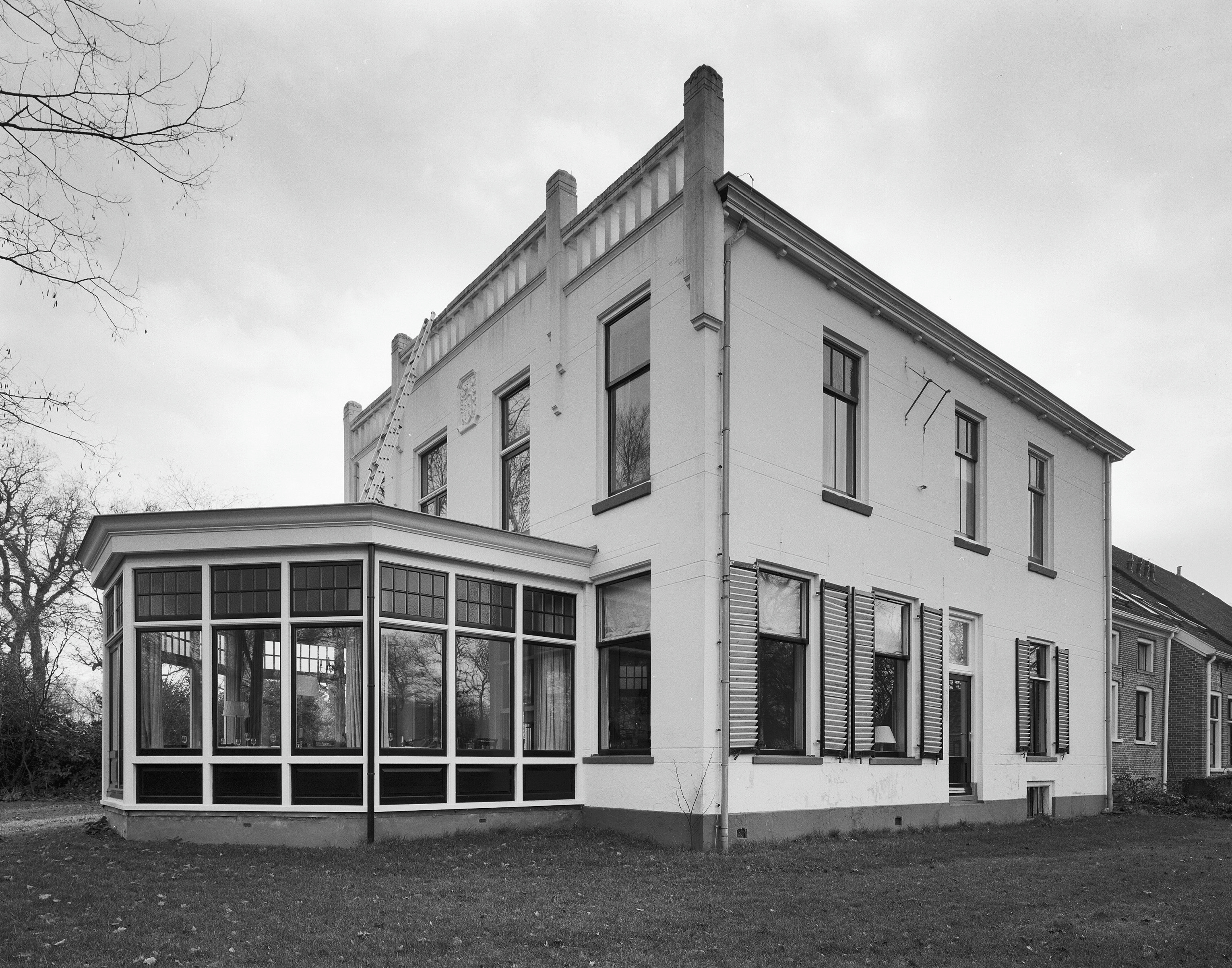
De Jufferen Lunsingh

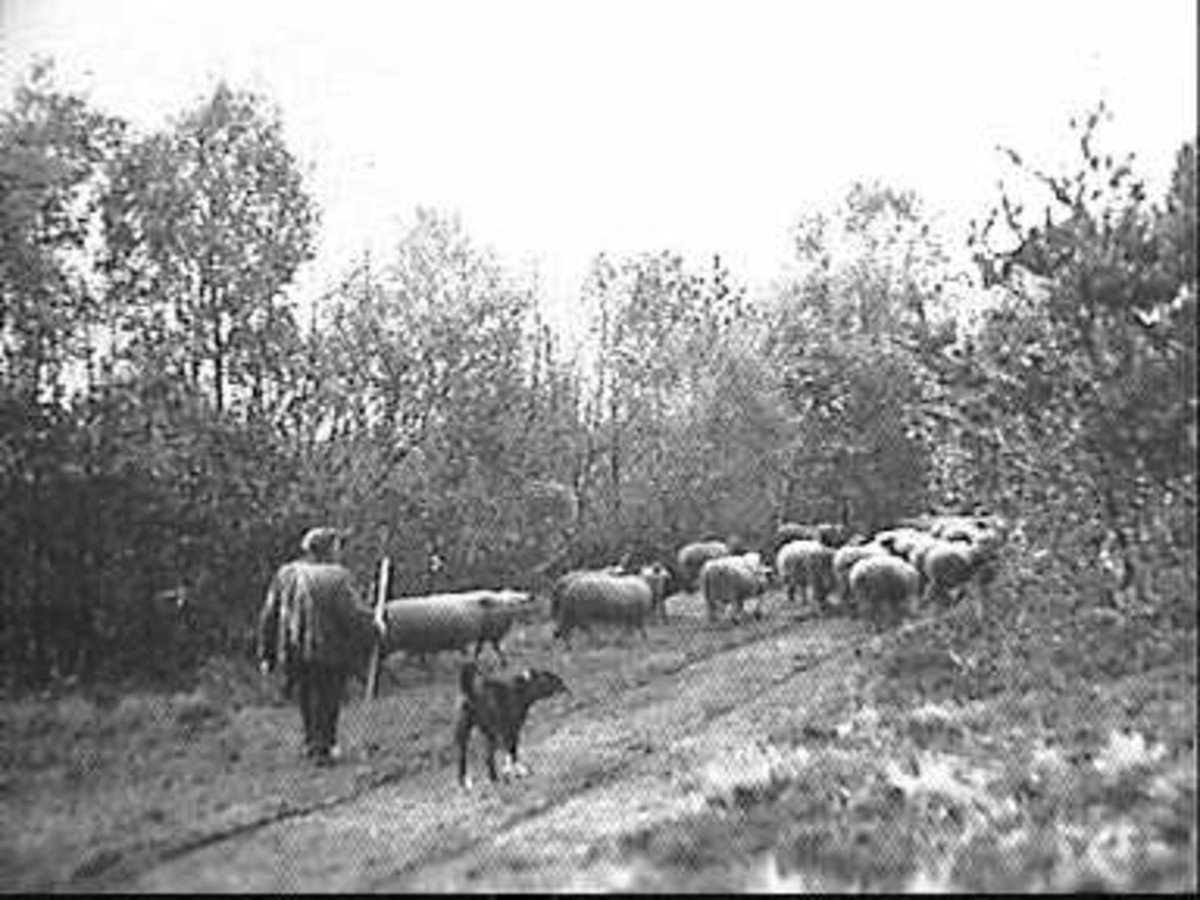
Shepherd with sheep (before 1942)

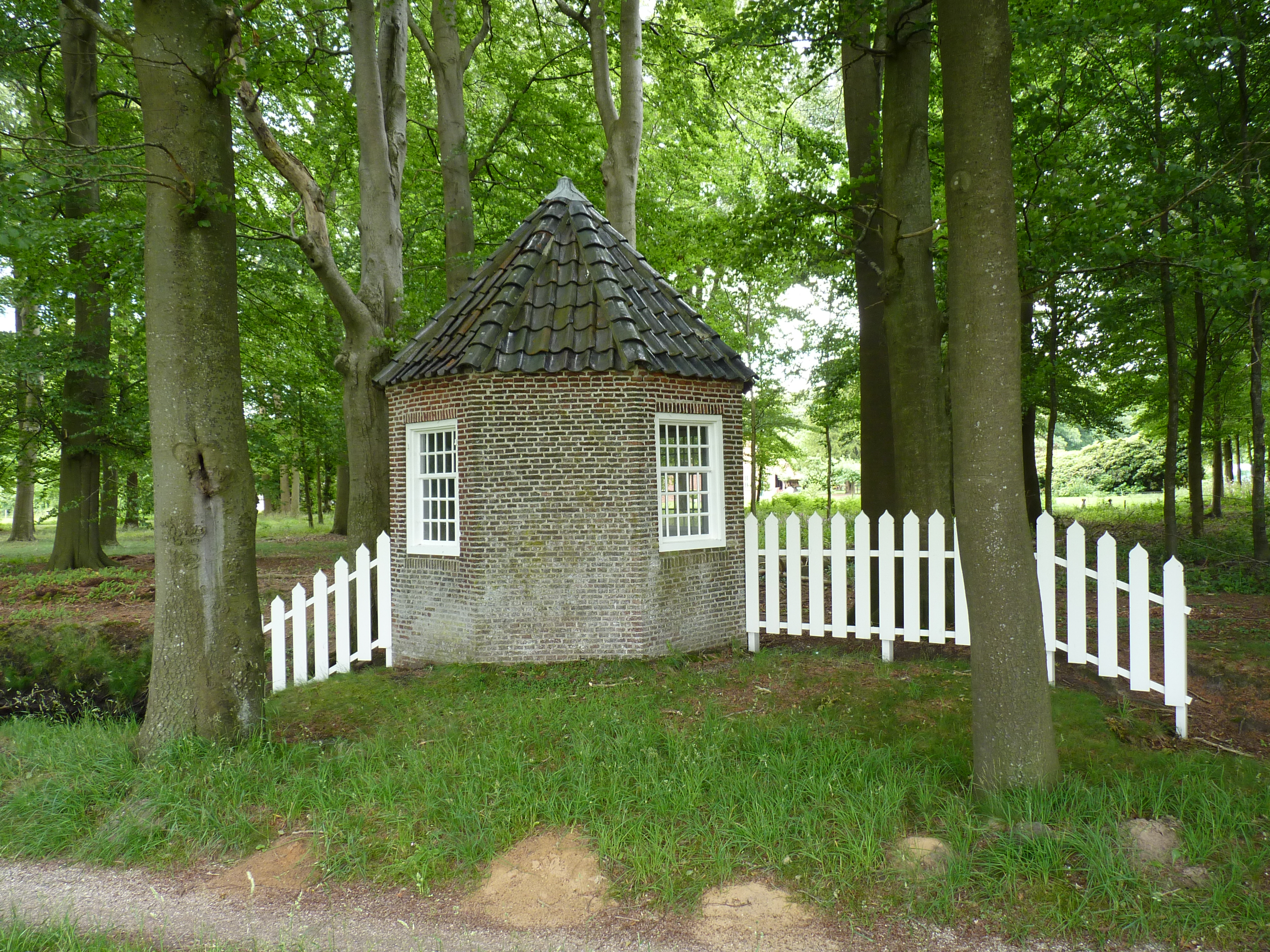
Garden cupola
