= Alting, Netherlands =

Alting
- Hamlet
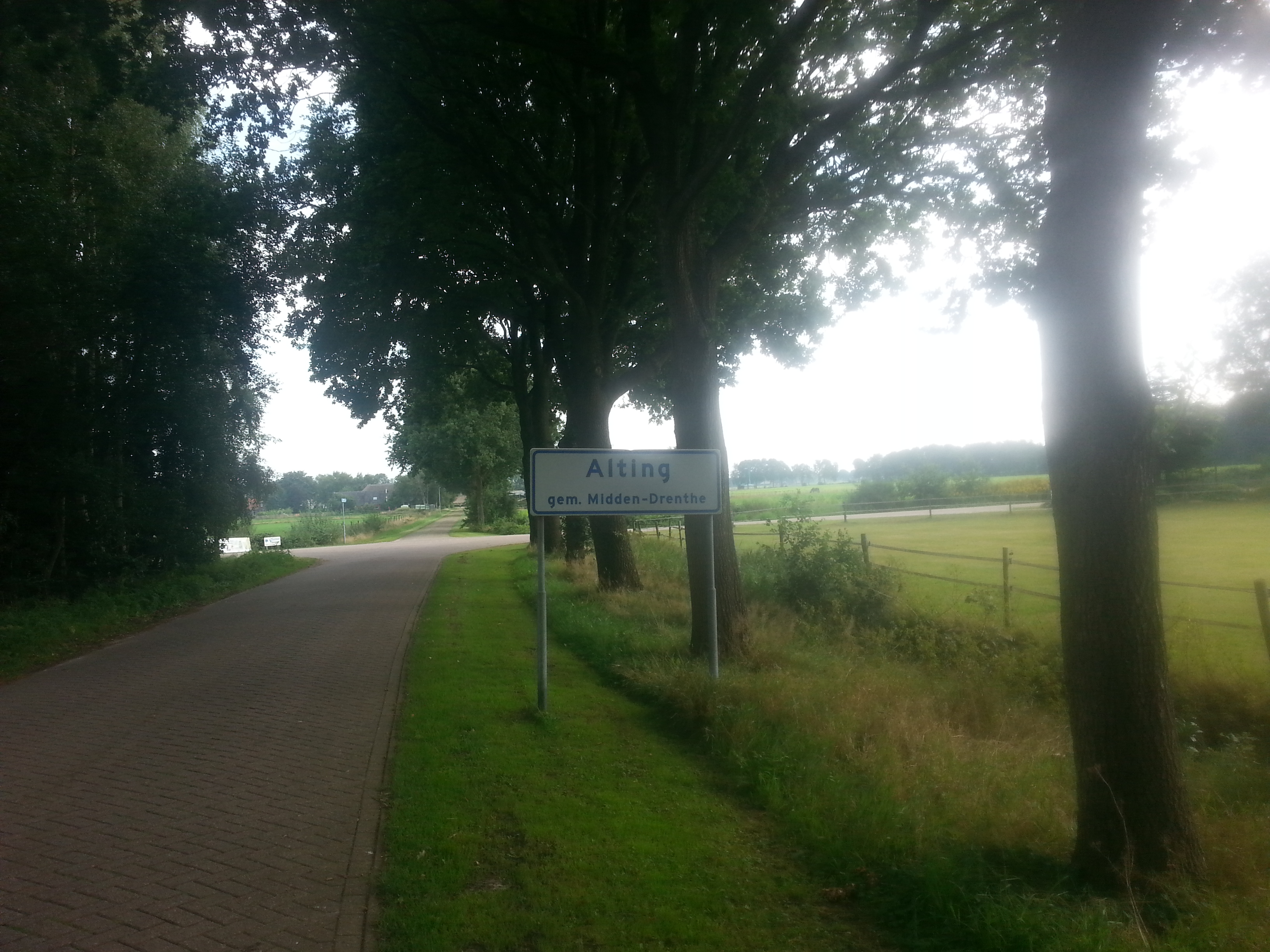
- Entry sign of Alting

- Location in the province of Drenthe in the Netherlands Alting (Netherlands)
- Coordinates: 52.86696°N 6.53872°E
- Country: Netherlands
- Province: Drenthe
- Municipality: Midden-Drenthe
- Village: Beilen
- Elevation: 12.5 m (41 ft)
- Time zone: UTC+1 (CET)
  - Summer (DST): UTC+2 (CEST)
- Postcode: 9411
- Area code: 0593

Alting (Dutch: [ˈɑl.tɪŋ]) is a hamlet in the municipality of Midden-Drenthe, in the province of Drenthe. It is located directly east of Beilen and south of the hamlet of Klatering.

== History ==
The hamlet was already mentioned in 1284, when it was named Altinghen. In 1372 the spelling Altynghe appeared, and in 1377 Altinghe. In 1781 the current spelling Alting appeared for the first time, but from 1851 to 1855 it was referred to as Aalling. The toponym is a derivation with the suffix -ingi from the personal name Alte, therefore meaning "at the people of Alte".

For a long time, the hamlet had only four farms, partly because it was situated on an es, a high-lying field, making expansion of the hamlet difficult. In 1840 the hamlet included six houses. In the twentieth century, the hamlet continued to grow. Until 1998 it belonged to the municipality of Beilen until it merged with the municipality of Middenveld (which is named Midden-Drenthe since 2000).
