= Middendorp =

- Hamlet
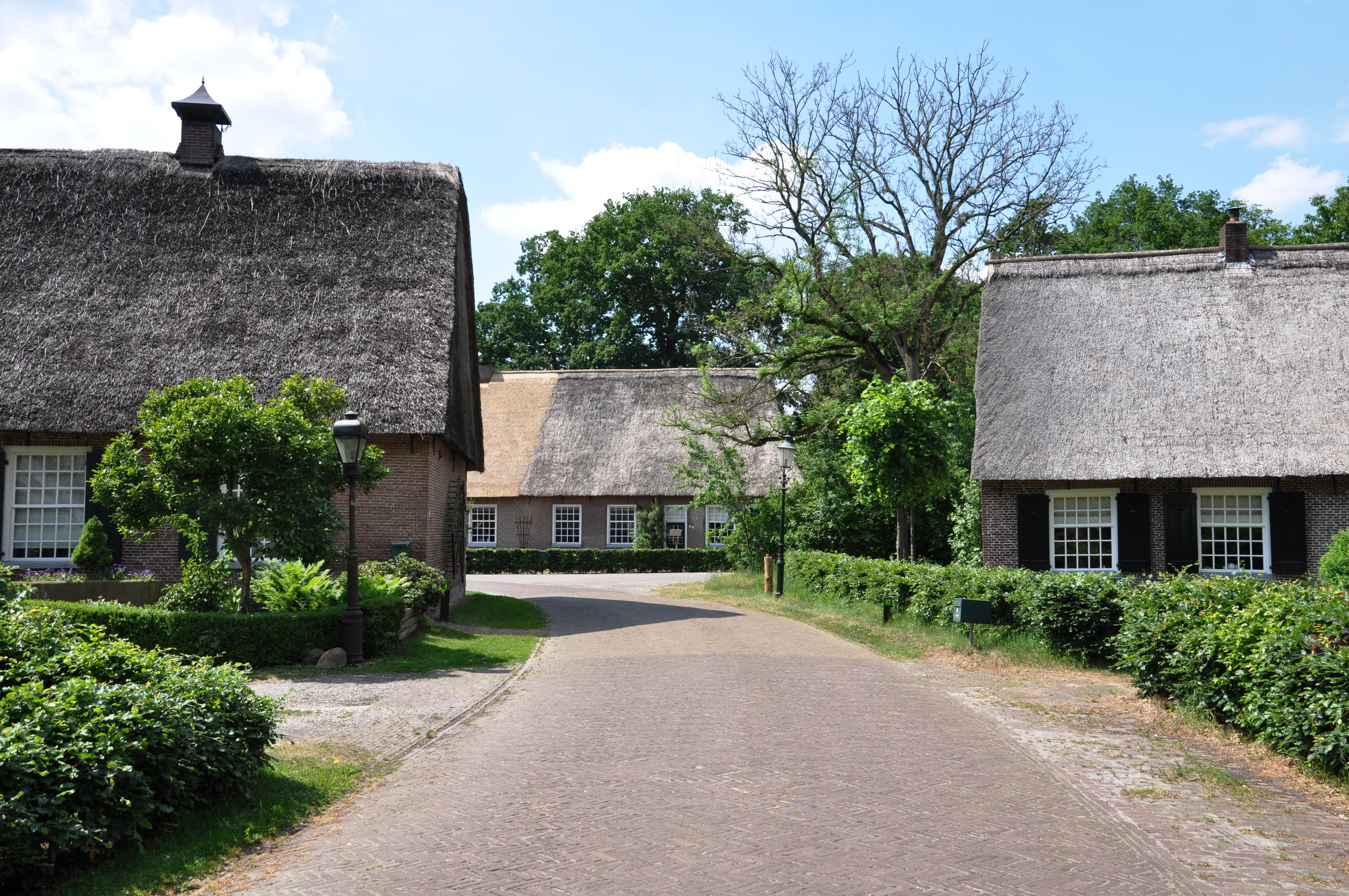
- Thatched houses in Middendorp

- Location in province of Drenthe in the Netherlands Middendorp (Netherlands)
- Coordinates: 52.6400°N 7.0145°E
- Country: Netherlands
- Province: Drenthe
- Municipality: Emmen

Area
  - Total: 1.29 km^{2} (0.50 sq mi)
- Elevation: 13 m (43 ft)

Population (2021)
  - Total: 195
  - Density: 151/km^{2} (392/sq mi)
- Time zone: UTC+1 (CET)
  - Summer (DST): UTC+2 (CEST)
- Postal code: 7761
- Dialing code: 0524

Middendorp is a hamlet in the Netherlands and is part of the Emmen municipality in Drenthe.

Middendorp has a statistical entry with Oosterse Bos, however the postal authorities have placed it under Schoonebeek. It was first mentioned in the 1850s as 't Middendorp. The name means "village in the middle".
