= Amsterdamscheveld =

- Hamlet
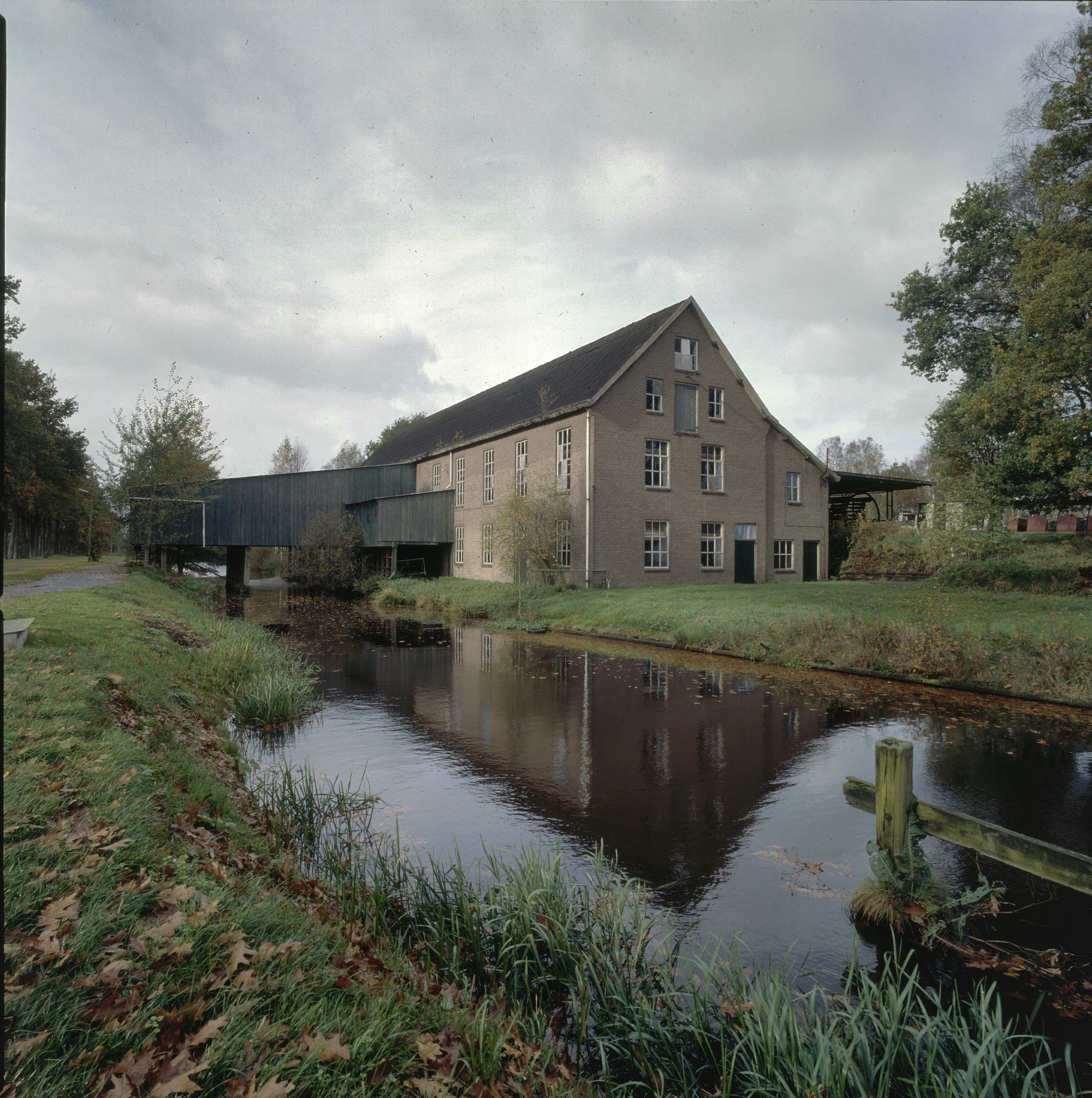
- Factory in Amsterdamscheveld

- Location in province of Drenthe in the Netherlands Amsterdamscheveld (Netherlands)
- Coordinates: 52.6871°N 6.9137°E
- Country: Netherlands
- Province: Drenthe
- Municipality: Emmen

Area
  - Total: 0.56 km^{2} (0.22 sq mi)
- Elevation: 16 m (52 ft)

Population (2021)
  - Total: 200
  - Density: 360/km^{2} (920/sq mi)
- Time zone: UTC+1 (CET)
  - Summer (DST): UTC+2 (CEST)
- Postal code: 7887
- Dialing code: 0591

Amsterdamscheveld is a hamlet in the Netherlands and is part of the Emmen municipality in Drenthe.

== Overview ==
In 1850, investors from Amsterdam purchased a 2.5 kilometres (1.6 mi) long piece of land for the exploitation of peat. In 1909, the land was bought by the Griendtsveen Turfstrooisel Mij who built a turf straw factory at the site. A hamlet for the workers was constructed along the canal. In 1932, it was home to 1,377 people.

Amsterdamscheveld is a statistical entity, however the postal authorities have placed it under Erica.

The narrow gauge industrial railway museum is located in Amsterdamscheveld, and uses tracks which were previously used by the factory.
