= Noordwijk, Drenthe =

Noordwijk
- Hamlet
- Location in province of Drenthe in the Netherlands Noordwijk (Netherlands)
- Coordinates: 52.682°N 6.296°E
- Country: Netherlands
- Province: Drenthe
- Municipality: De Wolden
- Elevation: 3 m (9.8 ft)
- Time zone: UTC+1 (CET)
  - Summer (DST): UTC+2 (CEST)
- Postal code: 7957
- Dialing code: 0522

Noordwijk (Dutch pronunciation: [ˈnoːrtʋɛik]) is a hamlet in the Dutch province of Drenthe. It is located in the municipality of De Wolden, about 1 km north of De Wijk, from which it derives its name.

Noordwijk is not a statistical entity, and the postal authorities have placed it under De Wijk. It was first mentioned in the 1850s, and means "north of De Wijk". It consists of about 30 houses.
