= Buinerveen =

- Village
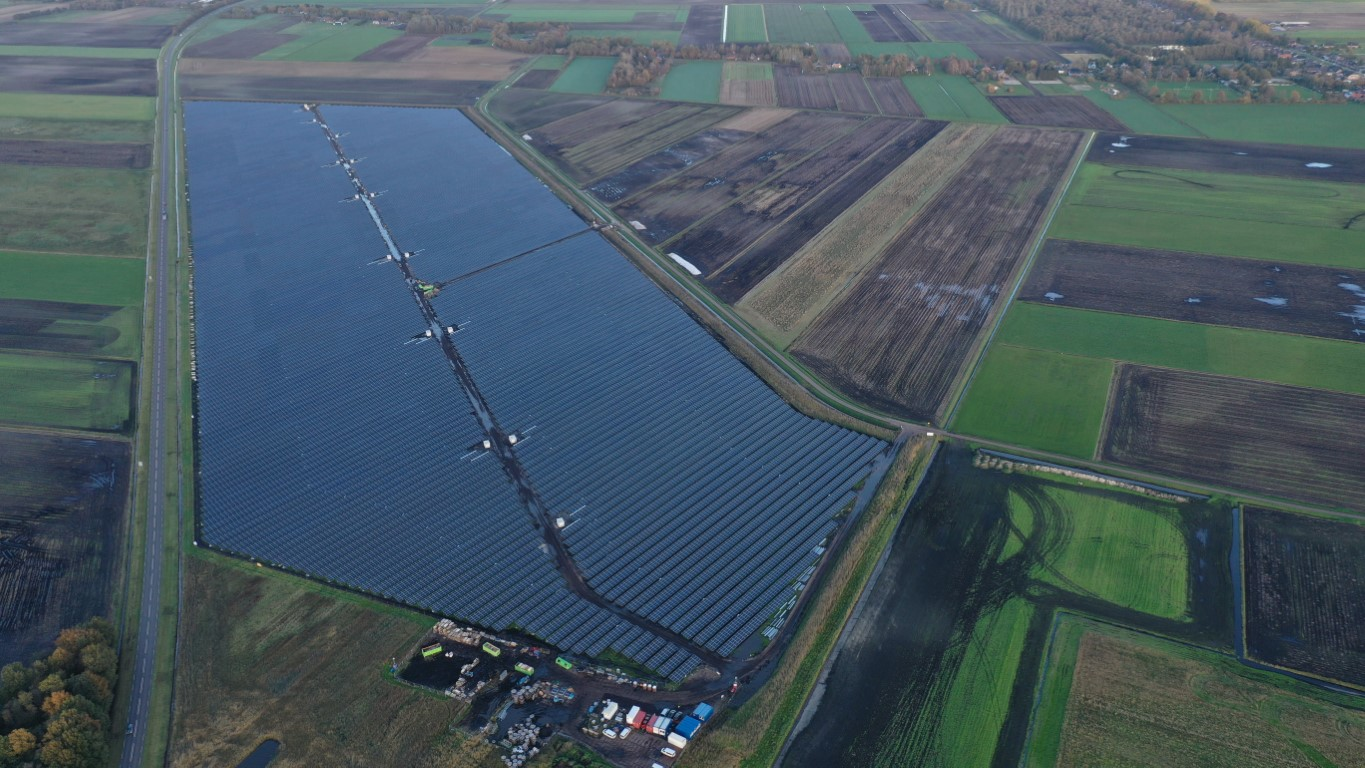
- Drone photo of the solar plant at Buinerveen

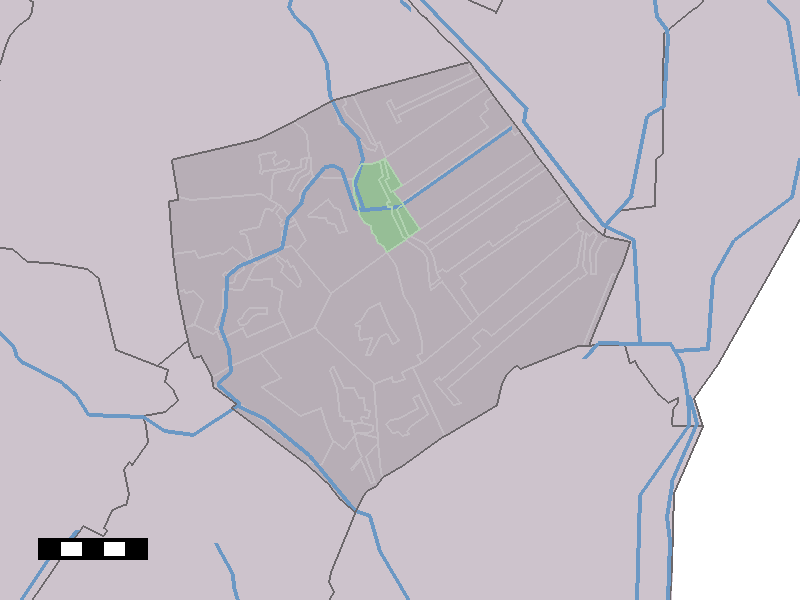
- Buinerveen in the municipality of Borger-Odoorn.

- Location of the village in the province of Groningen Buinerveen (Netherlands)
- Coordinates: 52°56′N 6°53′E
- Country: Netherlands
- Province: Drenthe
- Municipality: Borger-Odoorn

Area
  - Total: 7.83 km^{2} (3.02 sq mi)
- Elevation: 8 m (26 ft)

Population (2021)
  - Total: 430
  - Density: 55/km^{2} (140/sq mi)
- Time zone: UTC+1 (CET)
  - Summer (DST): UTC+2 (CEST)
- Postal code: 9524
- Dialing code: 0599

Buinerveen is a village in the Dutch province of Drenthe. It is a part of the municipality of Borger-Odoorn, and lies about 18 km north of Emmen.

The village was first mentioned in 1762 as Bunerveen, and means "raised bog belonging to Buinen". Buinerveen was a former peat colony. Later it developed into an agricultural community.

Buinerveen was home to 205 people in 1840.
