= Westdorp =

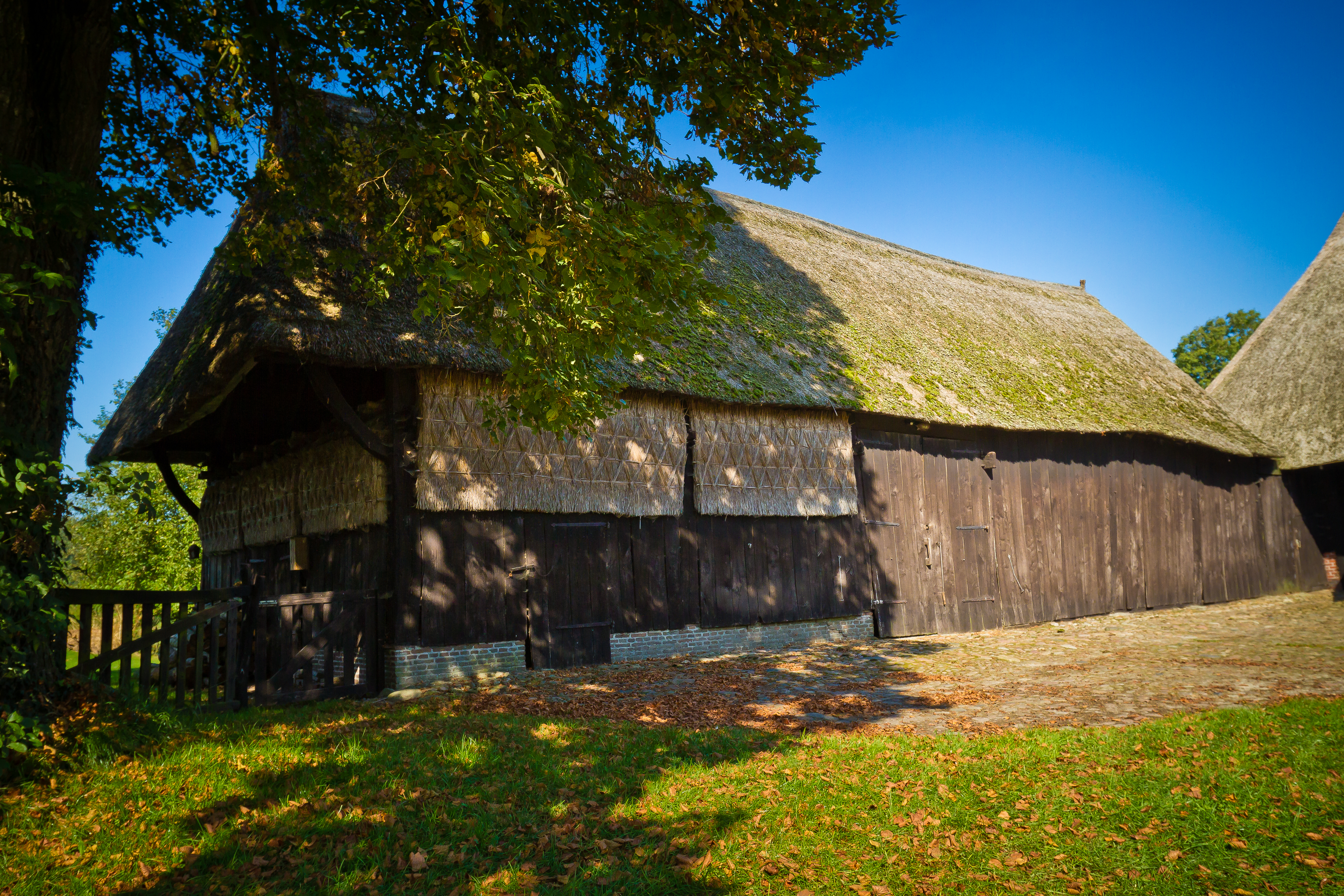
- Farm in Westdorp

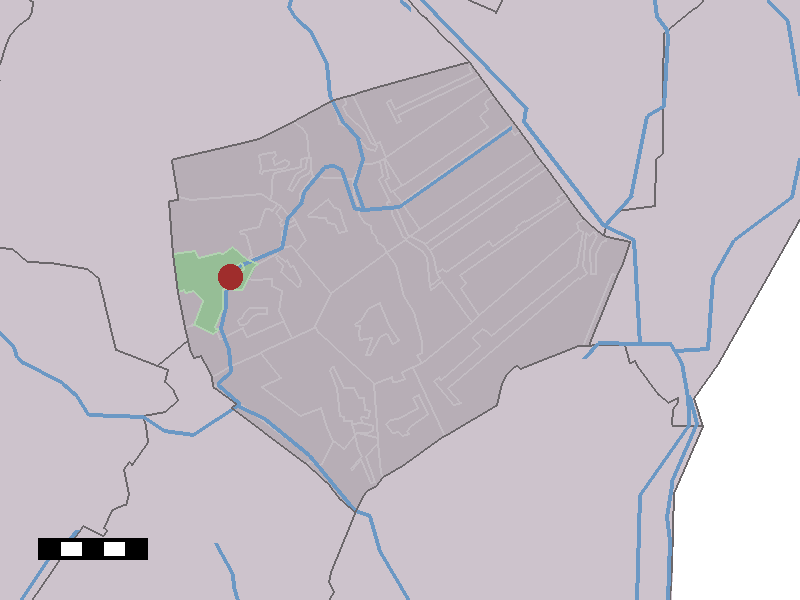
- The village (dark red) and the statistical district (light green) of Westdorp in the municipality of Borger-Odoorn.

- Location of the village in the province of Drenthe Westdorp (Netherlands)
- Coordinates: 52°54′N 6°46′E
- Country: Netherlands
- Province: Drenthe
- Municipality: Borger-Odoorn

Area
  - Total: 6.09 km^{2} (2.35 sq mi)
- Elevation: 15 m (49 ft)

Population (2021)
  - Total: 135
  - Density: 22.2/km^{2} (57.4/sq mi)
- Time zone: UTC+1 (CET)
  - Summer (DST): UTC+2 (CEST)
- Postal code: 9534
- Dialing code: 0591

Westdorp is a village in the Dutch province of Drenthe. It is a part of the municipality of Borger-Odoorn, and lies about 17 km northwest of Emmen.

== History ==
The village was first mentioned between 1381 and 1383 as "to Westorpe", and means "western village" as viewed from Ees. Westdorp was home to 95 people in 1840.

In 2002, a subsidy of €450,000 was granted to repair an hunebed (dolmen) in Borger. The farmers of Westdorp gathered big boulders, the heaviest weight 8 tonnes, and built their own hunebed in the village square. The municipality did not know what to make it of it, but did grant a building permits afterwards.
