= Eesergroen =

- Village
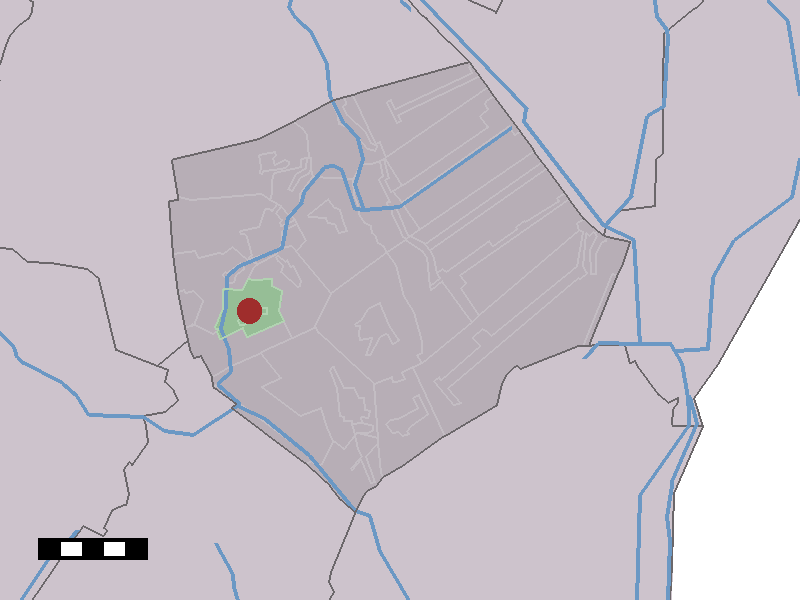
- The village (dark red) and the statistical district (light green) of Eesergroen in the municipality of Borger-Odoorn.

- Location of the village in the province of Drenthe Eesergroen (Netherlands)
- Coordinates: 52°53′N 6°47′E
- Country: Netherlands
- Province: Drenthe
- Municipality: Borger-Odoorn
- Established: 1882

Area
  - Total: 6.56 km^{2} (2.53 sq mi)
- Elevation: 16 m (52 ft)

Population (2021)
  - Total: 170
  - Density: 26/km^{2} (67/sq mi)
- Time zone: UTC+1 (CET)
  - Summer (DST): UTC+2 (CEST)
- Postal code: 9537
- Dialing code: 0599

Eesergroen is a village in the Dutch province of Drenthe. It is a part of the municipality of Borger-Odoorn, and lies about 16 km northwest of Emmen.

The village was first mentioned in 1942 as "Eesergroen of Eesgroen", and means "trees belonging to Ees. In 1882, the first house was built to cultivate the wilderness. In 1930, a canal was dug and the large scale cultivation of the area started.

In 1917, the Maranatha chapel was built by the Rechtzinnig Hervormde Kerk, a Christian fundamentalist congregation. It was decommissioned in 1975 and is now used by an auto workshop. In 1956, a church was built by the Vrijzinnig Hervormde Kerk, a liberal Christianity congregation. It was decommissioned in 1969, and now serves as a holiday home.
