= Eeserveen =

- Village
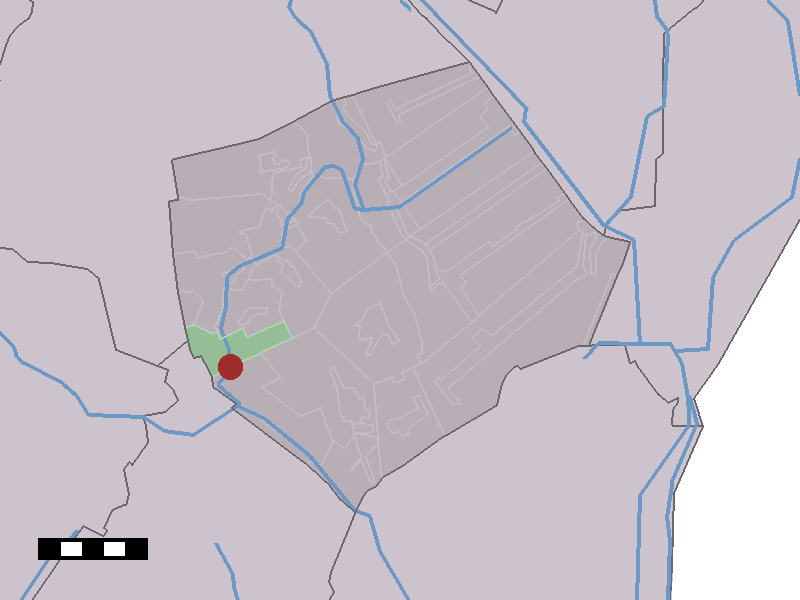
- The village (dark red) and the statistical district (light green) of Eeserveen in the municipality of Borger-Odoorn.

- Location in the Netherlands Eeserveen (Netherlands)
- Coordinates: 52°52′2″N 6°45′50″E
- Country: Netherlands
- Province: Drenthe
- Municipality: Borger-Odoorn

Area
  - Total: 7.19 km^{2} (2.78 sq mi)
- Elevation: 16 m (52 ft)

Population (2021)
  - Total: 160
  - Density: 22/km^{2} (58/sq mi)
- Time zone: UTC+1 (CET)
  - Summer (DST): UTC+2 (CEST)
- Postal code: 7858
- Dialing code: 0599

Eeserveen is a village in the Dutch province of Drenthe. It is a part of the municipality of Borger-Odoorn, and lies about 14 km northwest of Emmen.

The village was first mentioned between 1851 and 1855 as Eesterveen, and means "peat excavation settlement belonging to Ees". The excavation of the peat started around 1870. It used to consists mainly of sod houses which were later replaced by stone houses.

Until 1997, the village was split between Borger and Odoorn. In 1998, it became part of the municipality of Borger-Odoorn.

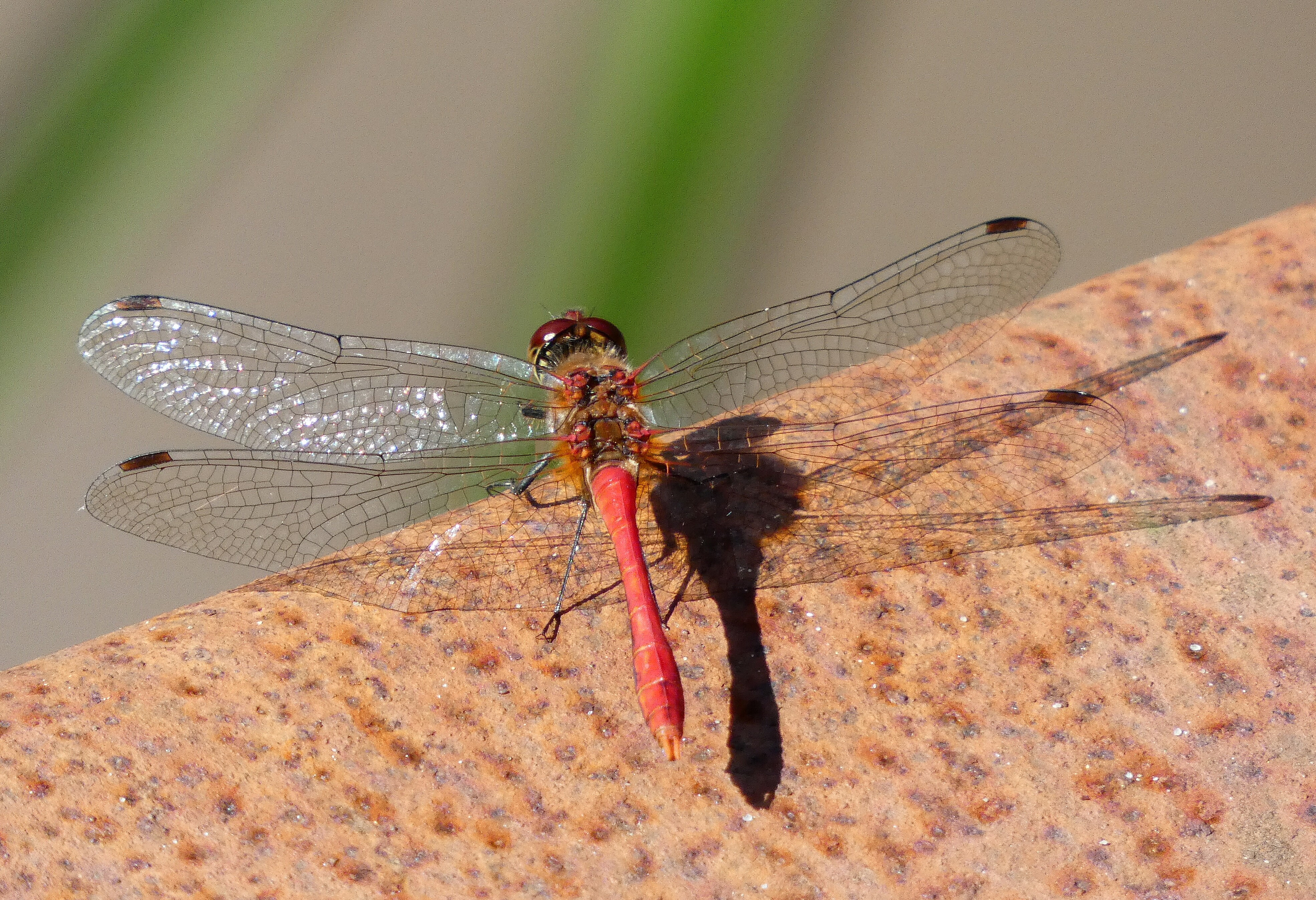
A dragonfly (Sympetrum sanguineum) in Eeserveen
