= Drouwenerveen =

- Village
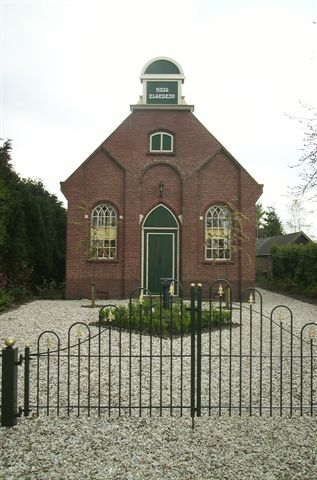
- Church

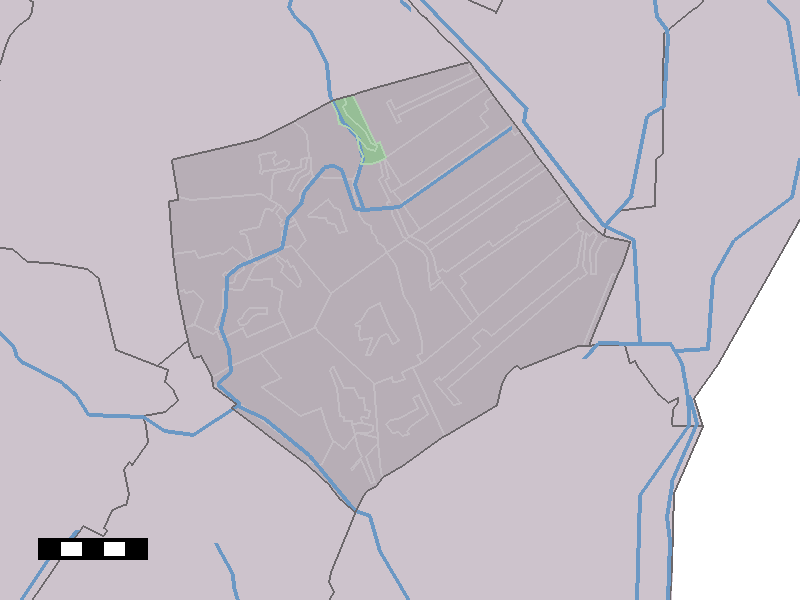
- Drouwenerveen in the municipality of Borger-Odoorn.

- Location of the village in the province of Drenthe Drouwenerveen (Netherlands)
- Coordinates: 52°58′N 6°51′E
- Country: Netherlands
- Province: Drenthe
- Municipality: Borger-Odoorn

Area
  - Total: 3.32 km^{2} (1.28 sq mi)
- Elevation: 6 m (20 ft)

Population (2021)
  - Total: 275
  - Density: 82.8/km^{2} (215/sq mi)
- Time zone: UTC+1 (CET)
  - Summer (DST): UTC+2 (CEST)
- Postal code: 9525
- Dialing code: 0599

Drouwenerveen is a village in the Dutch province of Drenthe. It is a part of the municipality of Borger-Odoorn and lies about 20 km east of Assen.

The village was first mentioned in 1781 as "Gasselter en Drouwer Veenen", which means "the peat area belonging to Drouwen". Drouwererveen originated as a peat excavation village around 1820, and developed into a linear settlement along the road from Drouwen.

As of 1840, the village had a population of 305 residents. The Dutch Reformed church, built around 1915, has since been converted into a residential house.
