= Bronnegerveen =

Bronnegerveen Brönnegerveen
- Hamlet
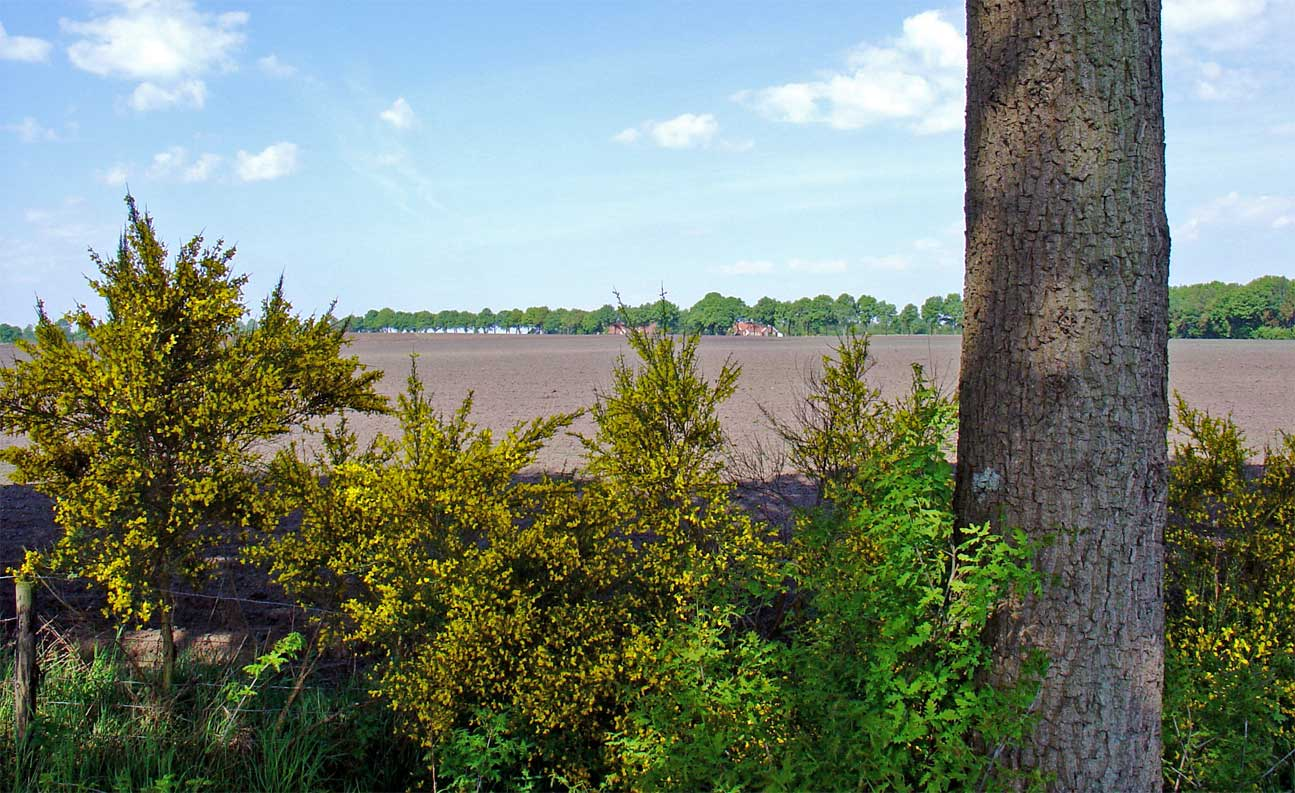
- View on the Hondsrug in Bronnegerveen

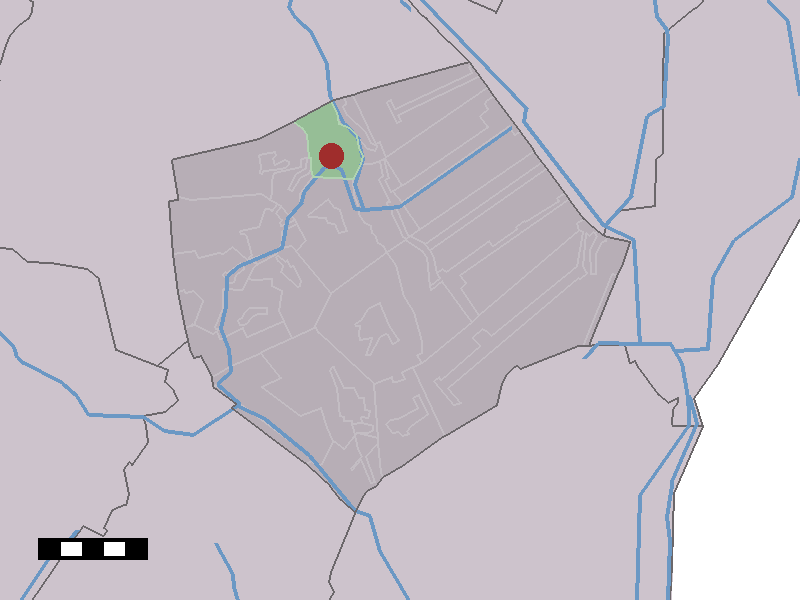
- The village (dark red) and the statistical district (light green) of Bronnegerveen in the municipality of Borger-Odoorn.
- Coordinates: 52°57′N 6°50′E
- Country: Netherlands
- Province: Drenthe
- Municipality: Borger-Odoorn

Area
  - Total: 7.21 km^{2} (2.78 sq mi)
  - Land: 7.16 km^{2} (2.76 sq mi)
  - Water: 0.05 km^{2} (0.019 sq mi)
- Elevation: 9 m (30 ft)

Population (2021)
  - Total: 85
  - Density: 12/km^{2} (31/sq mi)
- Time zone: UTC+1 (CET)
  - Summer (DST): UTC+2 (CEST)
- Postal code: 9526
- Dialing code: 0599

Bronnegerveen is a hamlet in the Dutch province of Drenthe. It is a part of the municipality of Borger-Odoorn, and lies about 19 km east of Assen.

The hamlet was first mentioned in 1936 as Bronnegerveen, and means "peat excavation village near Bronneger". The settlement started around 1750. A century later, it became a peat excavation village.
