= Ellertshaar =

- Hamlet
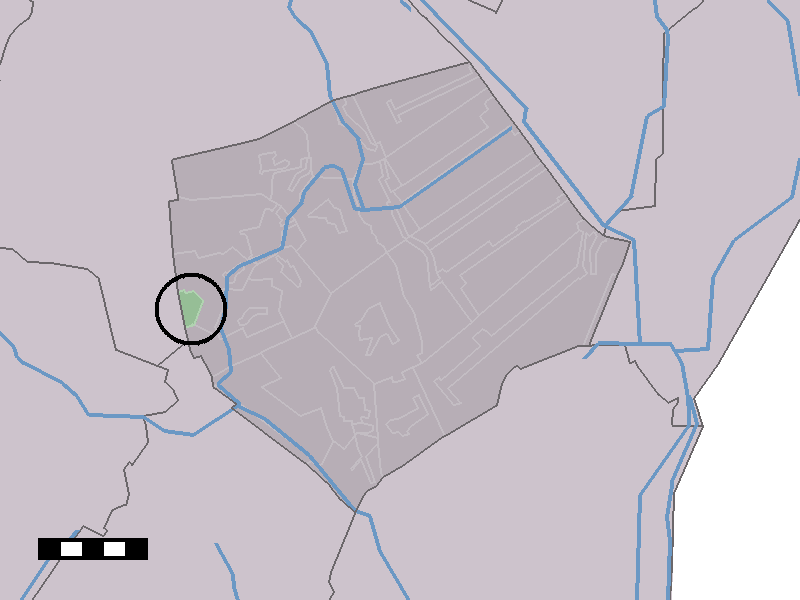
- Ellertshaar in the municipality of Borger-Odoorn.

- Location in the Netherlands Ellertshaar (Netherlands)
- Coordinates: 52°54′N 6°44′E
- Country: Netherlands
- Province: Drenthe
- Municipality: Borger-Odoorn

Area
  - Total: 2.38 km^{2} (0.92 sq mi)
- Elevation: 17 m (56 ft)

Population (2021)
  - Total: 30
  - Density: 13/km^{2} (33/sq mi)
- Time zone: UTC+1 (CET)
  - Summer (DST): UTC+2 (CEST)
- Postal code: 9535
- Dialing code: 0599

Ellertshaar is a hamlet in the Dutch province of Drenthe. It is a part of the municipality of Borger-Odoorn, and lies about 17 km southeast of Assen.

The hamlet was first mentioned in 1851 as Eldershaar, and means "alder trees on a sandy ridge". Ellershaar was home to 8 people in 1840.
