= Drouwenermond =

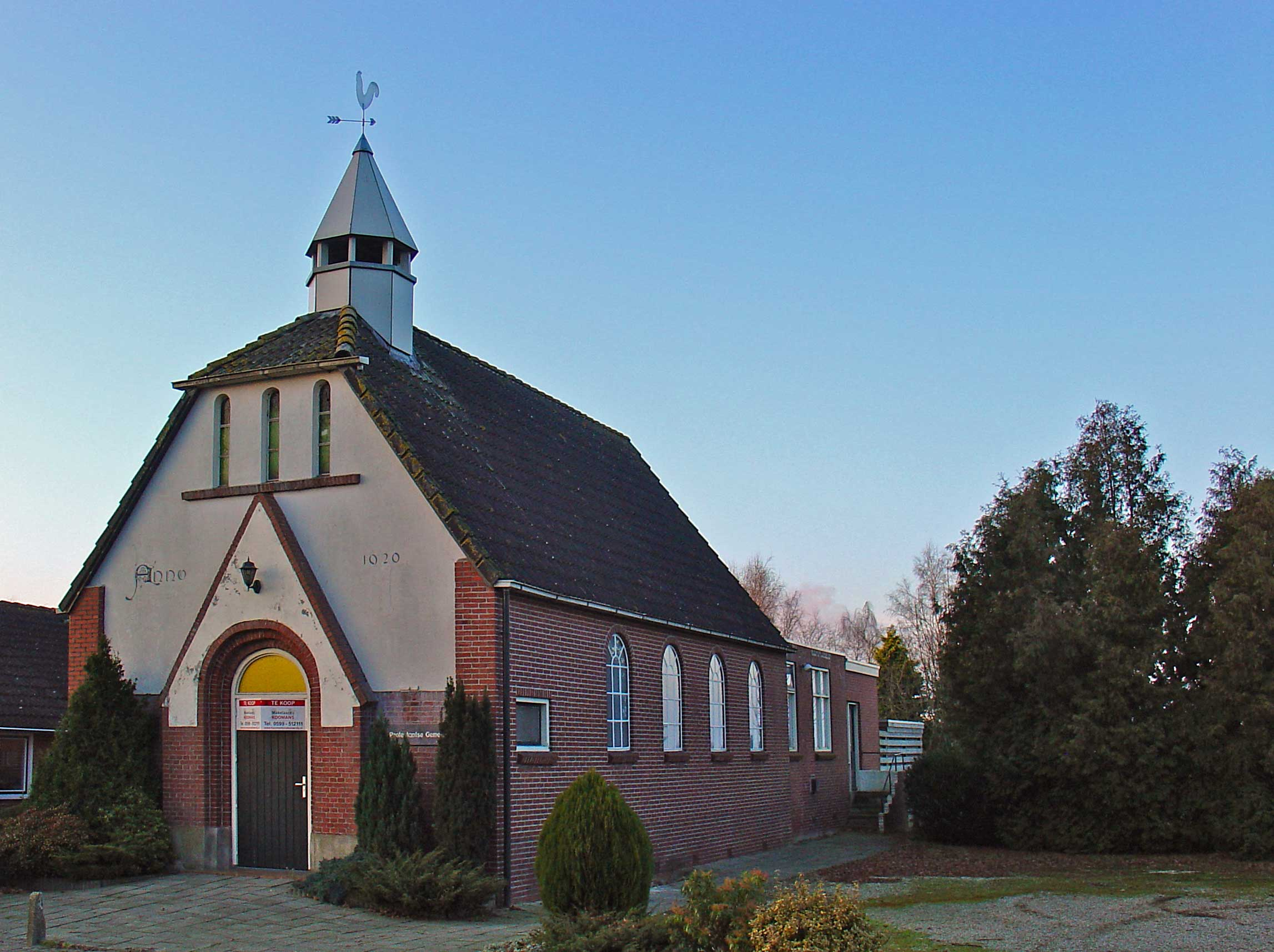
- Church of Drouwenermond

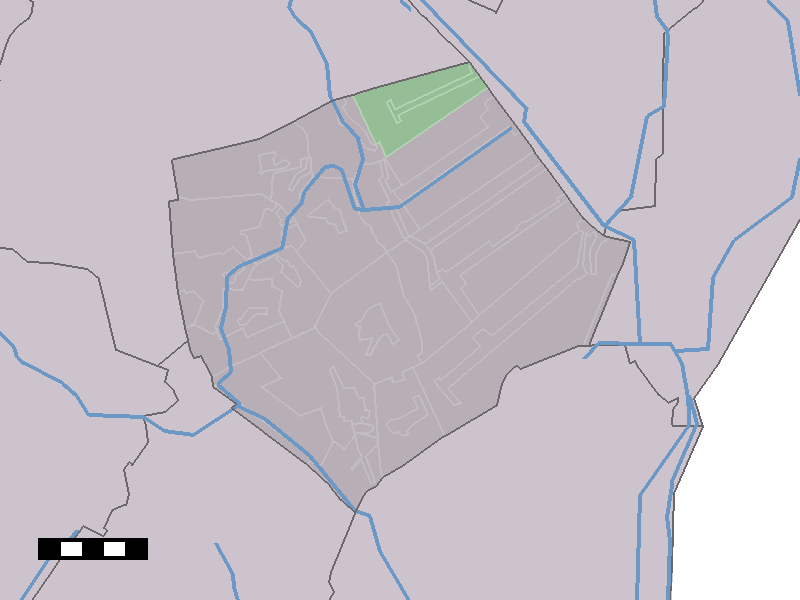
- Drouwenermond in the municipality of Borger-Odoorn.

- Location of the village in the province of Drenthe Drouwenermond (Netherlands)
- Coordinates: 52°59′N 6°54′E
- Country: Netherlands
- Province: Drenthe
- Municipality: Borger-Odoorn

Area
  - Total: 13.19 km^{2} (5.09 sq mi)
- Elevation: 6 m (20 ft)

Population (2021)
  - Total: 585
  - Density: 44.4/km^{2} (115/sq mi)
- Time zone: UTC+1 (CET)
  - Summer (DST): UTC+2 (CEST)
- Postal code: 9523
- Dialing code: 0599

Drouwenermond is a village in the Dutch province of Drenthe. It is a part of the municipality of Borger-Odoorn, and lies about 23 km north of Emmen.

The village was first mentioned in 1841 as "Drouwender-Mond of Drouwener-Mond", and means "(canal) which has its mouth (at a main canal) belonging to Drouwen". It refers to an eponymous canal which was dug in 1822 to excavate the peat in the area. In 1817, the Province of Groningen permits Drenthe to transport peat through their province and dig canals towards the Stadskanaal.

A church was built in 1920. In 2008, the building was decommissioned. Nobody was willing to buy the church and transform it into residential homes or offices. The neighbour only wanted the land, and the church was demolished in 2010.

Drouwenermond was home to 170 people in 1840.

== Gallery ==
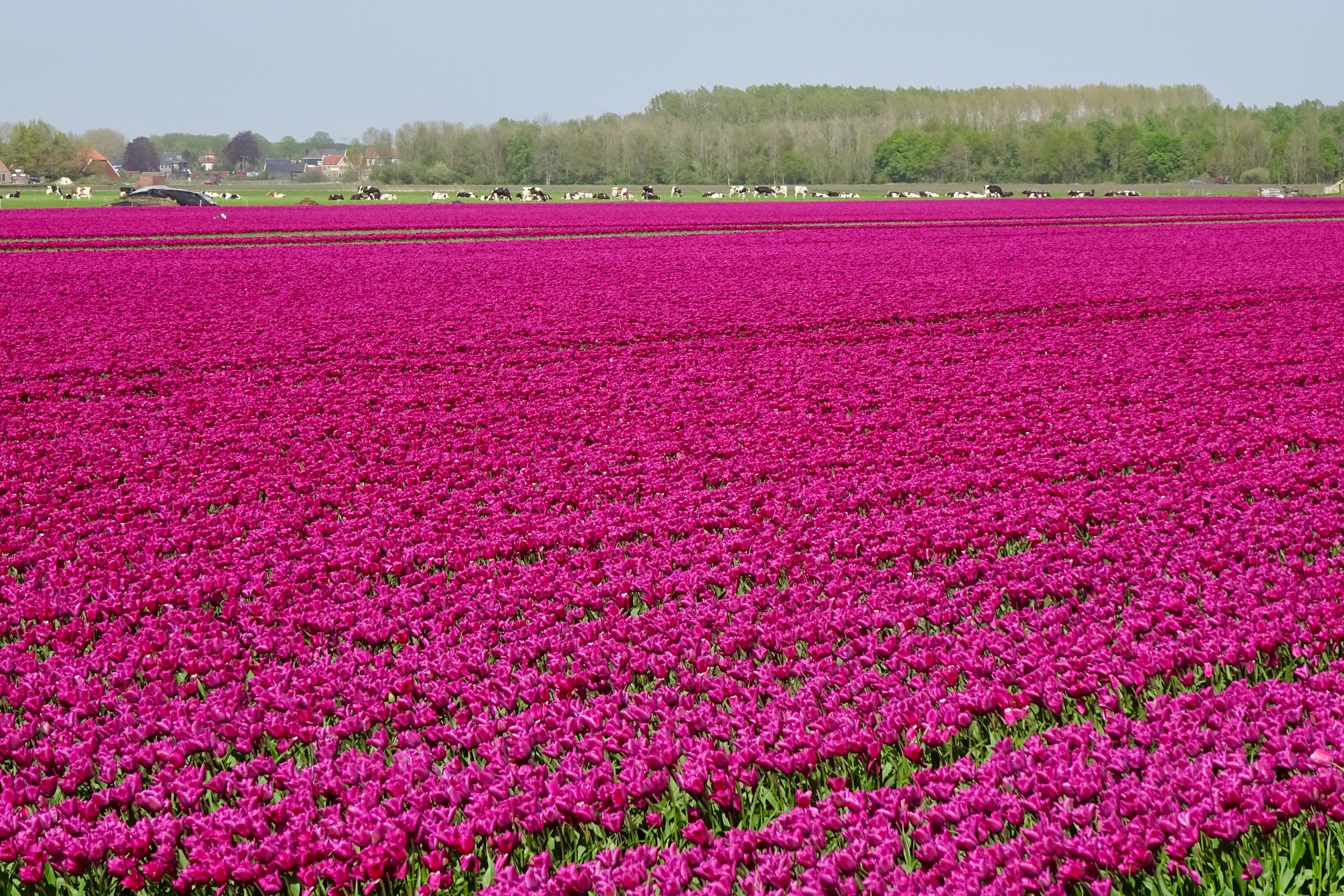
Tulip field

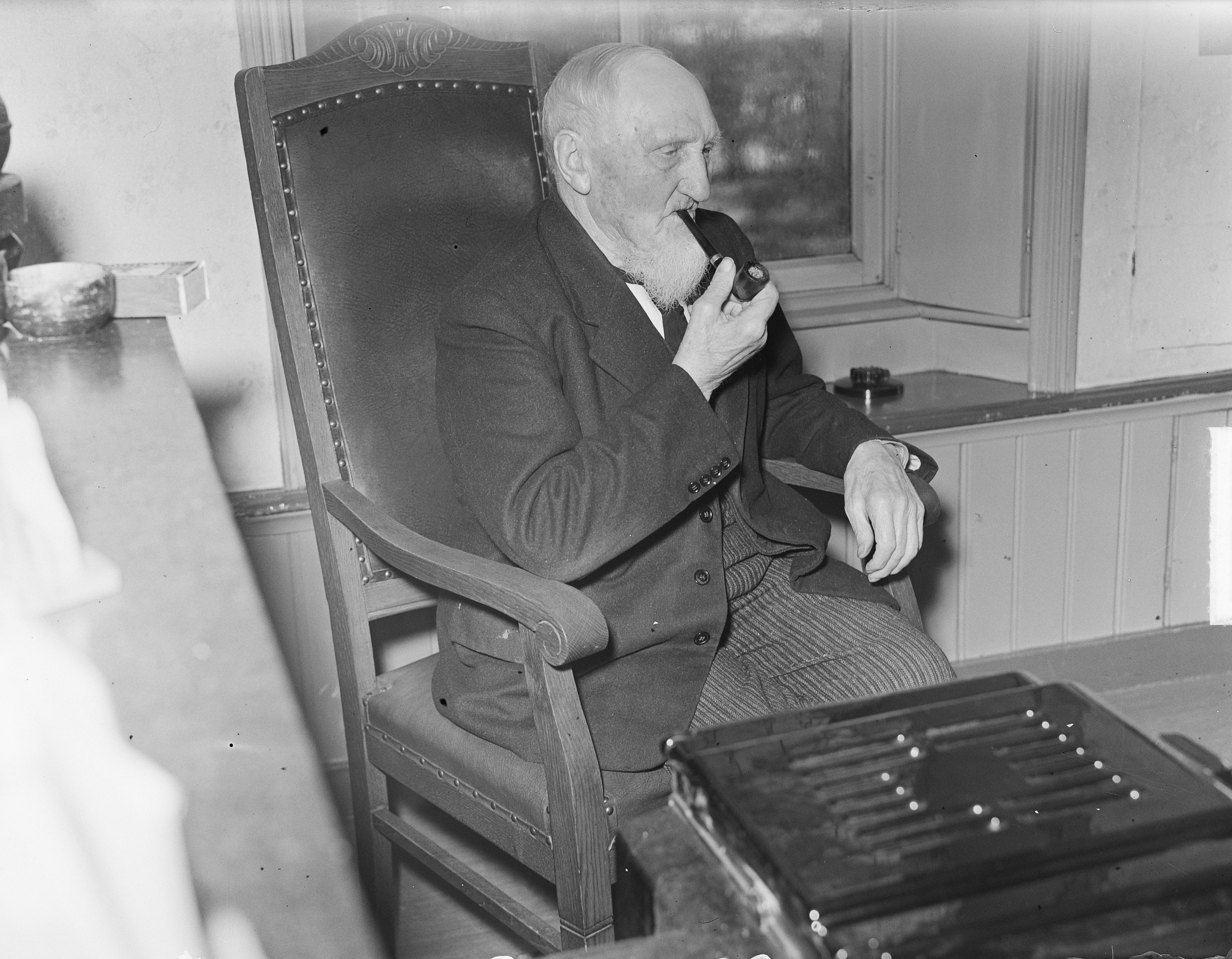
Grandpa Reiling (104) from Drouwenermond smokes his pipe
