= 1e Exloërmond =

1e Exloërmond Eerste Exloërmond
- Village
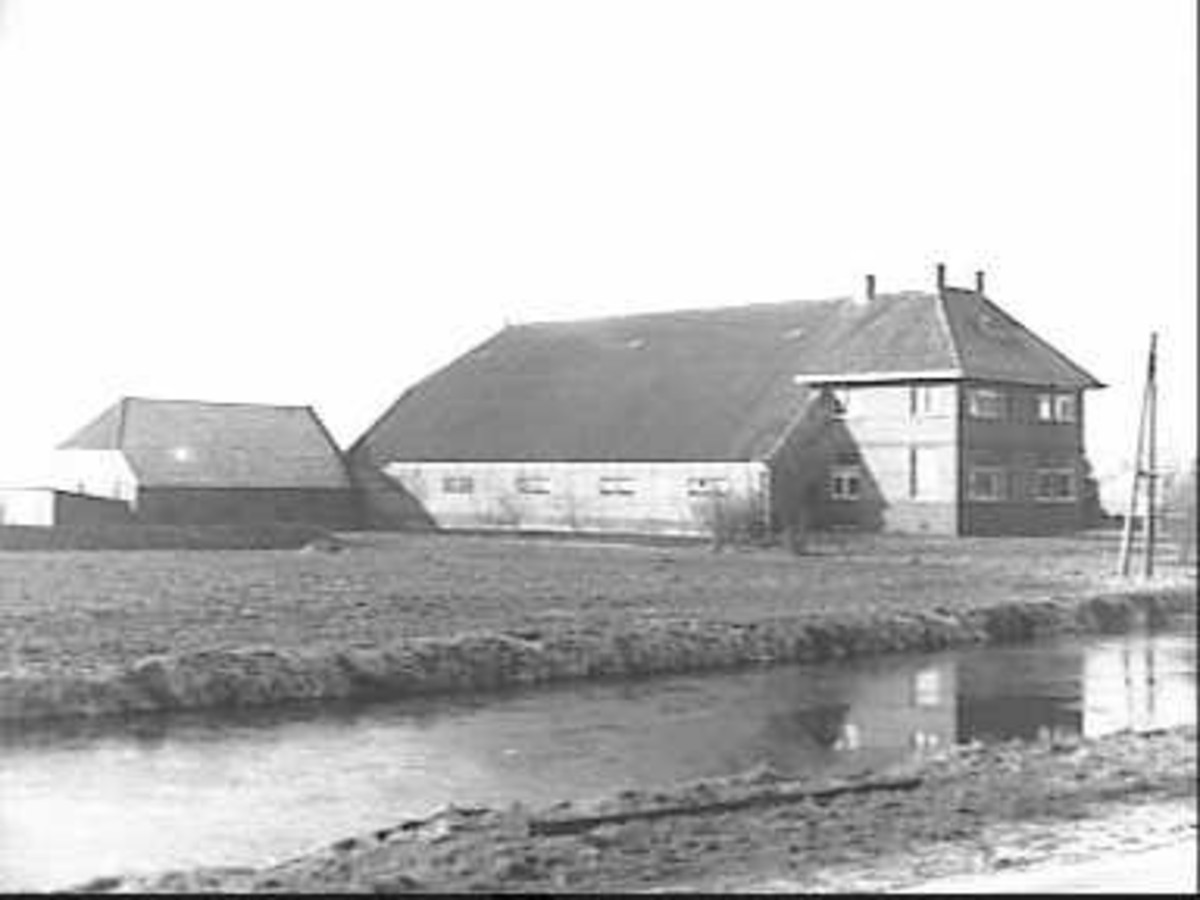
- Farm in 1959

- Location in the province of Drenthe in the Netherlands 1e Exloërmond (Netherlands)
- Coordinates: 52°56′N 6°56′E
- Country: Netherlands
- Province: Drenthe
- Municipality: Borger-Odoorn

Area
  - Total: 11.62 km^{2} (4.49 sq mi)
- Elevation: 9 m (30 ft)

Population (2021)
  - Total: 375
  - Density: 32.3/km^{2} (83.6/sq mi)
- Time zone: UTC+1 (CET)
  - Summer (DST): UTC+2 (CEST)
- Postal code: 9573
- Dialing code: 0599

1e Exloërmond (Dutch pronunciation: [ˈeːrstə ˈʔɛksloːərˌmɔnt]; before 2009: Eerste Exloërmond) is a village in the Dutch province of Drenthe. It is a part of the municipality of Borger-Odoorn, and lies about 18 km north of Emmen.

The village was first mentioned between 1851 and 1855 as "Noorder Hoofddiep of Exlooder Mond", and means "first (canal) that has his mouth (at the main canal) belonging to Exloo". It refers to a peat colony which is located at the eponymous canal which was dug in 1829. 1e (first) has been added to distinguish between 2e Exloërmond. It was settled from Musselkanaal. In 2009, the village was officially renamed 1e Exloërmond.

In 1817, permission was given by Groningen to transport the peat of Drenthe to the "mouth" at Stadskanaal. The village temporarily grew, and was home to 636 people in 1916, however the growth started to stagnate and it turned into an agricultural community.

In 1918, a little wooden church was built. It was replaced by a stone building in 1951. It was decommissioned in 1998, and has become a residential home. Between 1924 and 1935, there was a railway station on the Stadskanaal to Ter Apel Border railway line. The building was demolished in 1965.
