= Exloërveen =

- Hamlet
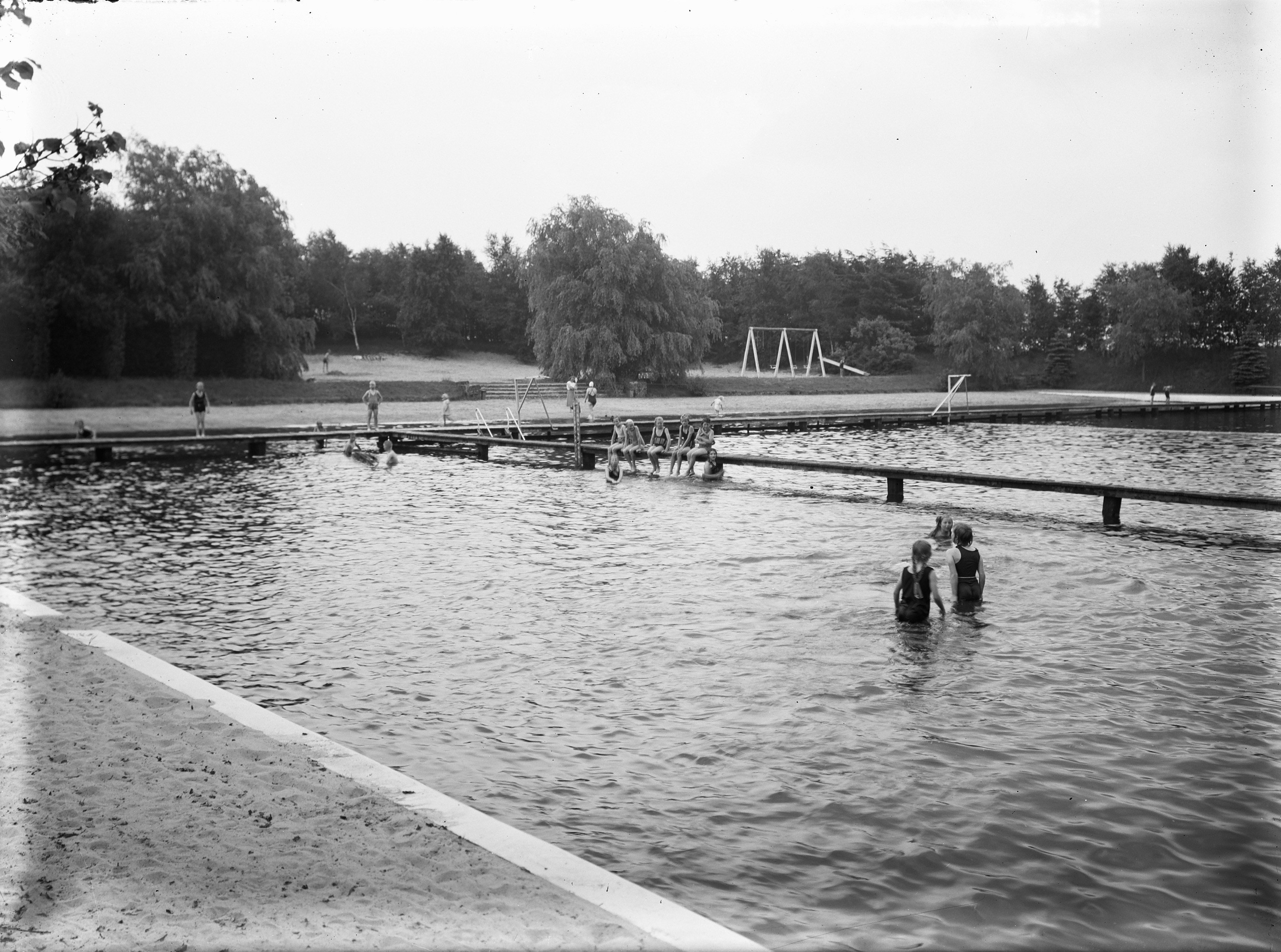
- Swimming pool in Exloërveen

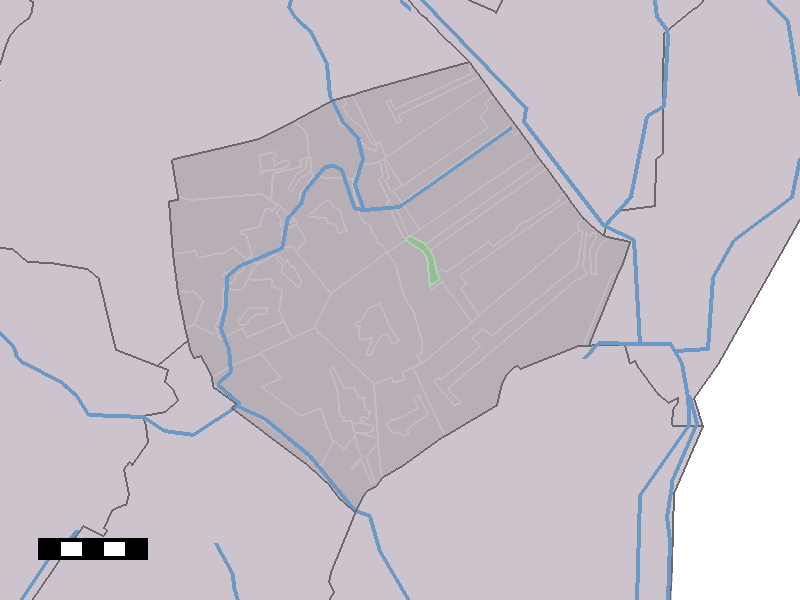
- Exloërveen in the municipality of Borger-Odoorn.

- Location of the village in the province of Drenthe Exloërveen (Netherlands)
- Coordinates: 52°54′N 6°54′E
- Country: Netherlands
- Province: Drenthe
- Municipality: Borger-Odoorn

Area
  - Total: 8.23 km^{2} (3.18 sq mi)
- Elevation: 9 m (30 ft)

Population (2021)
  - Total: 100
  - Density: 12/km^{2} (31/sq mi)
- Time zone: UTC+1 (CET)
  - Summer (DST): UTC+2 (CEST)
- Postal code: 9574
- Dialing code: 0599

Exloërveen is a hamlet in the Dutch province of Drenthe. It is a part of the municipality of Borger-Odoorn, and lies about 15 km north of Emmen.

The hamlet was first mentioned in 1899 as Exloërveen, and means "peat excavation settlement belonging to Exloo". The excavation started in the 17th century. Exloërveen is considered outside of the build up area, however it does have place name signs.
