= Zandberg, Groningen-Drenthe =

Zandberg
- Village
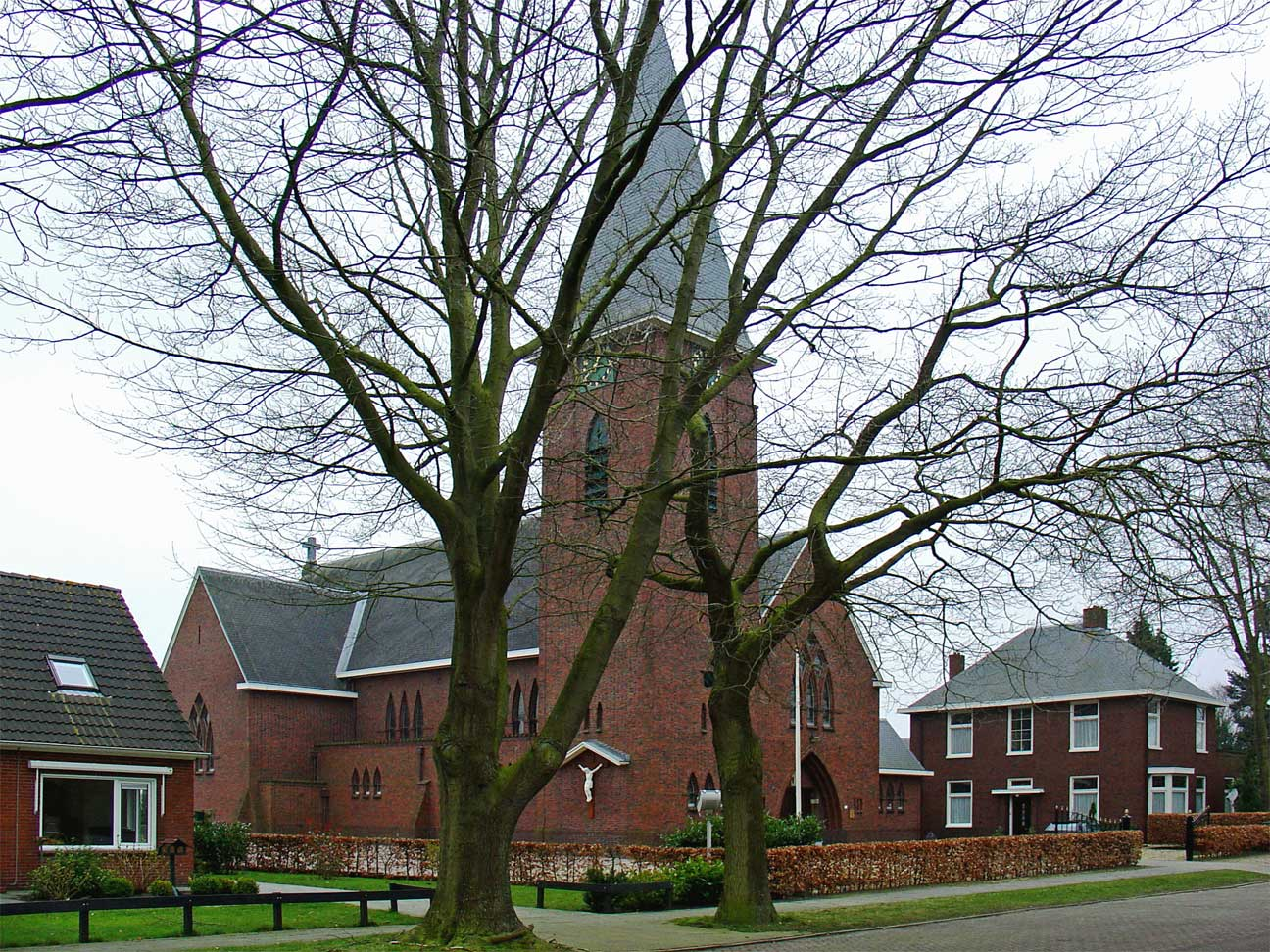
- Church of St. Joseph

- Location within Groningen (province) Location within Netherlands
- Coordinates: 52°55′09″N 7°01′33″E
- Country: Netherlands
- Province(s): Groningen; Drenthe
- Municipalities: Westerwolde; Borger-Odoorn

Area
  - Total: 0.90 km^{2} (0.35 sq mi)
- Elevation: 10 m (33 ft)

Population (2021)
  - Total: 55
  - Density: 61/km^{2} (160/sq mi)
- Time zone: UTC+1 (CET)
  - Summer (DST): UTC+2 (CEST)
- Postal code: 9564
- Dialing code: 0599

Zandberg is a village in the north of the Netherlands, partly located in the Groningen municipality of Westerwolde and partly in the Drenthe municipality of Borger-Odoorn. The village was created in the early nineteenth century as a settlement in the peat colonies. The first residents came from the neighboring part of Germany. Zandberg is therefore one of the Catholic enclaves in the Northern Netherlands.

Zandberg owes its name to the sand head, also known as the Schaapsberg, in the green grounds along the stream that was called upstream from Zandberg Valtherdiep and downstream Mussel-Aa. This hill was used to feed sheep and there were possibly huts for the herdsmen of cattle. It was on the border between the Marks Onstwedde and Valthe and was disputed by both. The Semslinie decided this dispute in favor of Valthe.

The village gained some fame in 2002 when the Giro d'Italia passed through the village, where an intermediate sprint was held. In 2004 the bond with Italy was strengthened once again when pastor Jaring de Wolff dedicated a memorial mass to Italian cyclist Marco Pantani who died in that year. Officially, the cyclists did not drive through the town of Zandberg in 2002, but through the Zandberg street, located in Ter Apelkanaal, the village next door. A mistake was made at the time and, the name Ter Apelkanaal was replaced by Zandberg during the Giro.

Zandberg had a stopping point between 1924 and 1935 that lay on the Stadskanaal to Ter Apel railway line. The track has since been demolished, but the station remains intact.

According to information from the municipality of Borger-Odoorn, the province of Zandberg in Drenthe counted 52 inhabitants on 1 January 2007 (24 men and 28 women). No precise details are available for the Groningen part.
