= Borger-Odoorn =

- Municipality
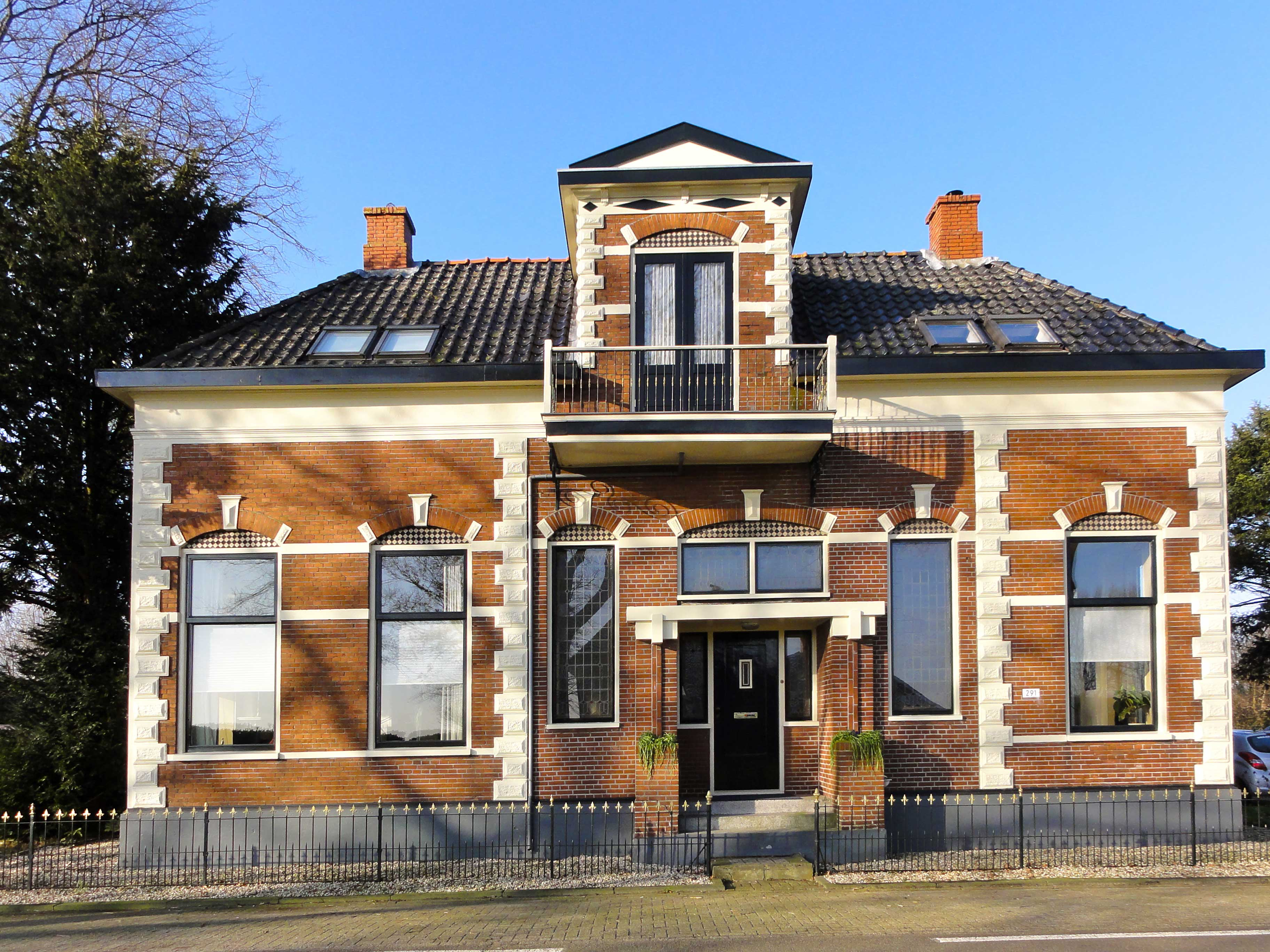
- Monumental home in Tweede Exloërmond

- Flag Coat of arms

- Location in Drenthe
- Coordinates: 52°53′N 6°52′E
- Country: Netherlands
- Province: Drenthe
- Established: 1 January 1998

Government
  - Body: Municipal council
  - Mayor: Jan Seton (CDA)

Area
  - Total: 277.89 km^{2} (107.29 sq mi)
  - Land: 274.53 km^{2} (106.00 sq mi)
  - Water: 3.36 km^{2} (1.30 sq mi)
- Elevation: 23 m (75 ft)

Population (January 2021)
  - Total: 25,598
  - Density: 93/km^{2} (240/sq mi)
- Time zone: UTC+1 (CET)
  - Summer (DST): UTC+2 (CEST)
- Postcode: Parts of 7800 and 9500 range
- Area code: 0591, 0599
- Website: www.borger-odoorn.nl

Borger-Odoorn (Dutch pronunciation: [ˌbɔrɣər oːˈdoːr(ə)n]) is a municipality in the northeastern Netherlands in the province of Drenthe.

The local Hunebedcentrum Borger features several megaliths (or 'hunebeds') associated with the Neolithic and mesolithic Funnelbeaker culture, as well as re-creations of historical houses.

== Population centers ==
- Borger
- Bronneger
- Bronnegerveen
- Buinen
- Buinerveen
- Drouwen
- Drouwenermond
- Drouwenerveen
- Eerste Exloërmond
- Ees
- Eesergroen
- Eeserveen
- Ellertshaar
- Exloërveen
- Exloo
- Klijndijk
- Nieuw-Buinen
- Odoorn
- Odoornerveen
- Tweede Exloërmond
- Tweede Valthermond
- Valthe
- Valthermond
- Westdorp
- Zandberg

=== Topography ===
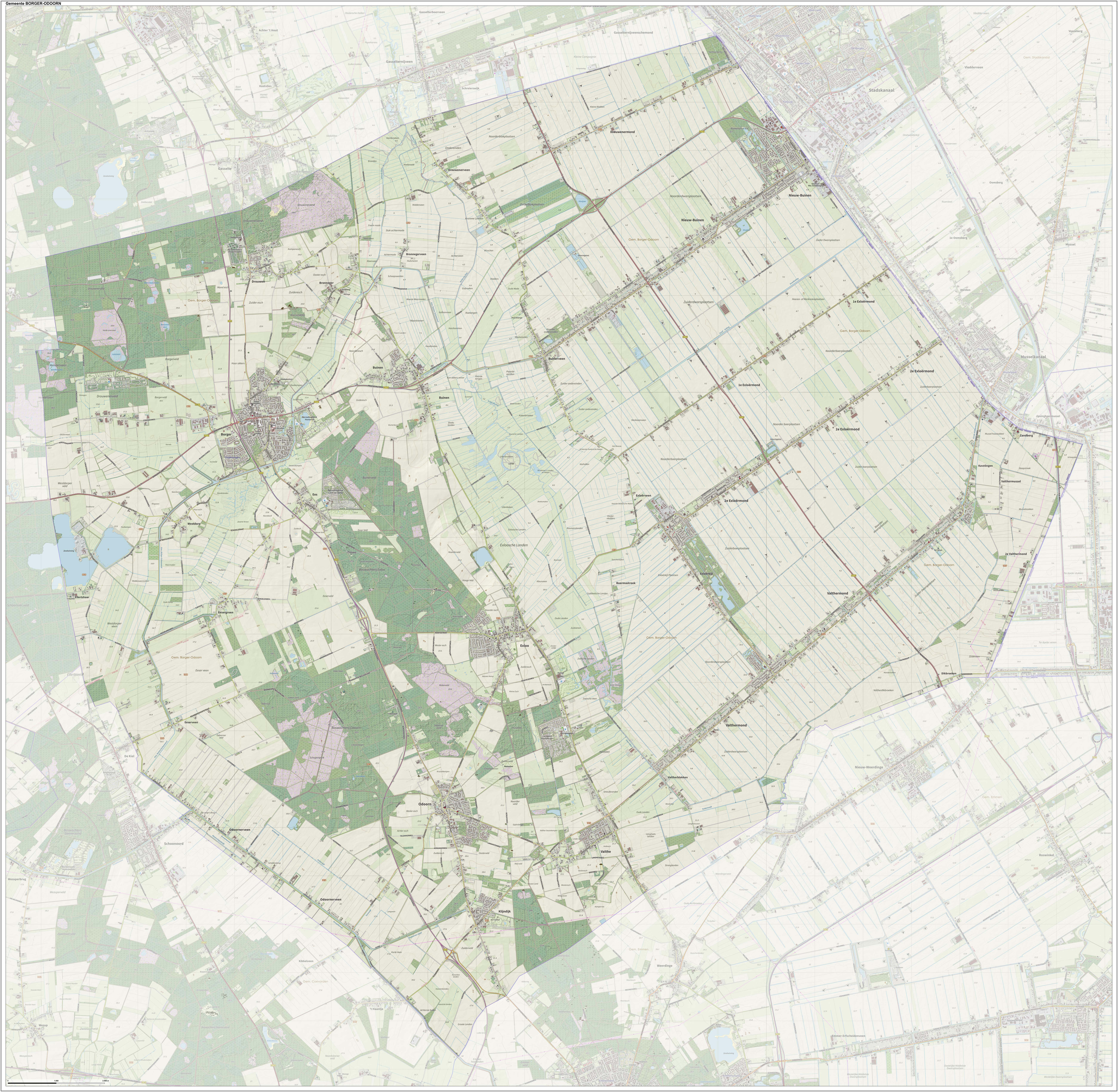

Dutch Topographic map of the municipality of Borger-Odoorn, June 2015.

== Notable people ==
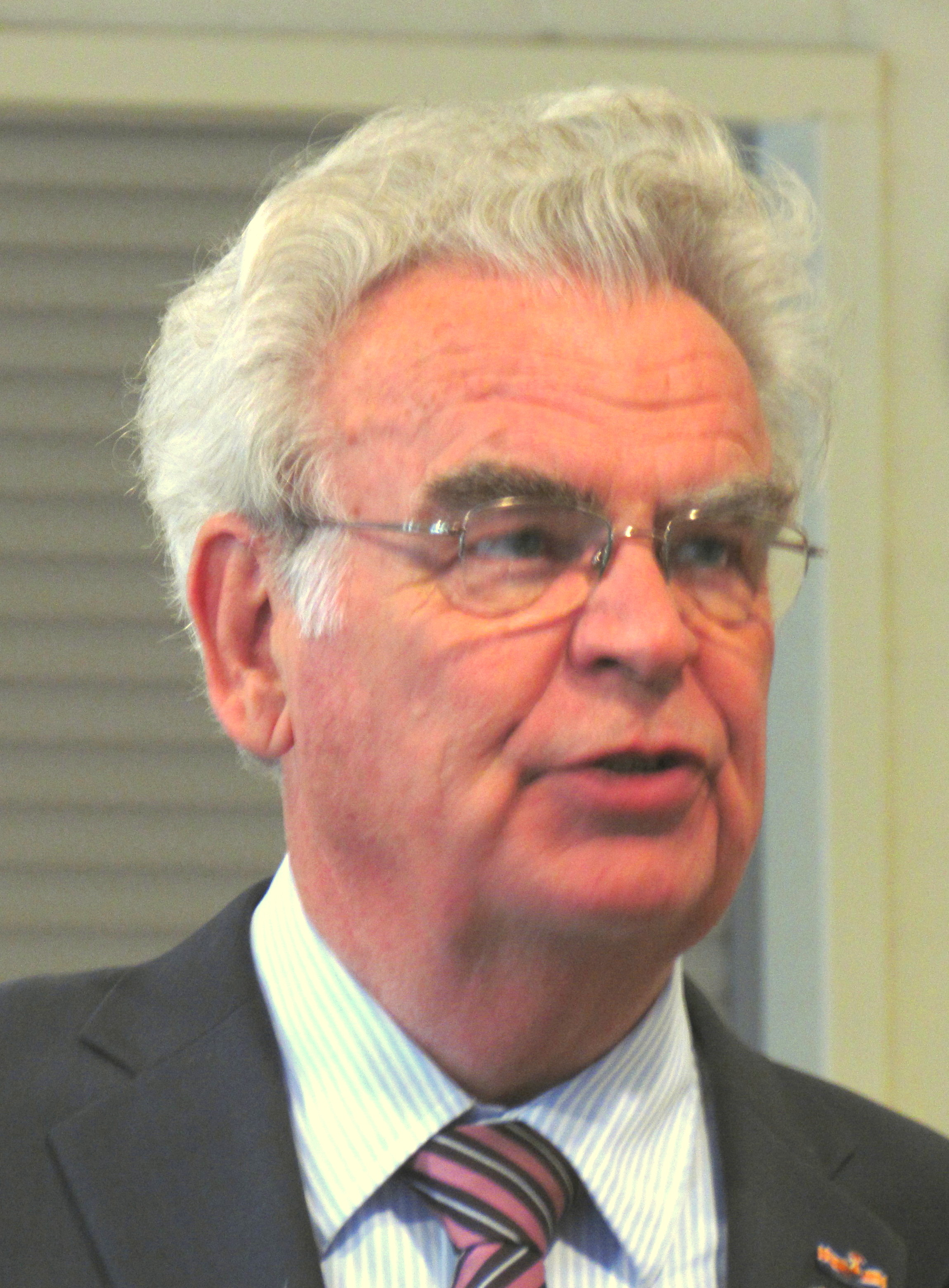
Egbert Schuurman, 2011

- Albert Meems (1888 in Nieuw-Buinen – after 1957) a Dutch spy for Germany in the Second World War
- Pieter van Boven (1898 – 1952) a Dutch fencer, competed at the 1924 Summer Olympics
- Egbert Schuurman (born 1937 in Borger) a Dutch engineer, philosopher and politician
- Henk Nienhuis (1941 in Nieuw-Buinen – 2017) a Dutch footballer and manager.
- Henk G. Sol (born 1951 in Borger) a Dutch organizational theorist and academic
- Carsten de Dreu (born 1966 in Borger) Professor of Psychology at Leiden University and Behavioral Economics at the University of Amsterdam

== Gallery ==
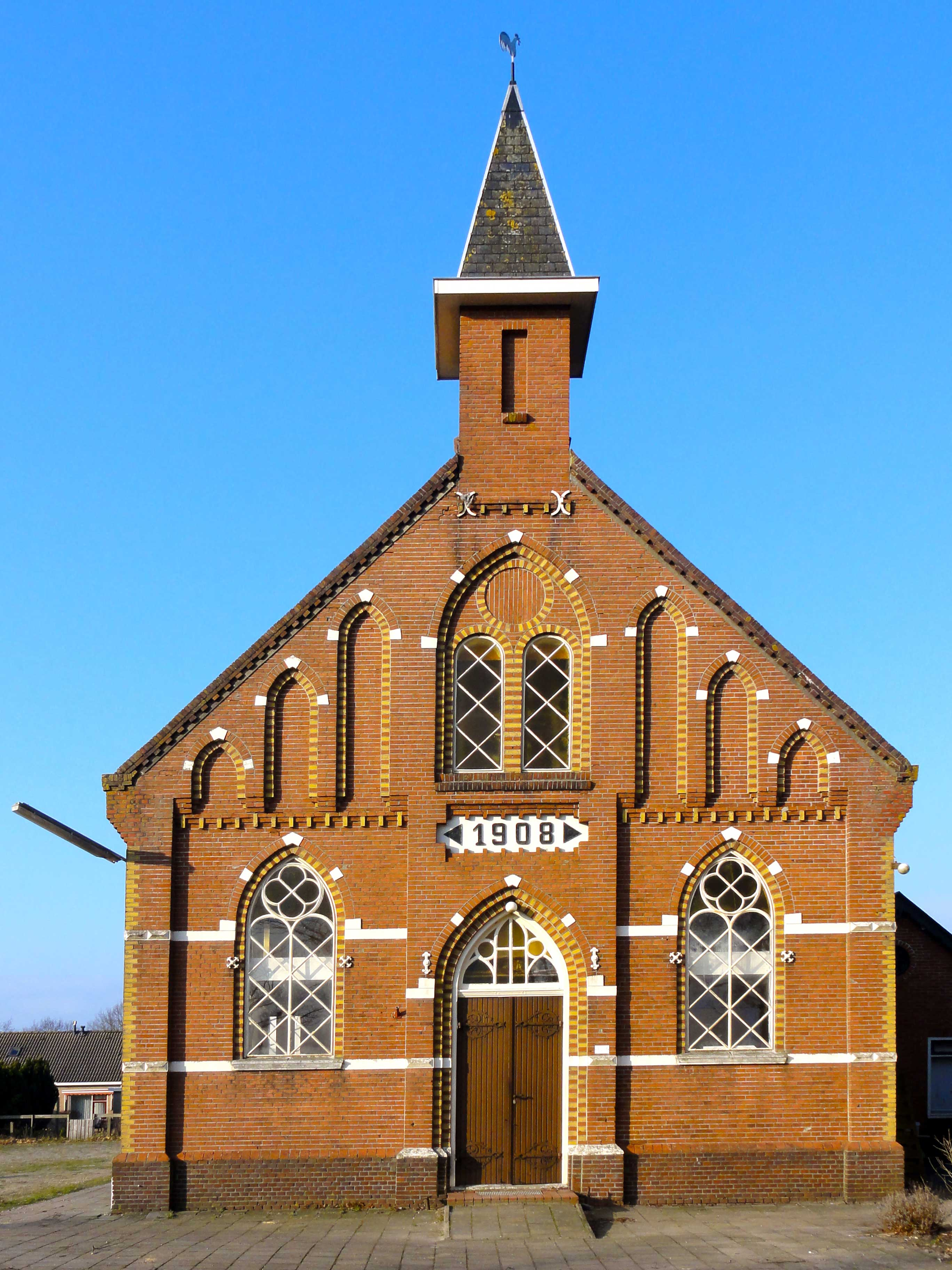
Zuiderdiep123 gereformeerde kerk Tweede Exloermond

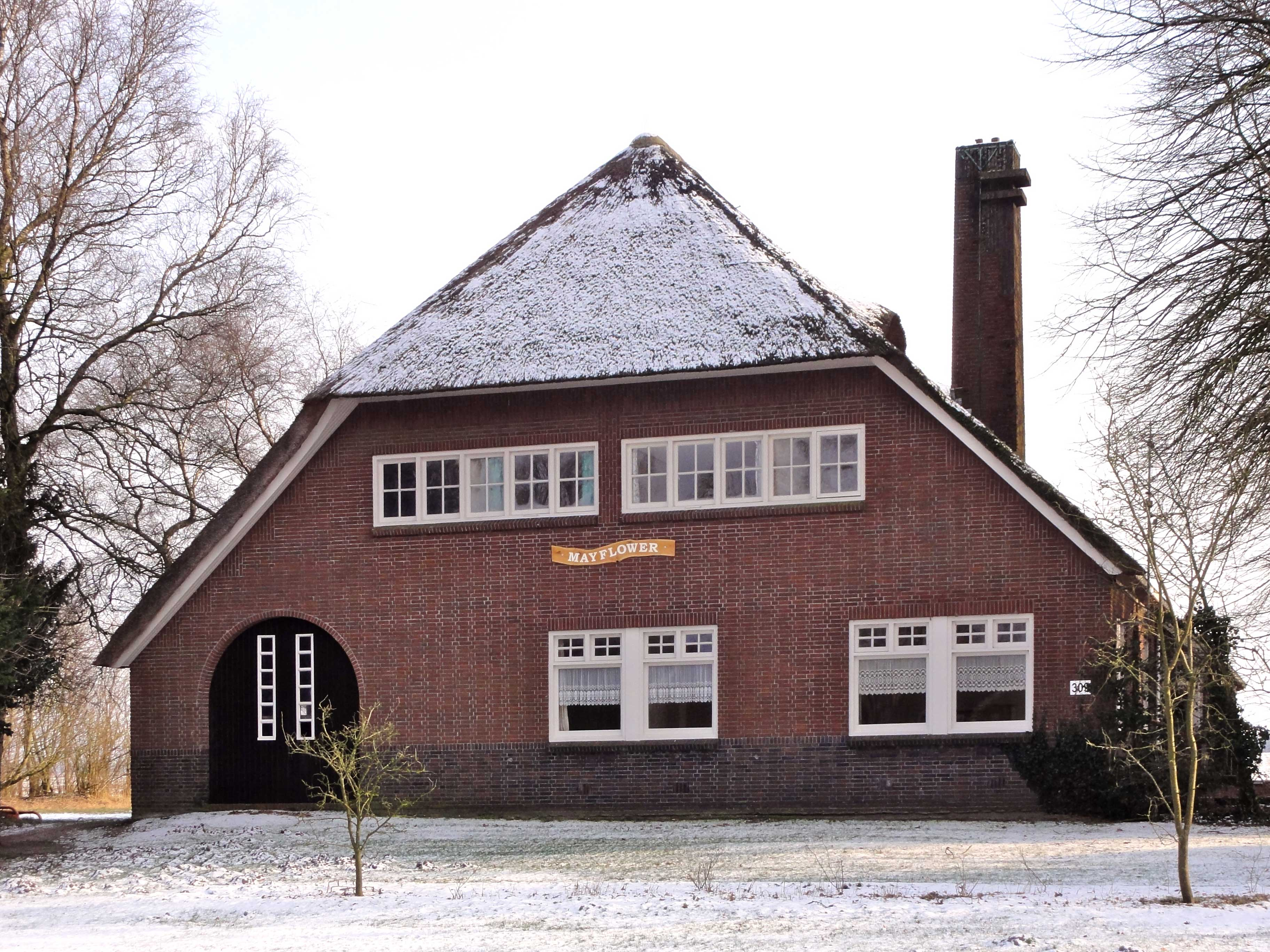
Boerderij Zuiderdiep309 Valthermond

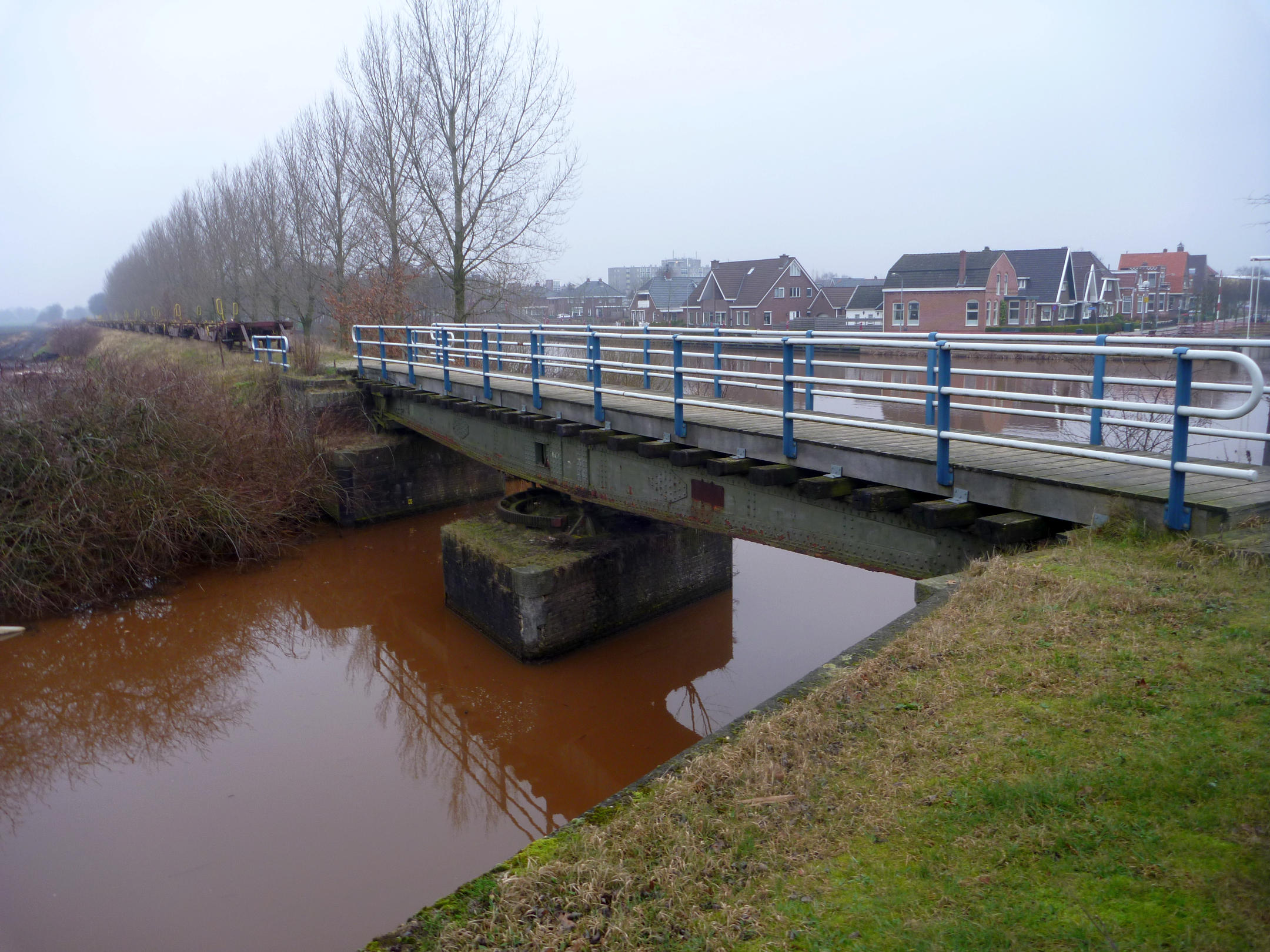
Valthermond spoor

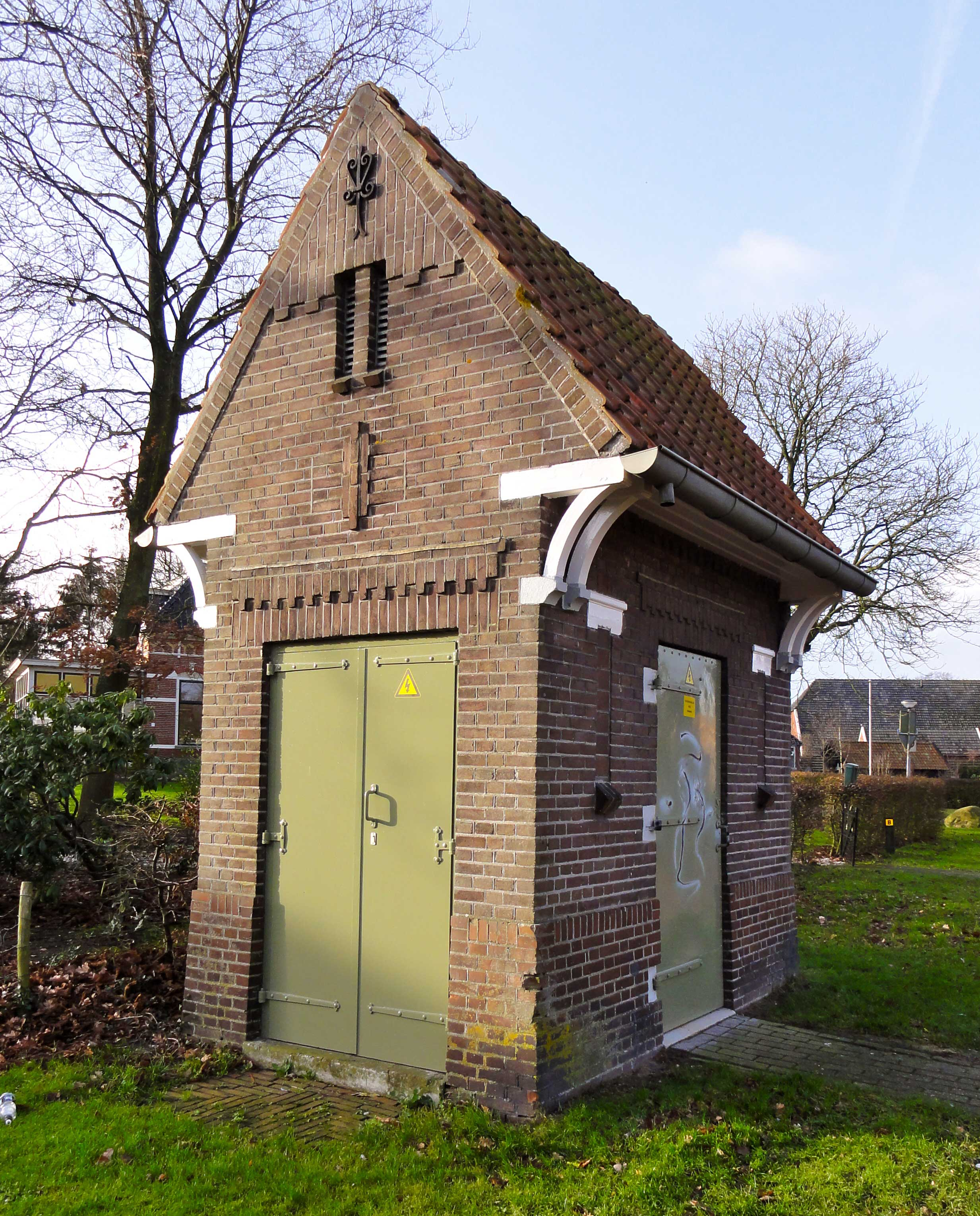
Trafohuisje Hoofdstraat Buinen

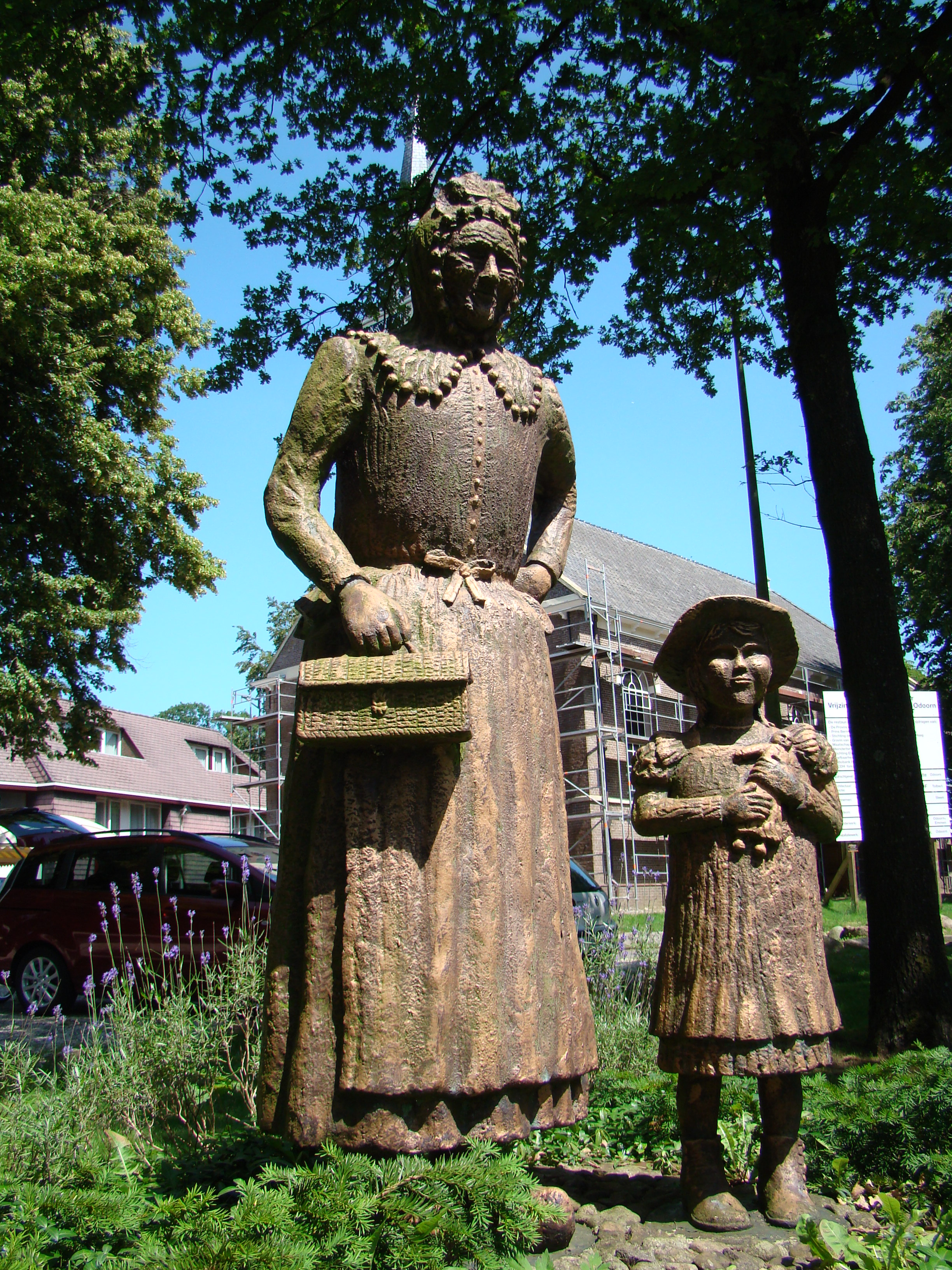
Odoorn

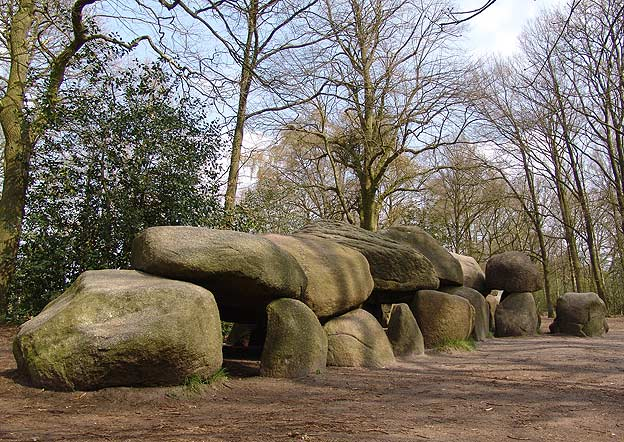
Megalith at Hunebedcentrum Borger

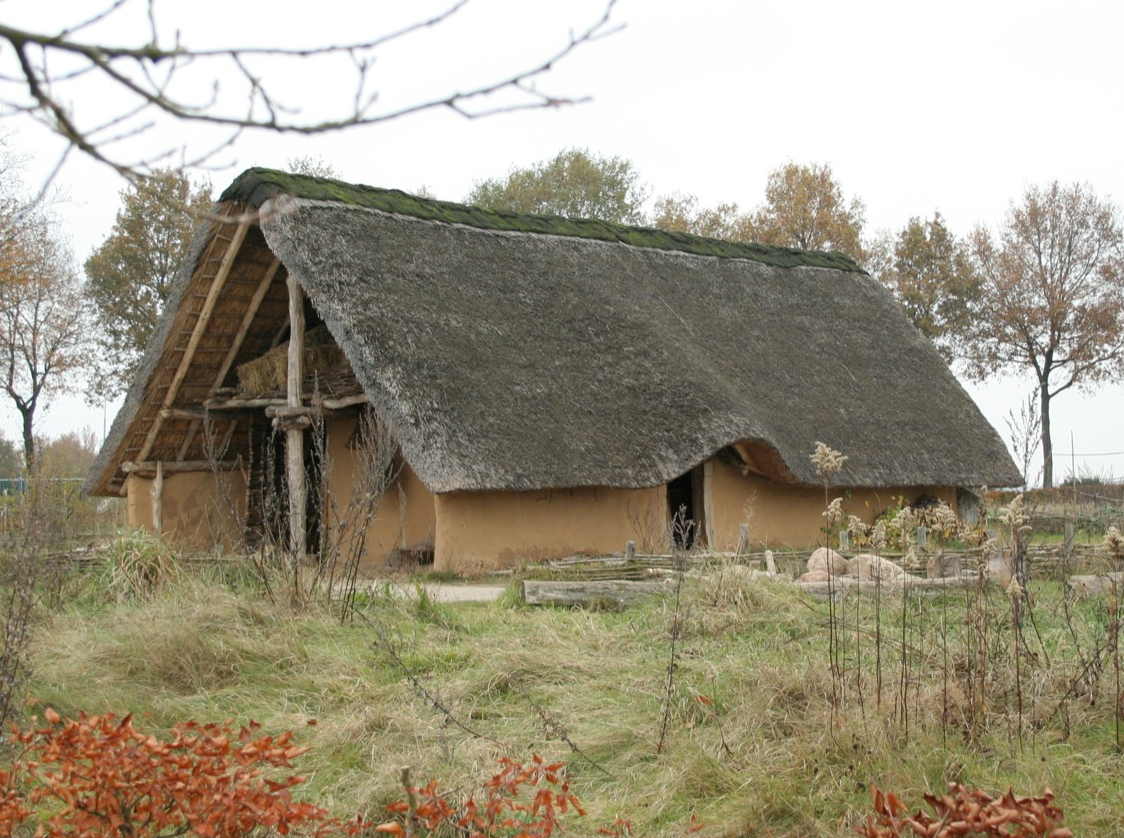
Reconstruction of a Funnelbeaker house
