= 2e Exloërmond =

2e Exloërmond Tweede Exloërmond
- Village
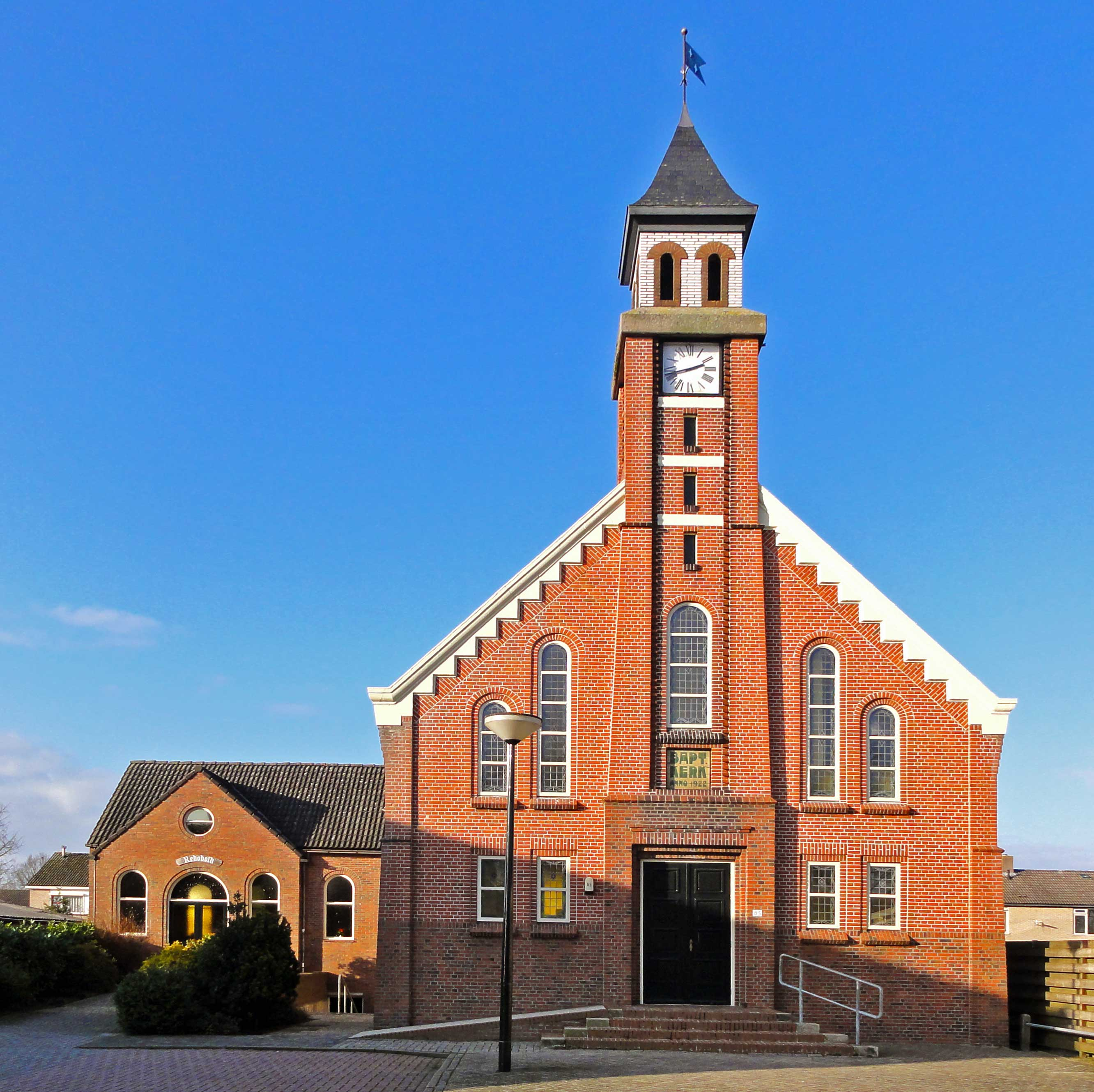
- Baptist Church in 2012

- Location in the province of Drenthe in the Netherlands
- Coordinates: 52.9070°N 6.9294°E
- Country: Netherlands
- Province: Drenthe
- Municipality: Borger-Odoorn
- Established: 1853

Area
  - Total: 21.70 km^{2} (8.38 sq mi)
- Elevation: 10 m (33 ft)

Population (2021)
  - Total: 2,285
  - Density: 105.3/km^{2} (272.7/sq mi)
- Time zone: UTC+1 (CET)
  - Summer (DST): UTC+2 (CEST)
- Postal code: 9571
- Dialing code: 0599

2e Exloërmond (Dutch pronunciation: [ˈtʋeːdə ˈʔɛksloːərˌmɔnt]; before 2008: Tweede Exloërmond) is a village in the Dutch province of Drenthe. It is a part of the municipality of Borger-Odoorn, and lies about 15 km north of Emmen.

== History ==
The village was first mentioned between 1851 and 1855 "Zuider Hoofddiep of Exlooder Mond", and means "second (canal) that has his mouth (at the main canal) belonging to Exloo". It refers to a peat colony which is located at the eponymous canal which was dug in 1829. 2e (second) has been added to distinguish between 1e Exloërmond.

2e Exloërmond is a long linear canal village which developed when the canal was dug from Musselkanaal around 1840. The first houses were built in 1853. The hamlet of Eexloërkijl developed on the western end, however both settlement later merged into a single settlement. The peat concession measured 3,100 hectares (7,700 acres) and the peat layer was about 3 metres (9.8 ft) thick. In 2008, the name was officially changed to 2e Exloërmond.

Up to 1903, transport was limited to waterways only. In 1903, the road to Exloo was constructed. The Baptist church was built in 1922 and contains some Art Deco influences. It is one of the few Baptist churches in the Netherlands other than the Mennonite churches. The local pub was built in 1907 and has an entrance in the corner.

On 3 July 1941, Bolesław Feliks Stachoń of the Free Polish Air Force took off in his Vickers Wellington for a mission to Bremen. The plane was shot down over 2e Exloërmond by Helmut Lent. Stachoń died and the other five crew members were taken prisoner of war. Stachoń was buried at the local cemetery where a special stone was placed on his grave. In 1963, his grave was moved to the Polish Military Field of Honour in Breda. His stone was later rediscovered in storage, and a little monument has been erected on the local cemetery in 2017.

== Gallery ==
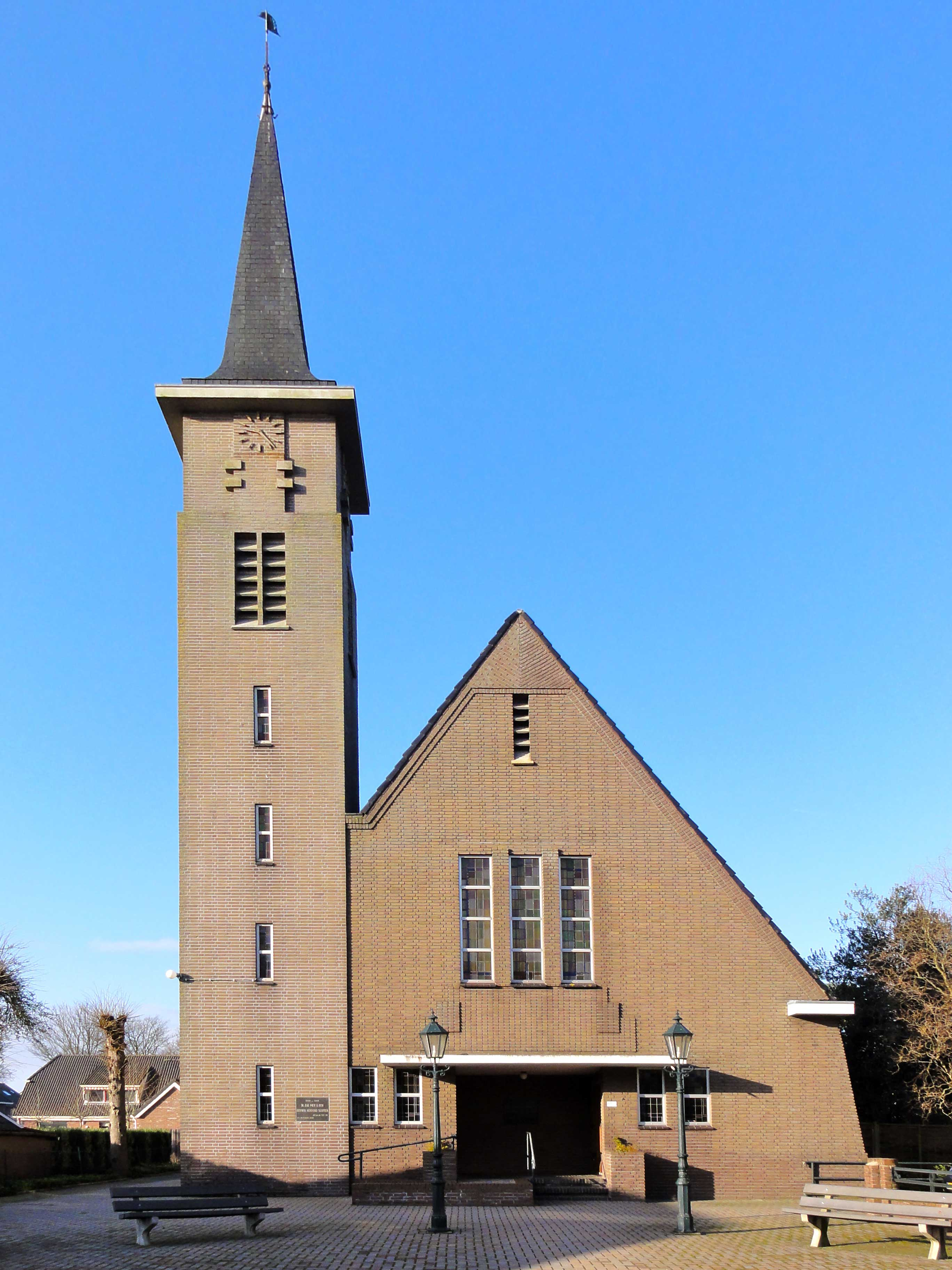
Dutch Reformed church

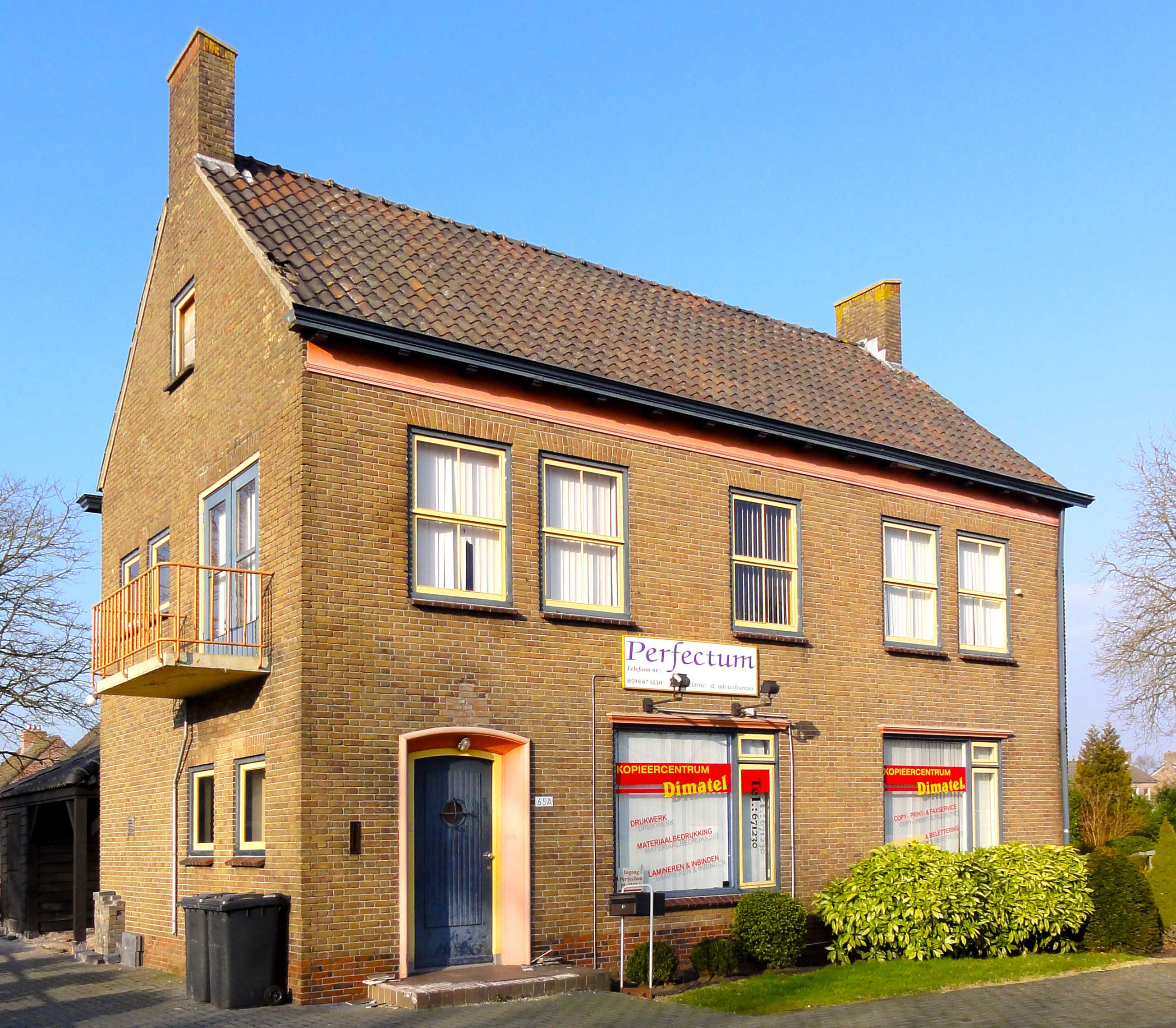
Copy shop

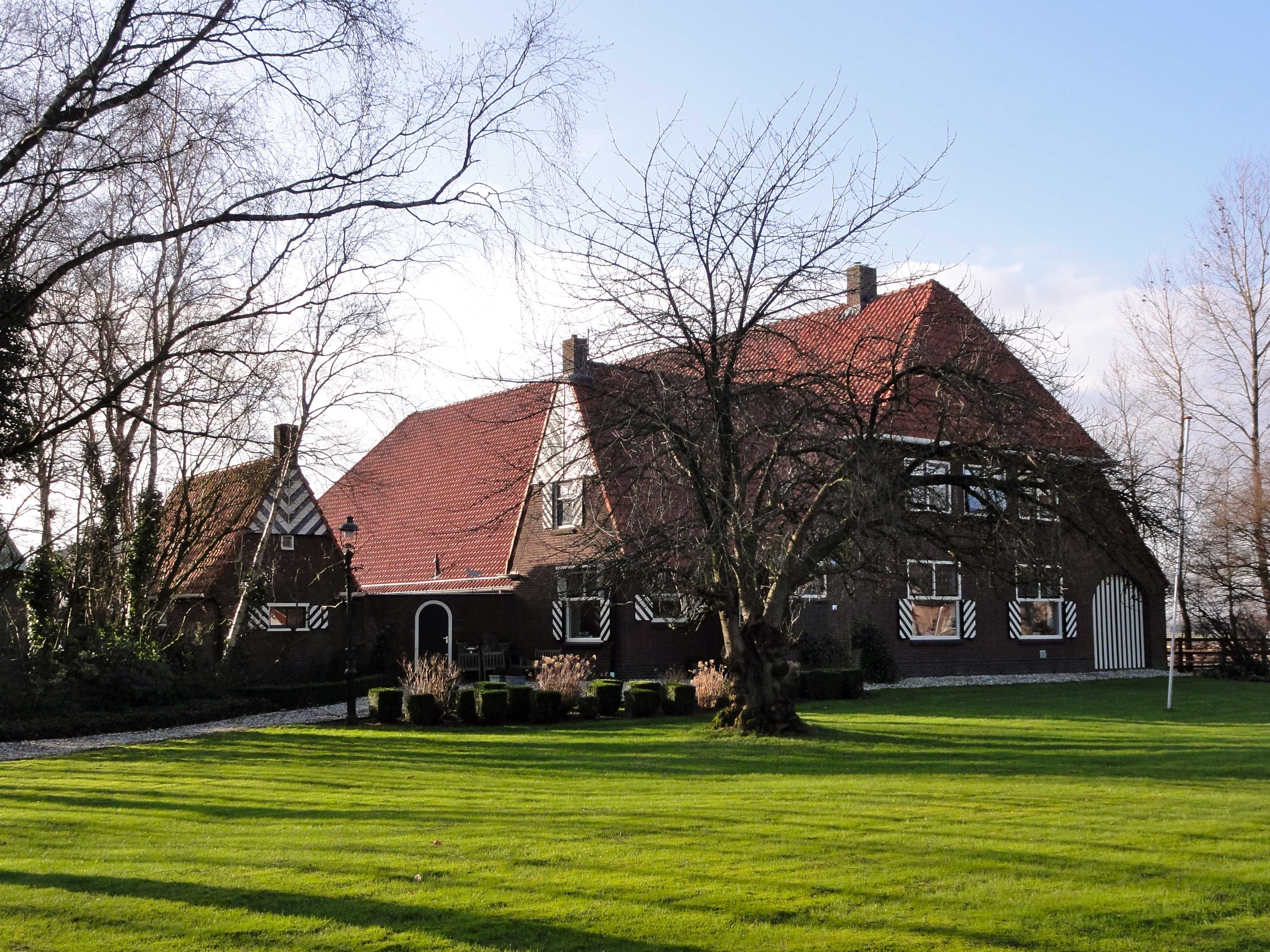
Farm in 2e Exloërmond

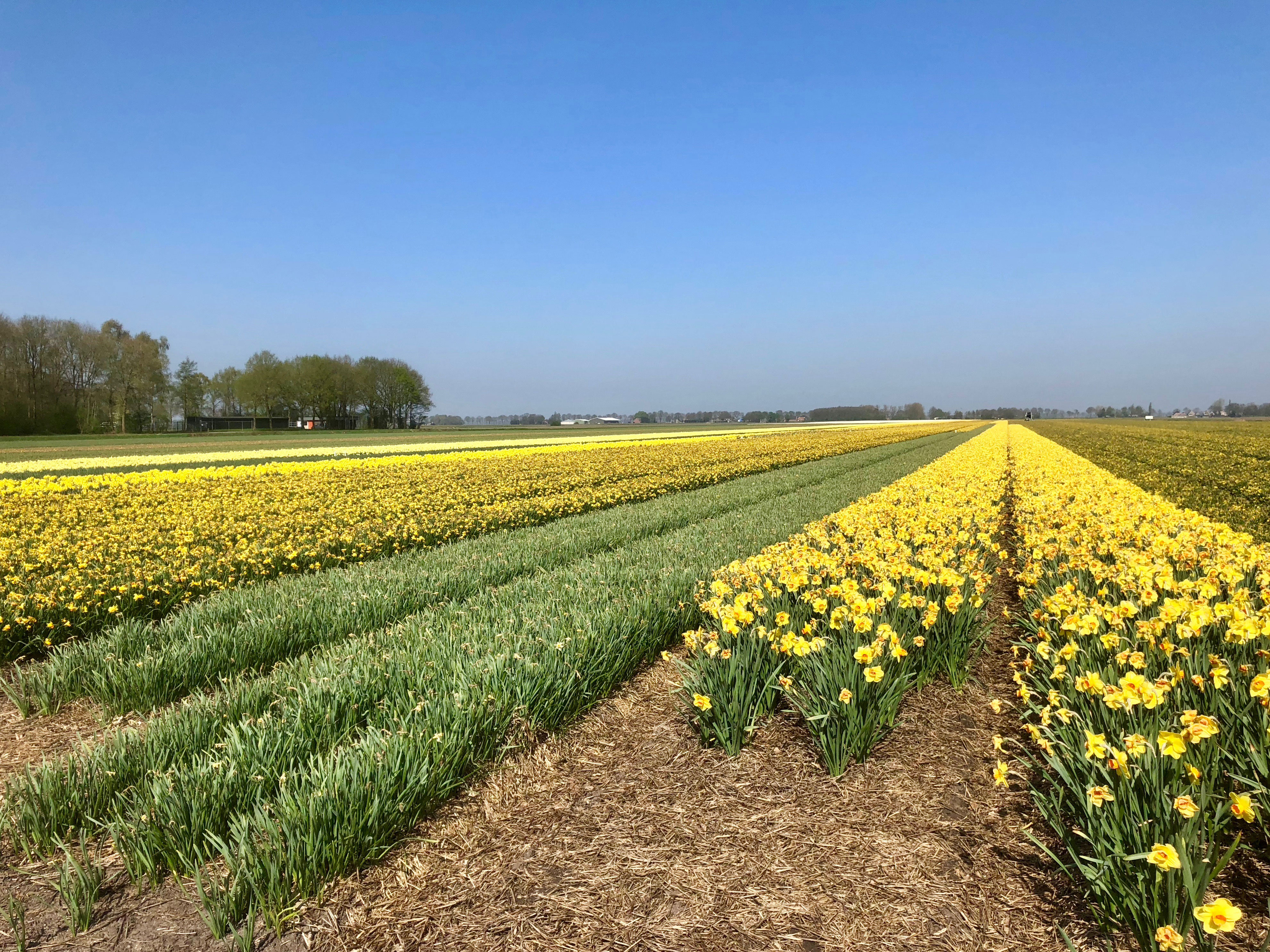
Field of flowers in 2e Exloërmond
