= Odoornerveen =

- Village
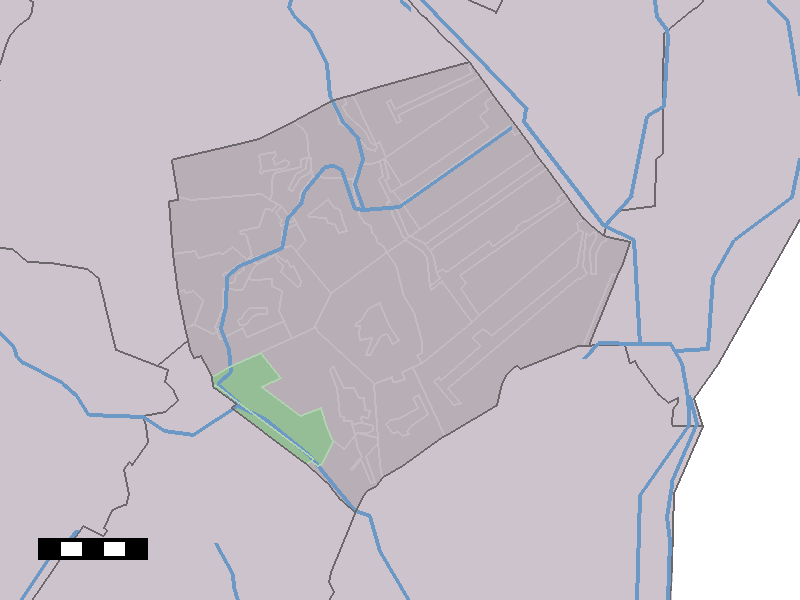
- Odoornerveen in the municipality of Borger-Odoorn.

- Location in the province of Drenthe in the Netherlands Odoornerveen (Netherlands)
- Coordinates: 52.8374°N 6.7944°E
- Country: Netherlands
- Province: Drenthe
- Municipality: Borger-Odoorn

Area
  - Total: 17.58 km^{2} (6.79 sq mi)
- Elevation: 18 m (59 ft)

Population (2021)
  - Total: 415
  - Density: 23.6/km^{2} (61.1/sq mi)
- Time zone: UTC+1 (CET)
  - Summer (DST): UTC+2 (CEST)
- Postal code: 7874
- Dialing code: 0591

Odoornerveen is a village in the Dutch province of Drenthe. It is a part of the municipality of Borger-Odoorn, and lies about 12 km northwest of Emmen.

The village was first mentioned between 1851 and 1855 as "Odoorner veen", and means "peat colony of Odoorn". In 1854, the Oranjekanaal was dug to excavate the peat in the area and the village developed along the canal. About 1,600 hectares (4,000 acres) of peat was excavated between 1856 and 1880, and the area was gradually cultivated for agriculture. Odoornerveen never had a church. The former pub was converted into a village house in 1984.
