= Klijndijk =

- Village
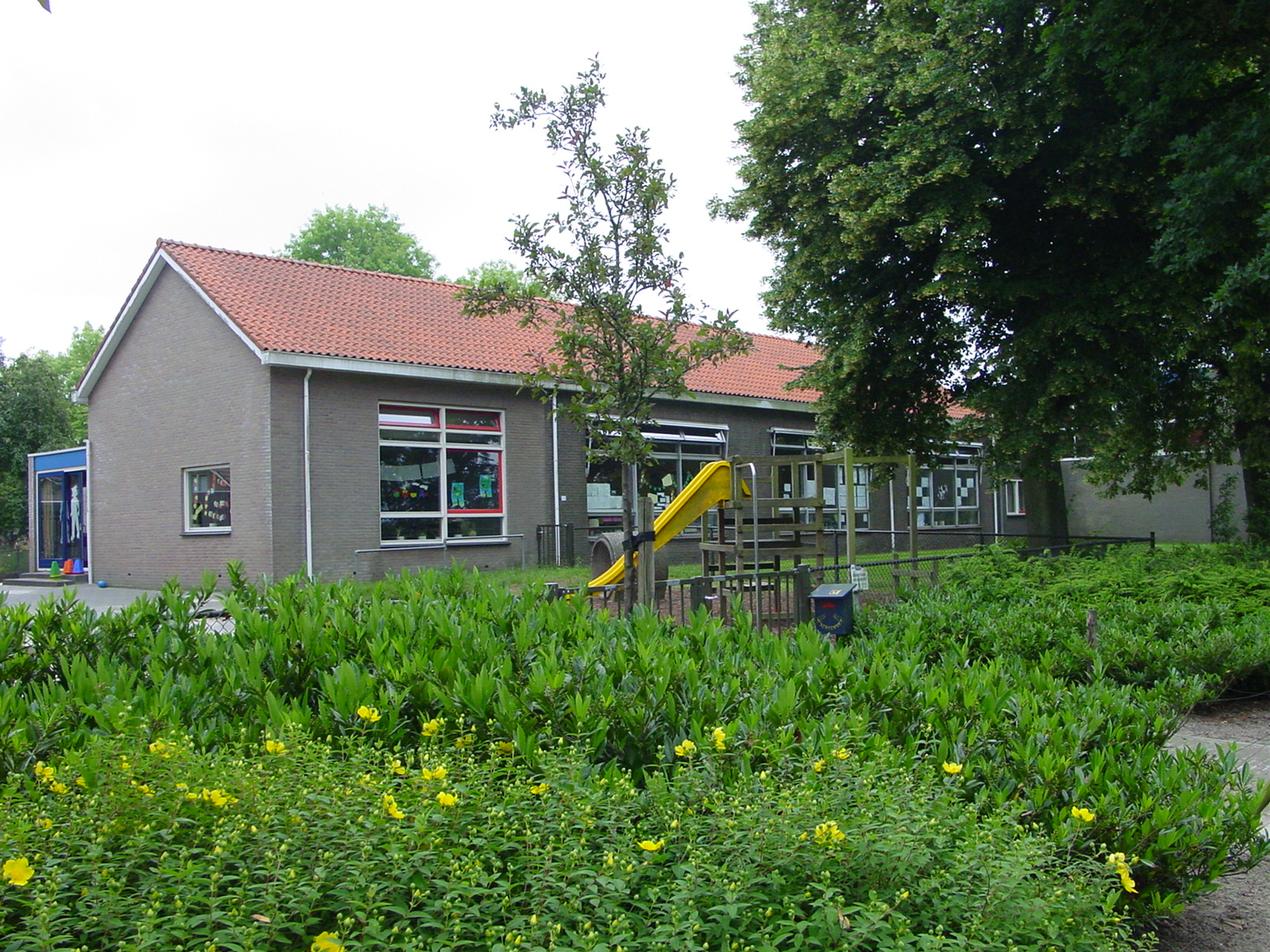
- Former school

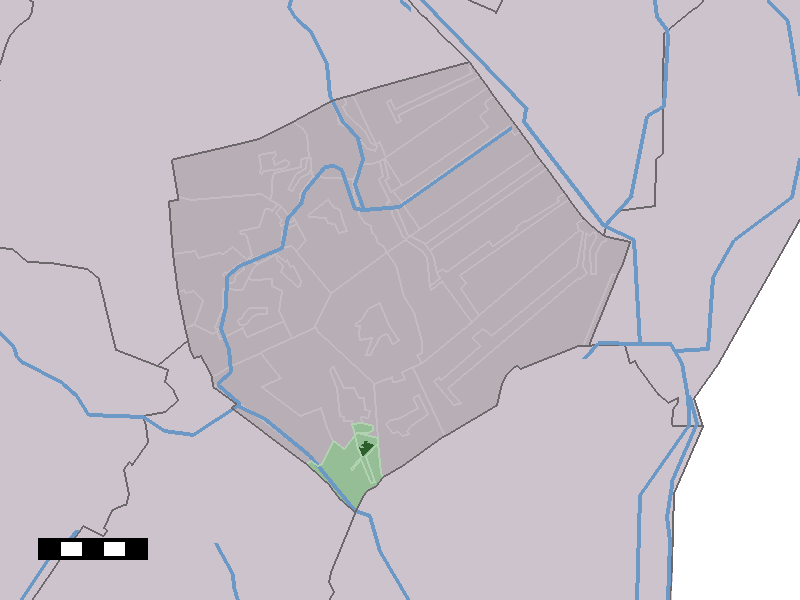
- The village centre (dark green) and the statistical district (light green) of Klijndijk in the municipality of Borger-Odoorn.

- Location of the village in the province of Drenthe Klijndijk (Netherlands)
- Coordinates: 52.8306°N 6.8582°E
- Country: Netherlands
- Province: Drenthe
- Municipality: Borger-Odoorn

Area
  - Total: 4.59 km^{2} (1.77 sq mi)
- Elevation: 20 m (66 ft)

Population (2021)
  - Total: 745
  - Density: 162/km^{2} (420/sq mi)
- Time zone: UTC+1 (CET)
  - Summer (DST): UTC+2 (CEST)
- Postal code: 7871
- Dialing code: 0591

Klijndijk is a village in the Dutch province of Drenthe. It is a part of the municipality of Borger-Odoorn, and lies about 7 km north of Emmen.

The village was first mentioned in 1899 as Klijndijk, and refers to Jasper Klijn, the founder to the peat excavation company. The earliest reference was on 8 March 1864 when the birth of Aaltje Klos of Kleindijk was registered.
