= Buinen =

- Village
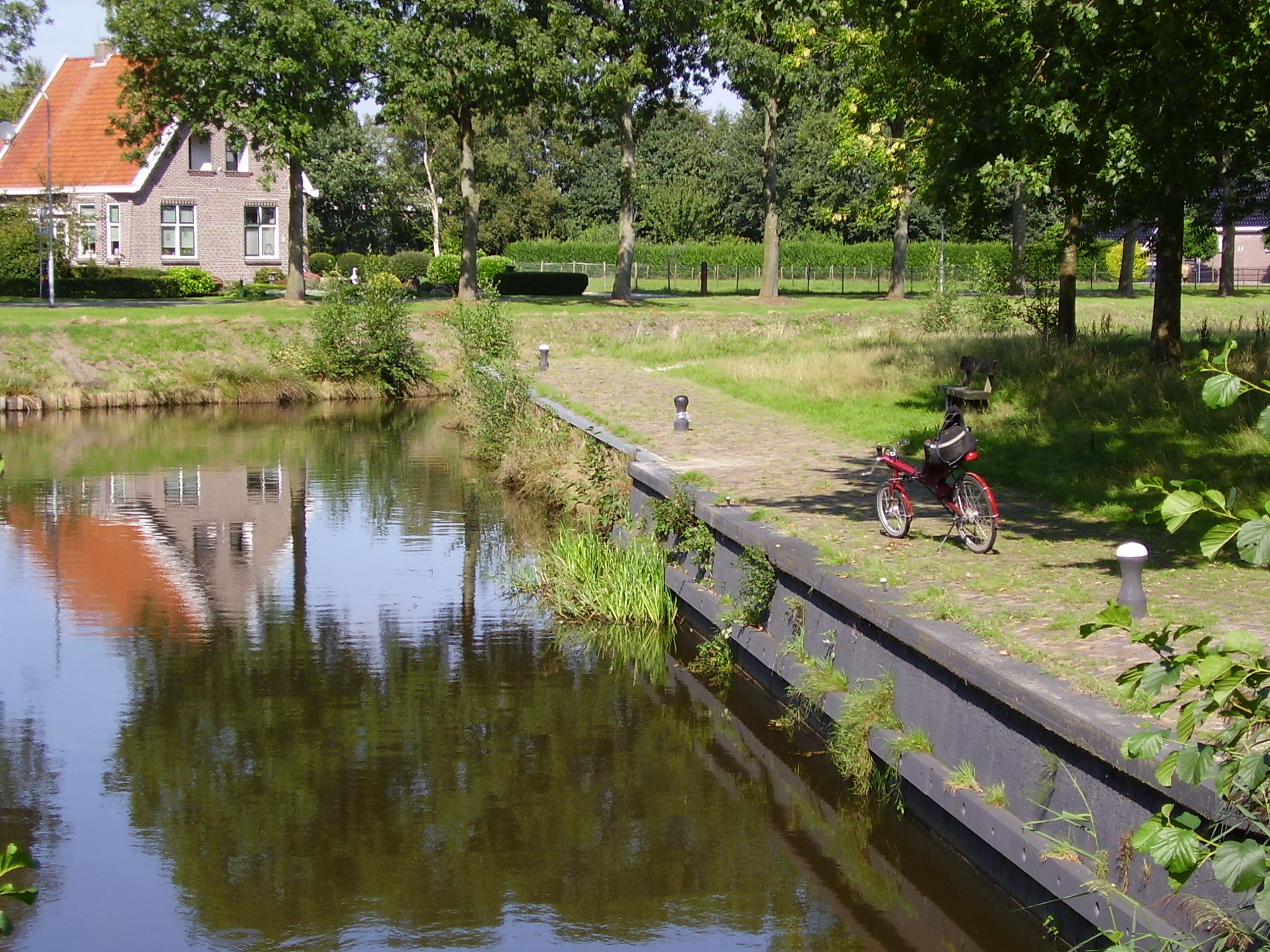

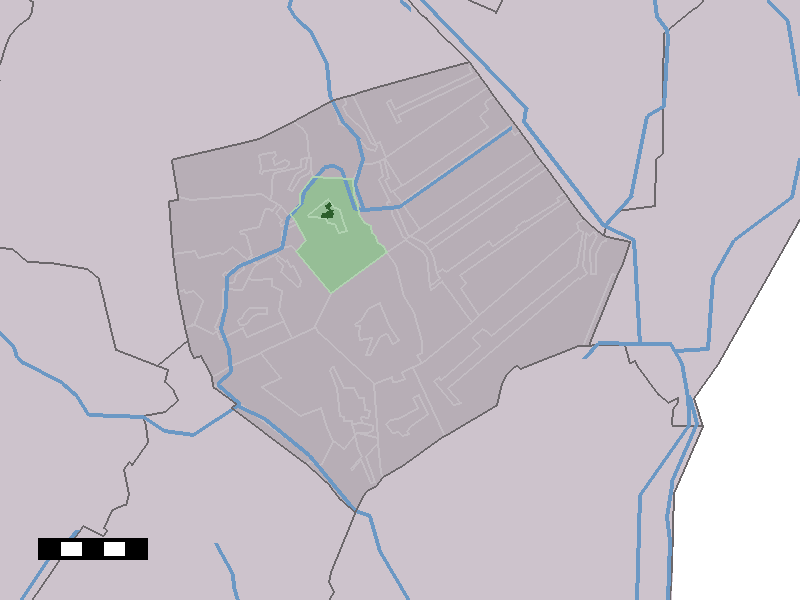
- The village centre (dark green) and the statistical district (light green) of Buinen in the municipality of Borger-Odoorn.

- Location of the village in the province of Drenthe Buinen (Netherlands)
- Coordinates: 52°56′N 6°50′E
- Country: Netherlands
- Province: Drenthe
- Municipality: Borger-Odoorn

Area
  - Total: 14.46 km^{2} (5.58 sq mi)
- Elevation: 17 m (56 ft)

Population (2021)
  - Total: 800
  - Density: 55/km^{2} (140/sq mi)
- Time zone: UTC+1 (CET)
  - Summer (DST): UTC+2 (CEST)
- Postal code: 9528
- Dialing code: 0599

Buinen is a village in the Dutch province of Drenthe. It is a part of the municipality of Borger-Odoorn, and lies about 18 km north of Emmen.

== History ==
The village was first mentioned in 1549 as Bunne. The etymology is unclear. Buinen is an esdorp from the Middle Ages which developed as a satellite of Borger. The elongated village has no church or brink (village square).

Buinen was home to 260 people in 1840. Between 1905 and 1945, there was a railway station in Buinen on the Zwolle to Stadskanaal railway line. The building was demolished in 1961. The railway line and harbour resulted in some growth until about 1940. In 1977, the harbour was filled up.

== Gallery ==
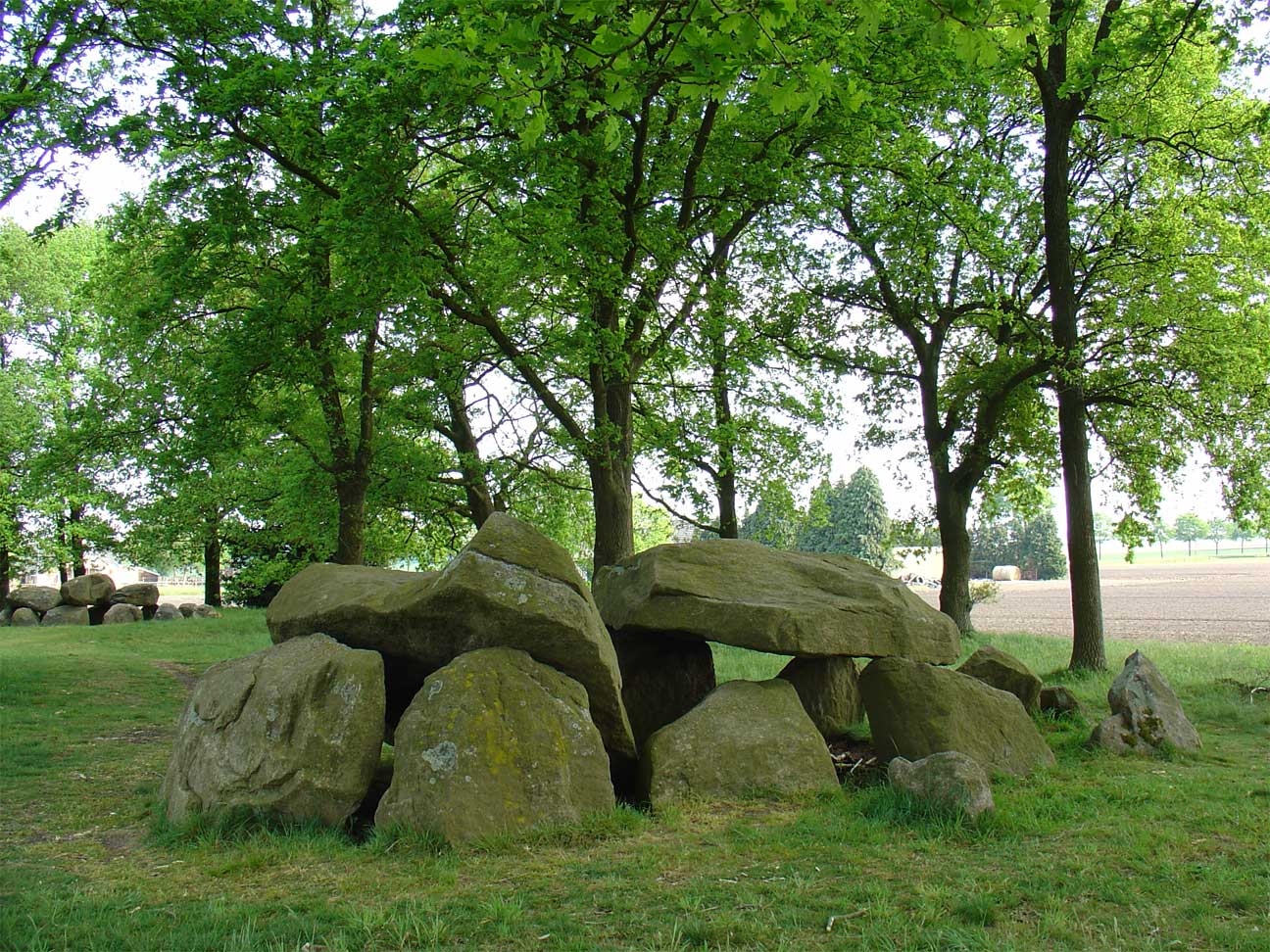
Dolmen D29 with D28 in the background

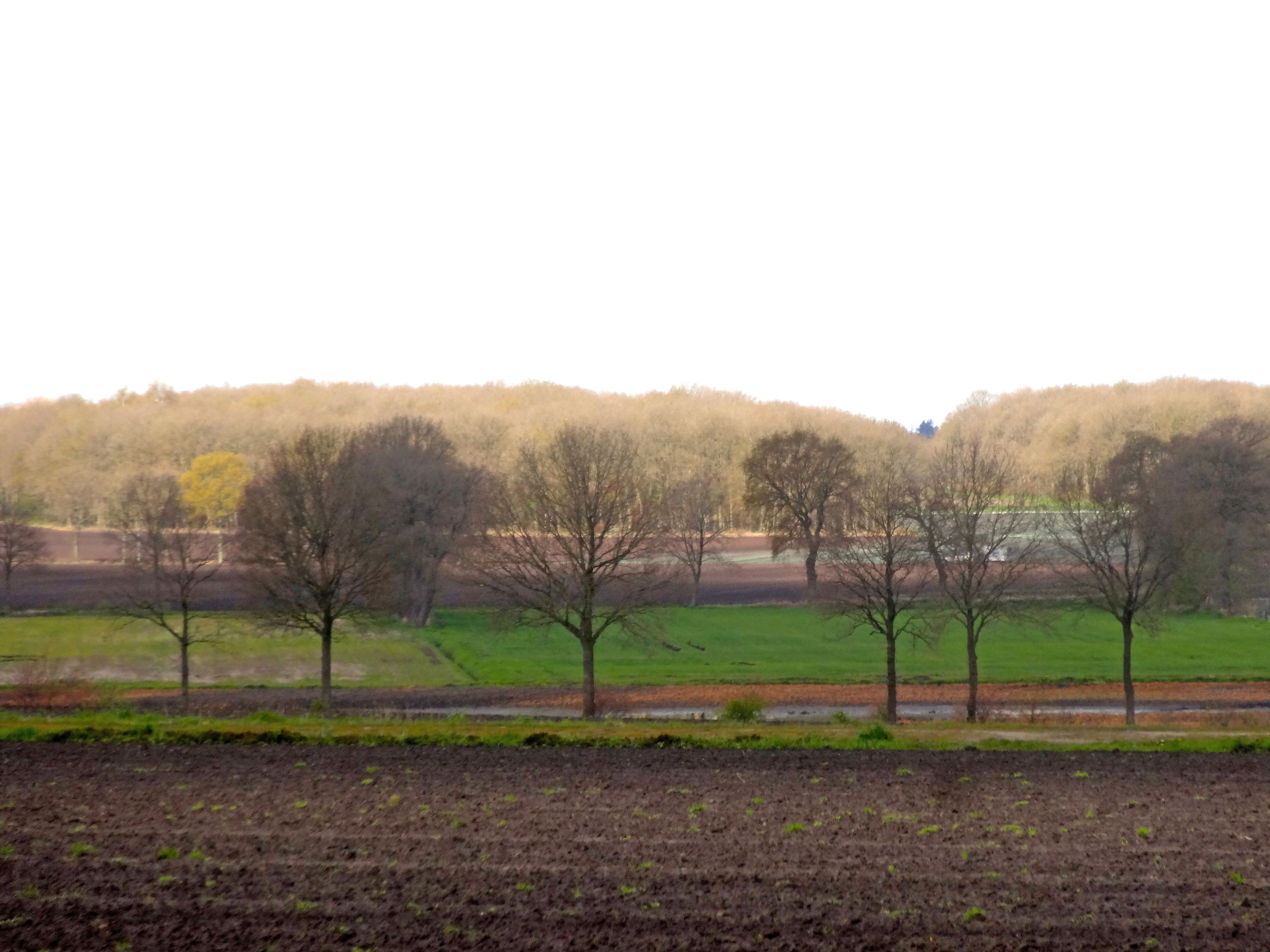
View from the Bunnerbult
