= Ees, Drenthe =

Ees
- Village
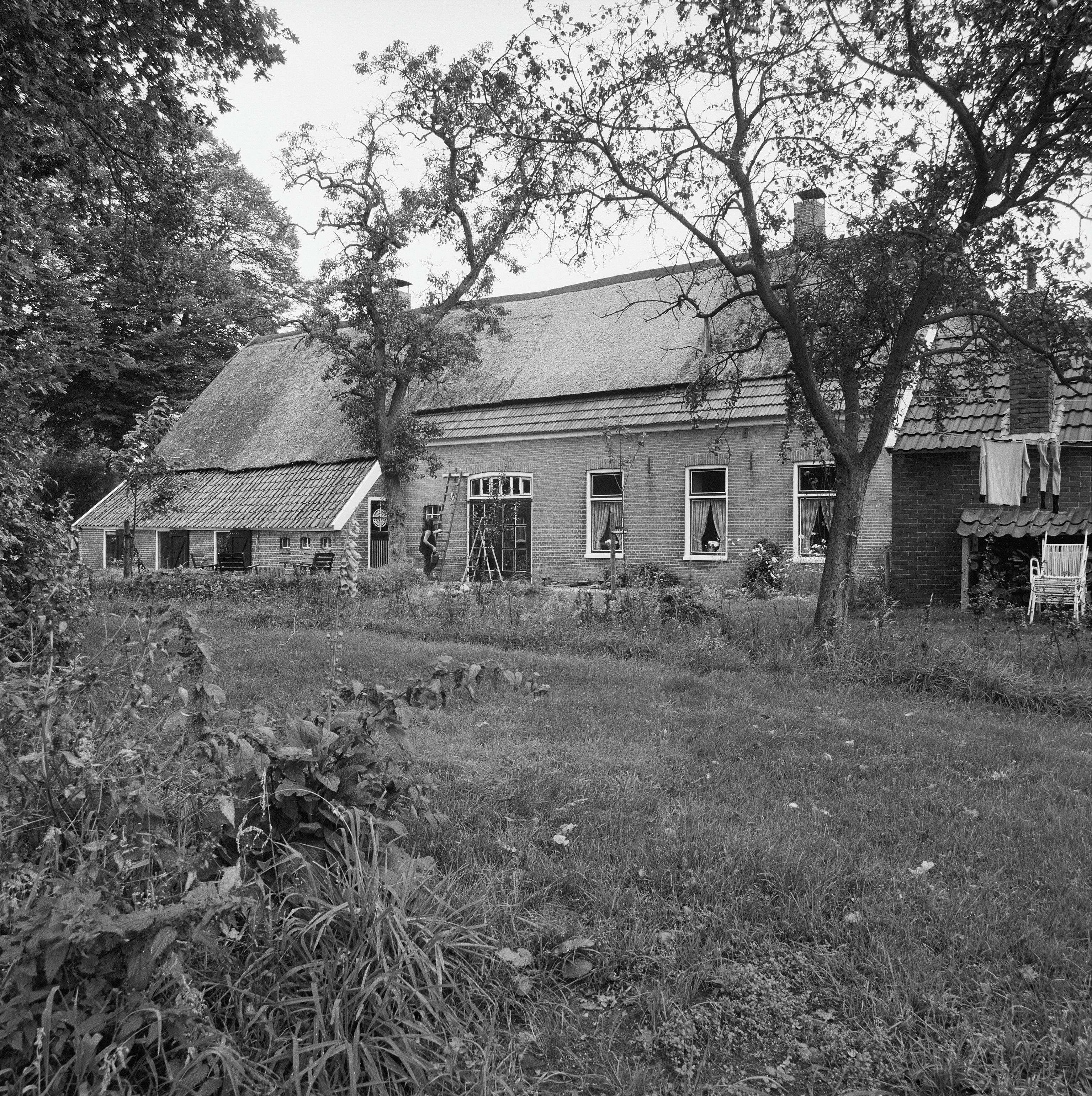
- Farm in Ees

- Location in the province of Drenthe in the Netherlands
- Coordinates: 52°54′N 6°48′E
- Country: Netherlands
- Province: Drenthe
- Municipality: Borger-Odoorn

Area
  - Total: 7.79 km^{2} (3.01 sq mi)
- Elevation: 17 m (56 ft)

Population (2021)
  - Total: 325
  - Density: 41.7/km^{2} (108/sq mi)
- Time zone: UTC+1 (CET)
  - Summer (DST): UTC+2 (CEST)
- Postal code: 9536
- Dialing code: 0599

Ees is a village in the Dutch province of Drenthe. It is a part of the municipality of Borger-Odoorn, and lies about 17 km north of Emmen.

The village was first mentioned in 1263 as de Ese, and means "farmland around a village".

Situated close to the town of Borger, Ees is characterized by pleasant style homes and a large expanse of woodland to the South East which contains a network of bike paths and horse trails (ruiterpads) throughout the woods.
