= Vledderveen =

Vledderveen may refer to:

- Vledderveen, Drenthe
- Vledderveen, Groningen
