= Westerveld =

- Municipality
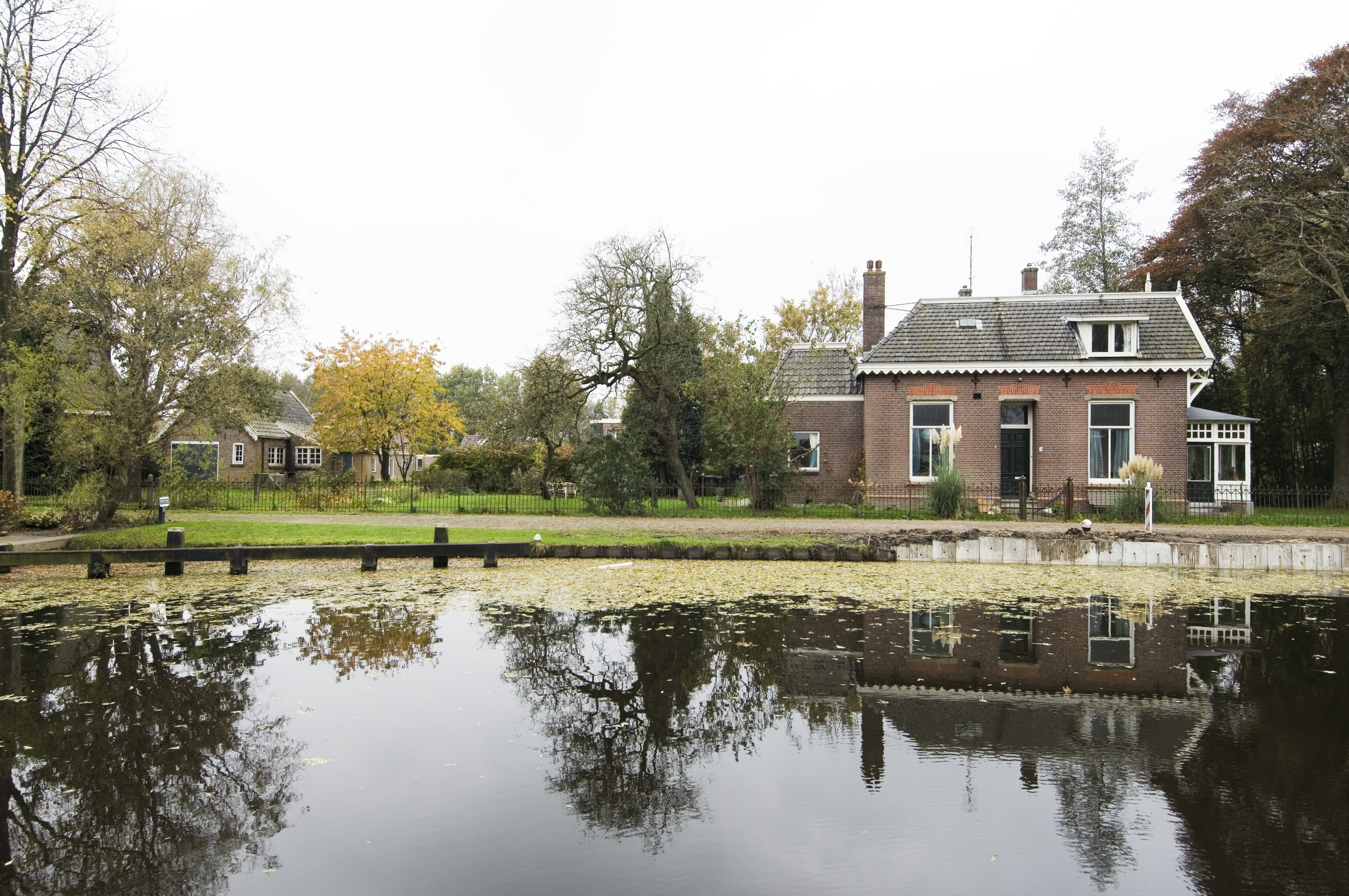
- Town of Dwingeloo

- Flag Coat of arms

- Location in Drenthe
- Coordinates: 52°52′N 6°19′E
- Country: Netherlands
- Province: Drenthe
- Established: 1 January 1998

Government
  - Body: Municipal council
  - Mayor: Rikus Jager (CDA)

Area
  - Total: 282.74 km^{2} (109.17 sq mi)
  - Land: 278.35 km^{2} (107.47 sq mi)
  - Water: 4.39 km^{2} (1.69 sq mi)
- Elevation: 8 m (26 ft)

Population (January 2021)
  - Total: 19,661
  - Density: 71/km^{2} (180/sq mi)
- Time zone: UTC+1 (CET)
  - Summer (DST): UTC+2 (CEST)
- Postcode: Parts of 7000 and 8000 range
- Area code: 0521, 0561
- Website: gemeentewesterveld.nl

Westerveld (Dutch pronunciation: [ˌʋɛstərˈvɛlt]) is a municipality in the northeastern Netherlands.

The municipality Westerveld was established in 1998 out of the municipalities of Diever, Dwingeloo, Havelte, and Vledder. Westerveld is crossed by a channel, the Drentsche Hoofdvaart. There are also two National Parks situated in the municipality, the Drents-Friese Wold and Dwingelderveld.

== Population centres ==
- Boschoord
- Darp
- Diever
- Dieverbrug
- Doldersum
- Dwingeloo
- Eemster
- Frederiksoord
- Geeuwenbrug
- Havelte
- Havelterberg
- Leggeloo
- Lhee
- Lheebroek
- Nijensleek
- Oude Willem
- Uffelte
- Vledder
- Vledderveen
- Wapse
- Wapserveen
- Wateren
- Wilhelminaoord
- Wittelte
- Zorgvlied

Dwingeloo is a town halfway between Meppel and Assen. The radio telescope of the Dwingeloo Radio Observatory is located on the edge of the Dwingeloo Heath, 3 km (2 mi) south of the village.

=== Topography ===
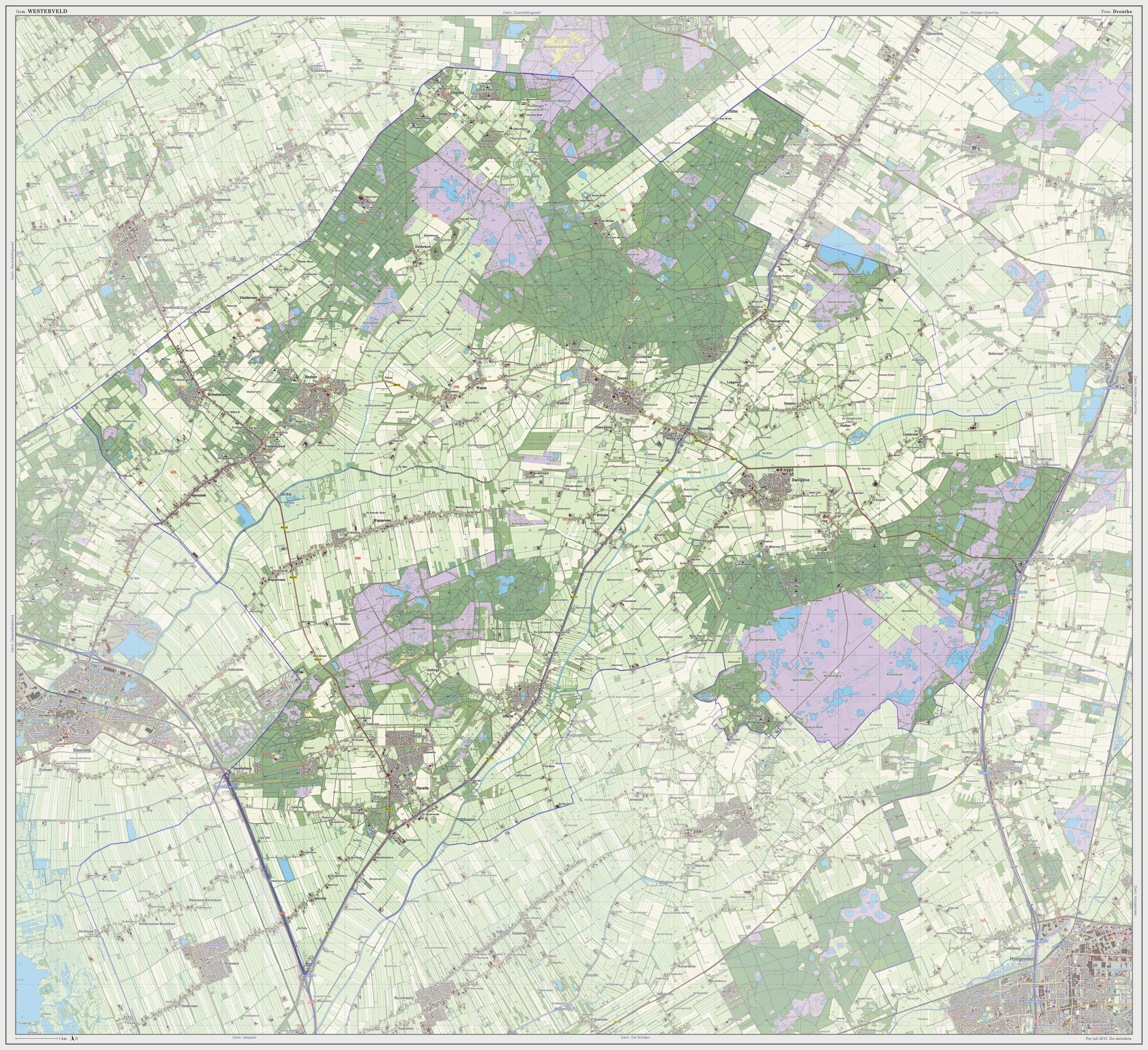

Dutch Topographic map of the municipality of Westerveld, 2013.

== Notable people ==
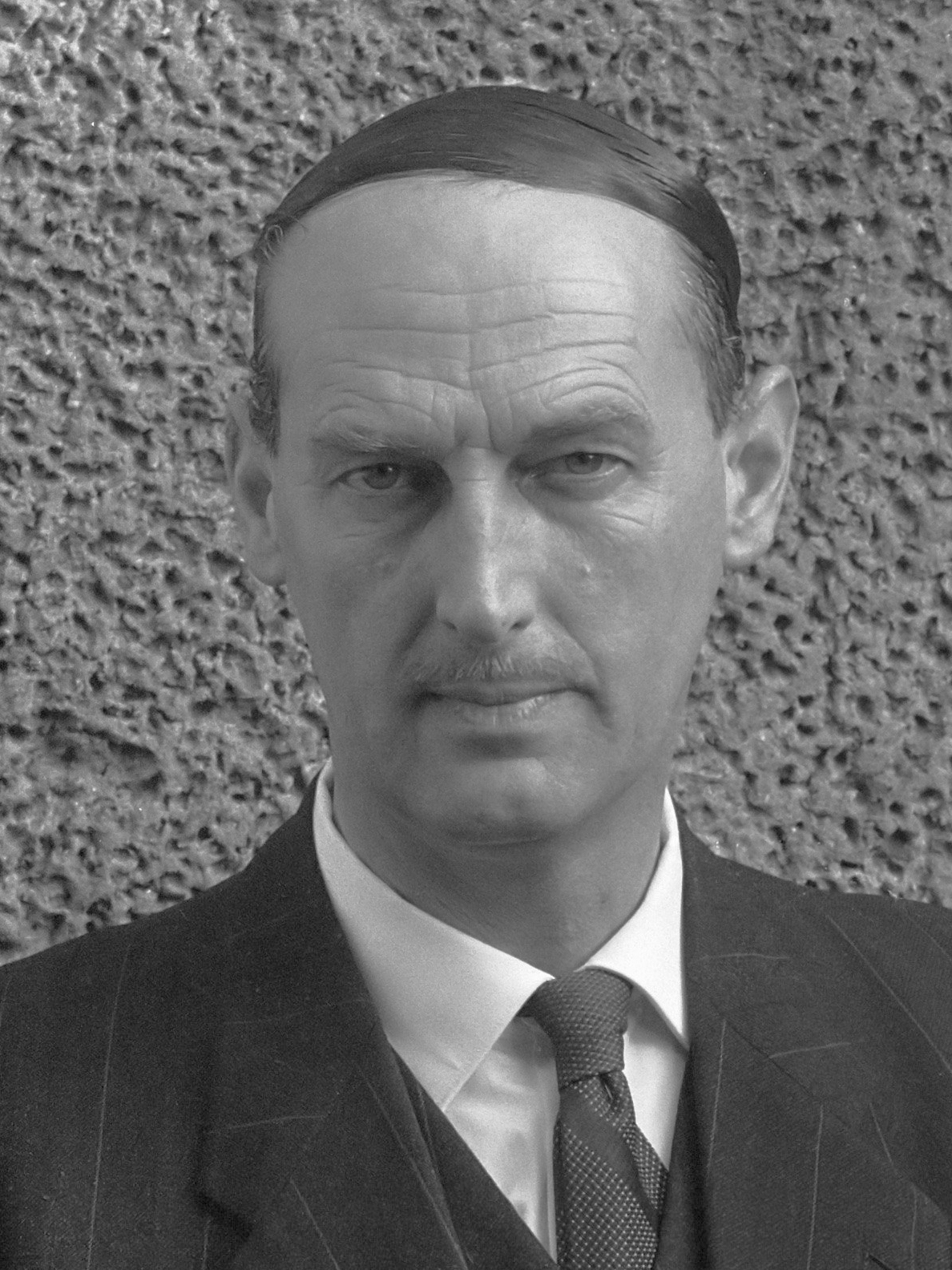
Hans Hugenholtz, 1961

- Sicco Mansholt (1908 in Ulrum – 1995) politician, 4th President of the European Commission 1972-1973
- John Hugenholtz (1914 in Vledder – 1995) designer of race tracks and cars
- Jan Pol (born 1942 in Wateren) veterinarian, & TV Personality
- Jan Mulder (born 1943 in Diever) politician and Member of the European Parliament
- Klaske Hiemstra (born 1954 in Vledder) a West Frisian-language writer
- Maarten Treurniet (born 1959) film director, brought up in Dwingeloo
- Merlijn Twaalfhoven (born 1976 in Wapserveen) Dutch composer

=== Sport ===
- Gerrit Postma (1894 in Vledderveen – 1969) discus thrower, competed at the 1928 Summer Olympics
- Tollien Schuurman (1913 in Zorgvlied – 1994) sprint runner, competed at the 1932 Summer Olympics
- Riëtte Fledderus (born 1977) retired volleyball player, competed at the 1996 Summer Olympics

== Gallery ==
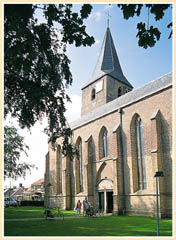
Hervormde Karke Dever

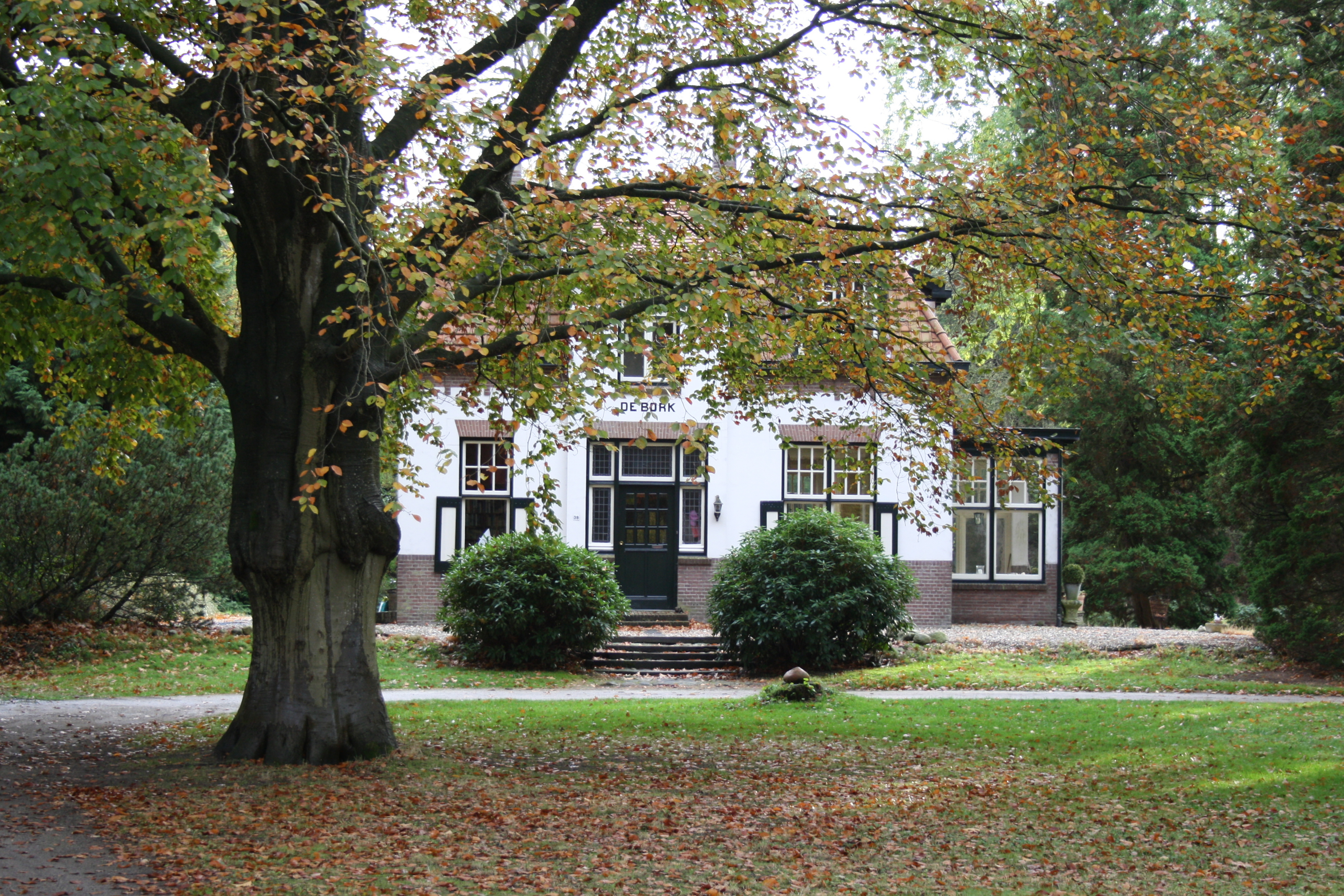
Dwingeloo - De Bork - Westeinde

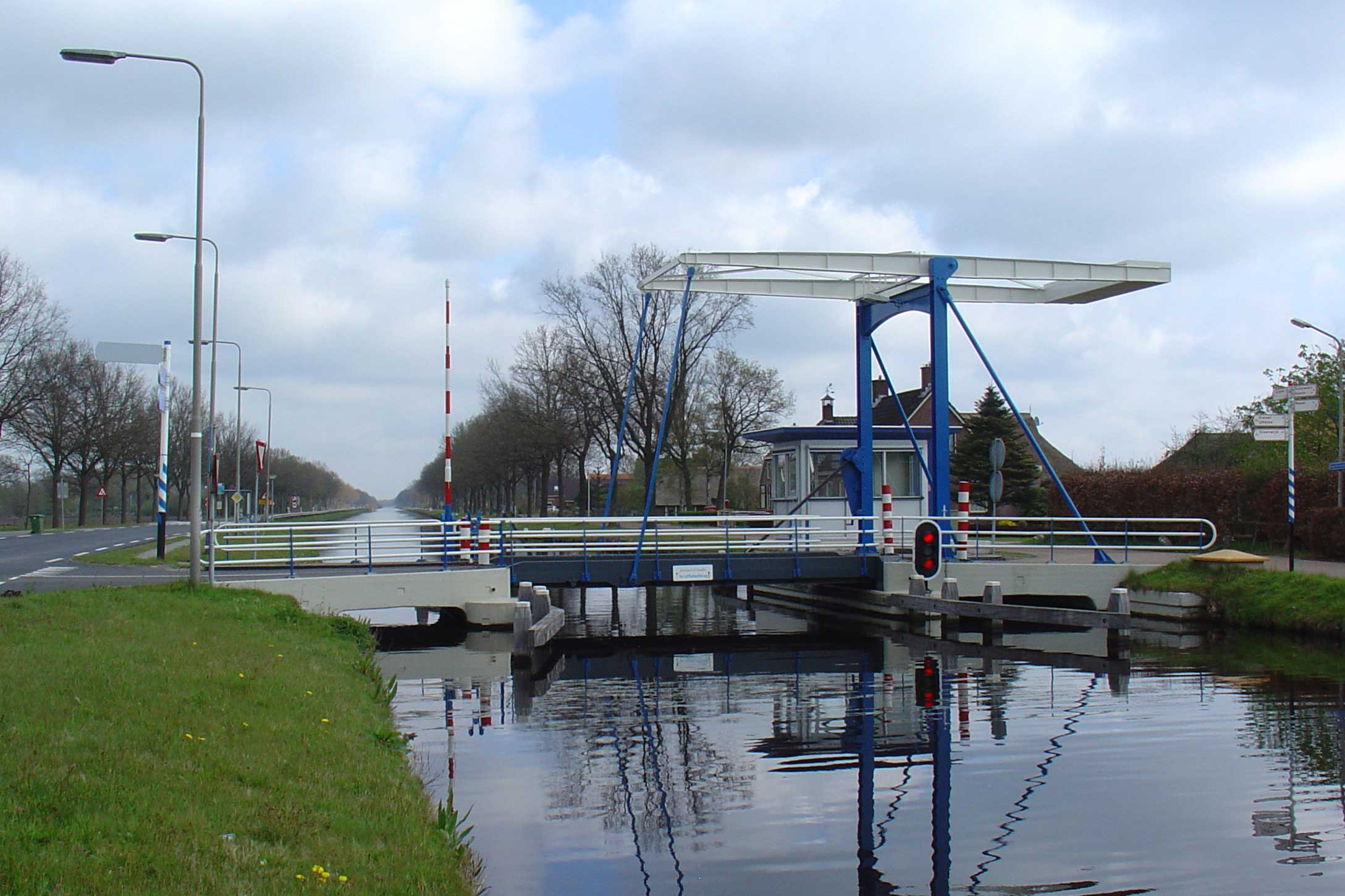
Drentsche Hoofdvaart, Uffelterbrug

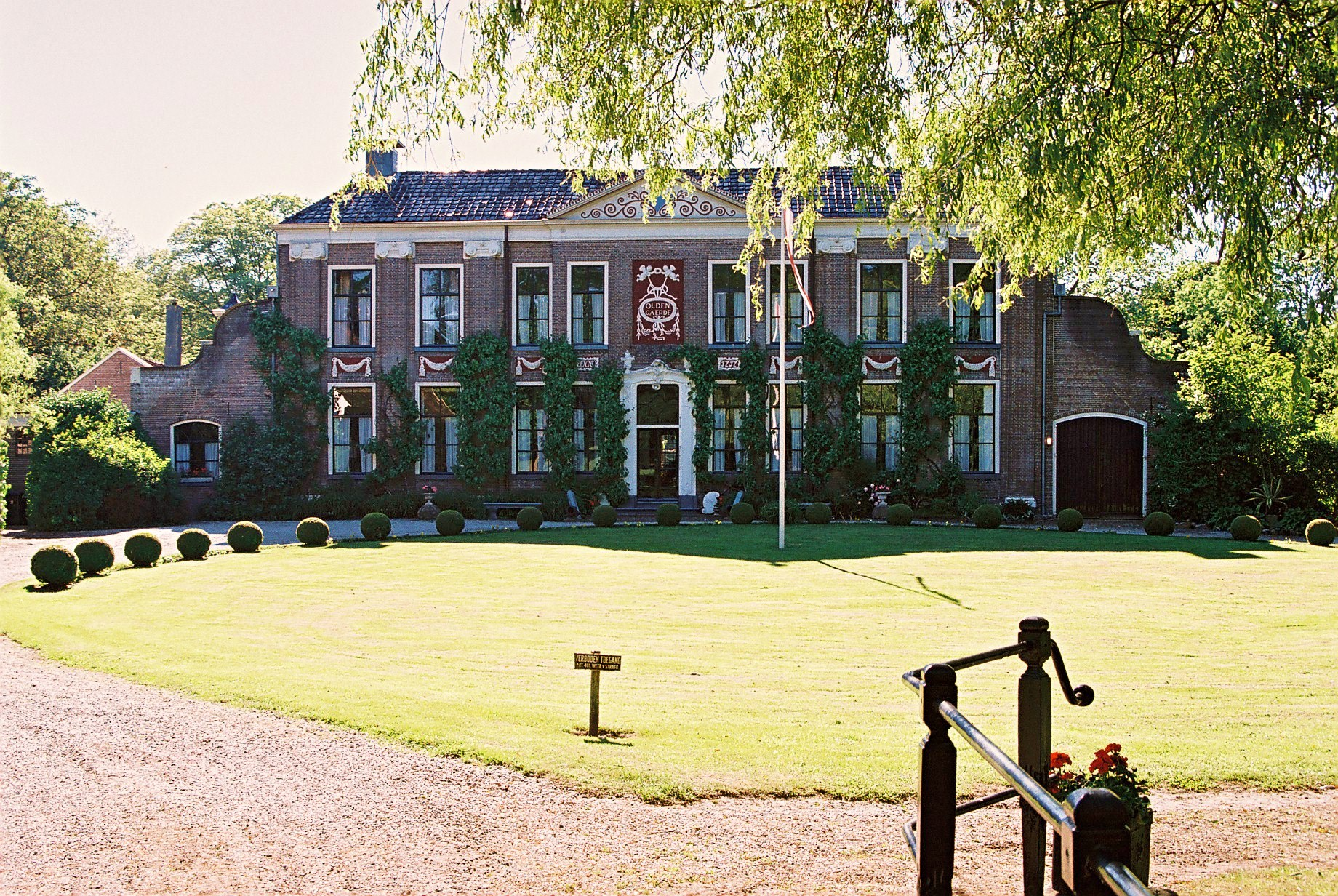
De havezate Oldengaerde te Dwingeloo
