= Wittelte =

- Village
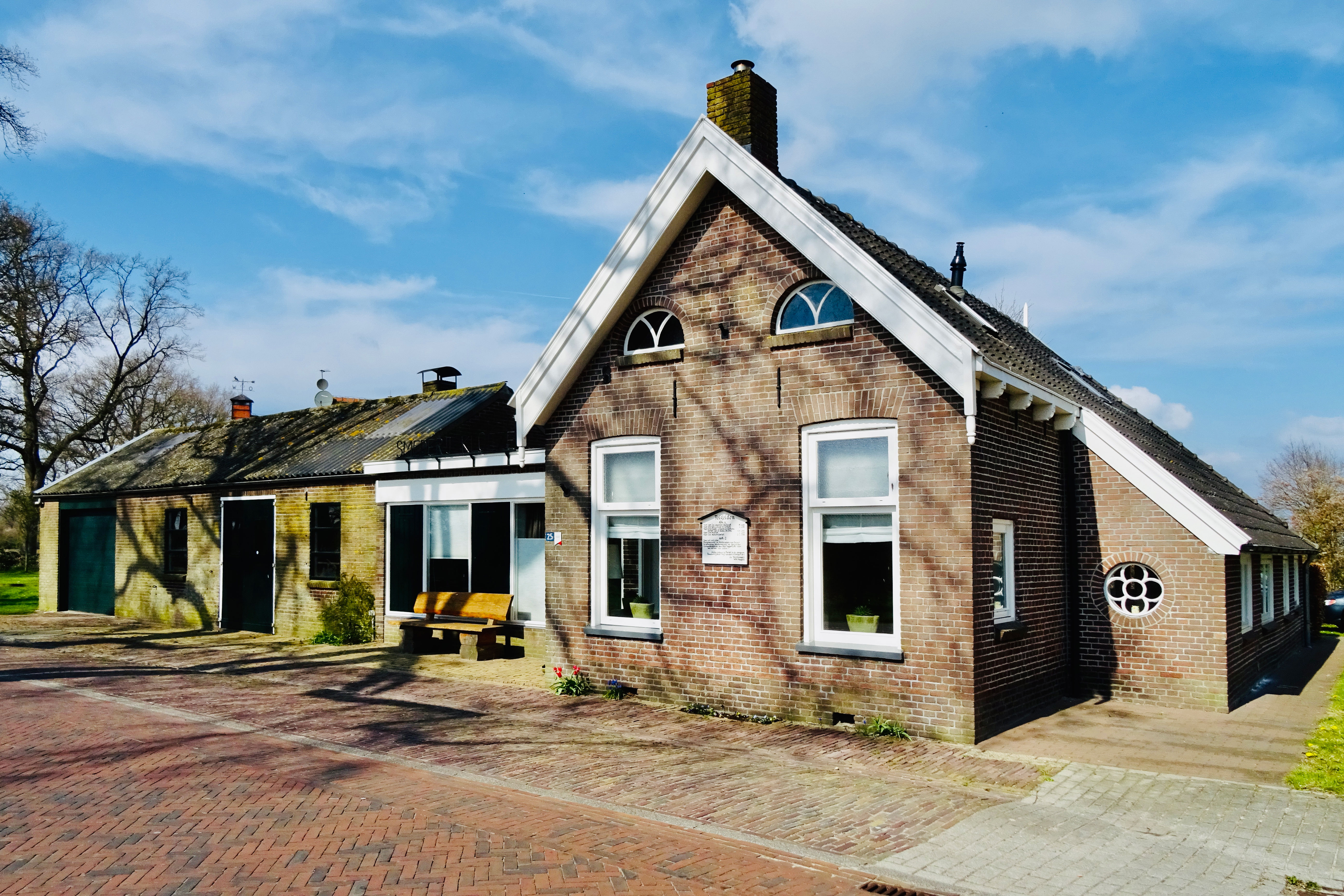
- Toll house Wittelte

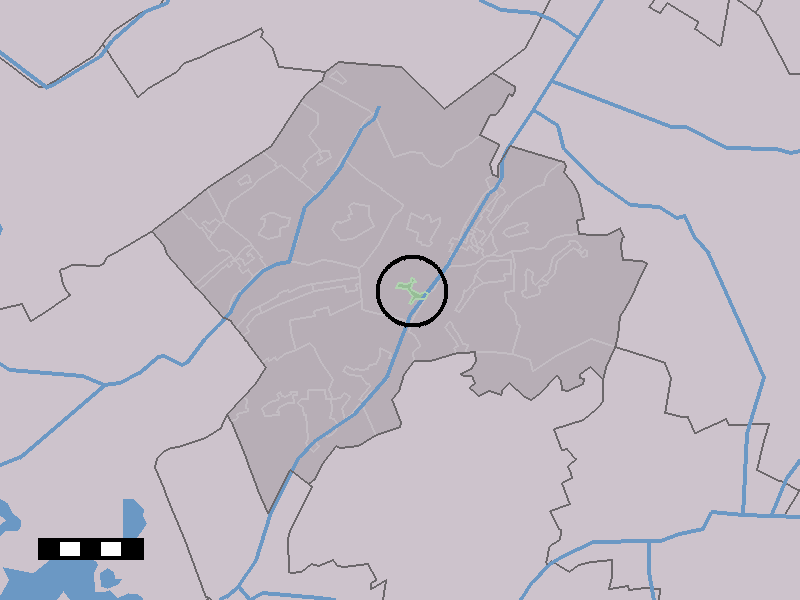
- Wittelte in the municipality of Westerveld.

- Location in the Netherlands Wittelte (Netherlands)
- Coordinates: 52°49′43″N 6°18′25″E
- Country: Netherlands
- Province: Drenthe
- Municipality: Westerveld

Area
  - Total: 0.51 km^{2} (0.20 sq mi)
- Elevation: 6 m (20 ft)

Population (2021)
  - Total: 130
  - Density: 250/km^{2} (660/sq mi)
- Time zone: UTC+1 (CET)
  - Summer (DST): UTC+2 (CEST)
- Postal code: 7986
- Dialing code: 0521

Wittelte is a village in the Dutch province of Drenthe. It is a part of the municipality of Westerveld, and lies about 15 km northwest of Hoogeveen.

Wittelte is first mentioned as Withelte in 1040 when Emperor Henry III donates estates from a certain Uffo and his brothers, located in Uffelte, Wittelte and Peelo, to Bishop Bernold of Utrecht.
