= Lheebroek =

- Hamlet
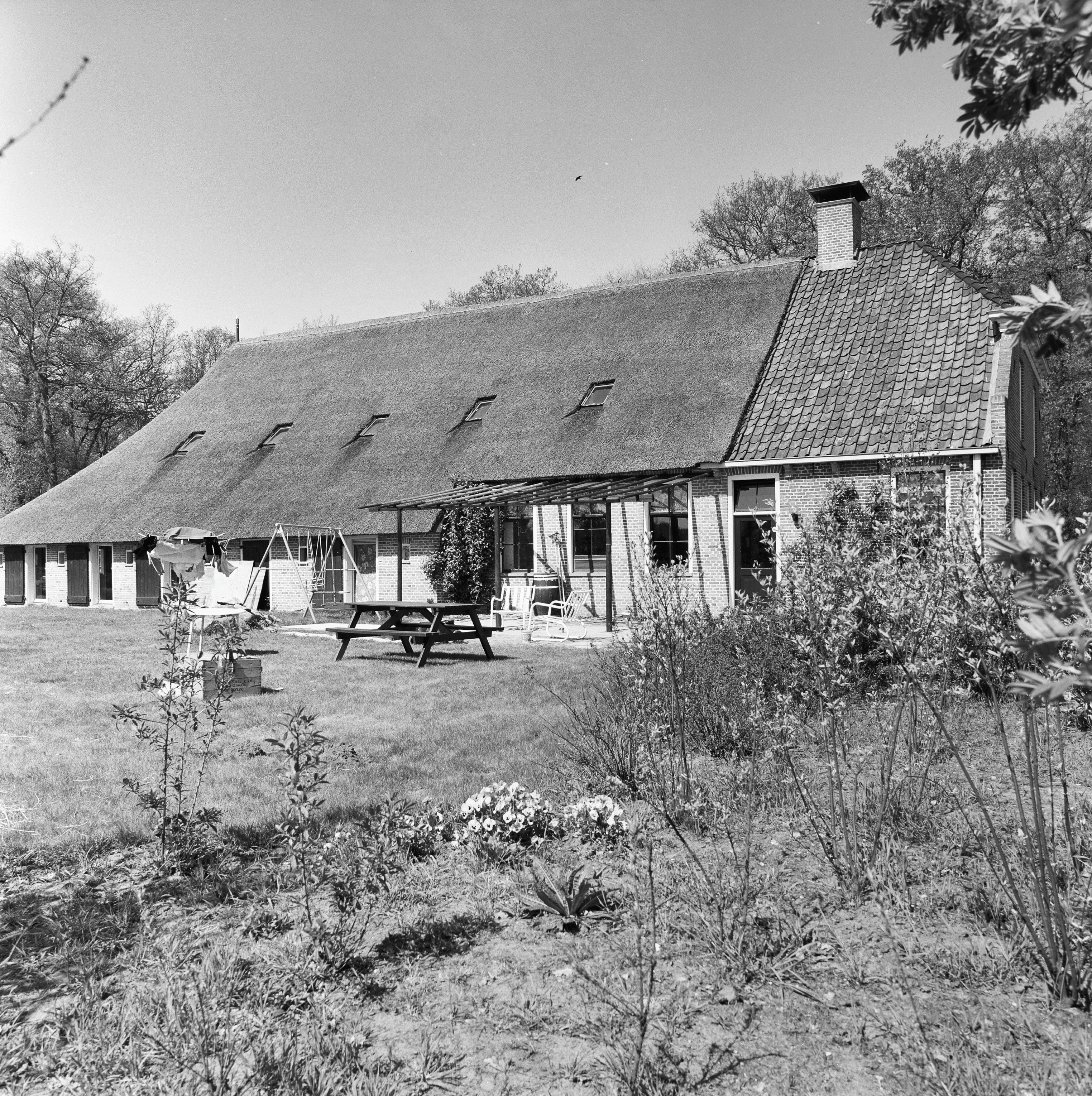
- Farm in Lheebroek

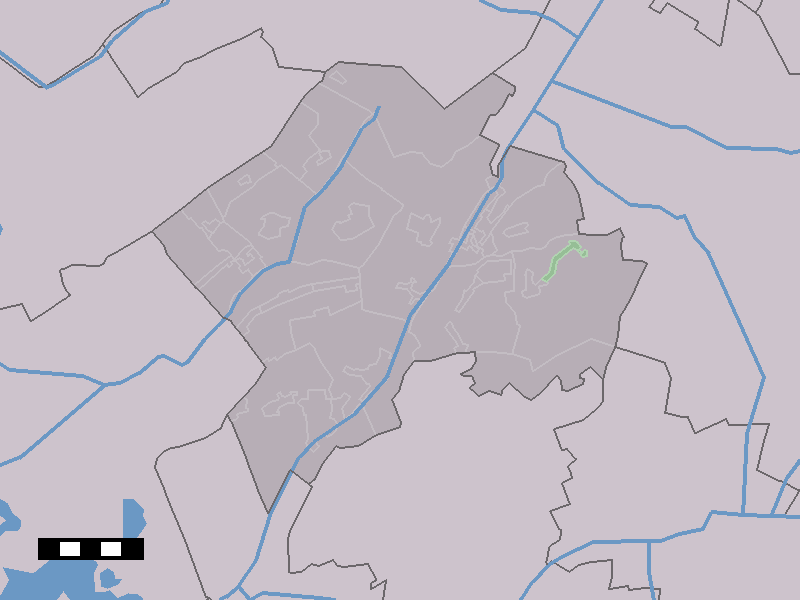
- Lheebroek in the municipality of Westerveld.

- Location in the Drenth Lheebroek (Netherlands)
- Coordinates: 52°50′49″N 6°25′31″E
- Country: Netherlands
- Province: Drenthe
- Municipality: Westerveld

Area
  - Total: 0.85 km^{2} (0.33 sq mi)
- Elevation: 10 m (33 ft)

Population (2021)
  - Total: 120
  - Density: 140/km^{2} (370/sq mi)
- Time zone: UTC+1 (CET)
  - Summer (DST): UTC+2 (CEST)
- Postal code: 7991
- Dialing code: 0521

Lheebroek is a hamlet in the Dutch province of Drenthe. It is a part of the municipality of Westerveld, and lies about 14 km (9 mi) north of Hoogeveen.

The hamlet was first mentioned between 1381 and 1383 as to Lederbroke, and means "swampy land belonging to Lhee". Lheebroek was home to 40 people in 1840.
