= Boschoord =

- Hamlet
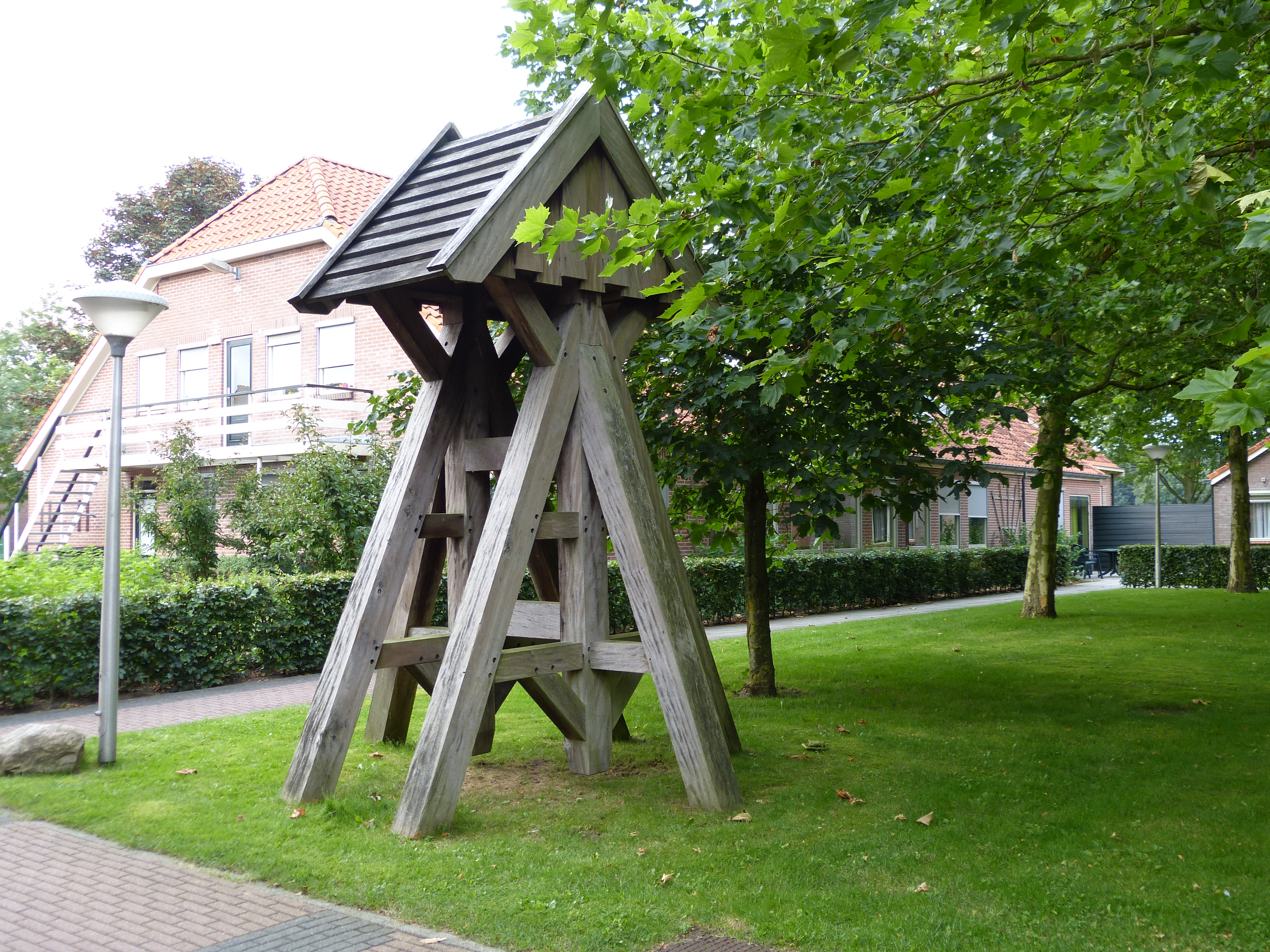
- Bell tower in Boschoord

- Location in province of Drenthe in the Netherlands Boschoord (Netherlands)
- Coordinates: 52°53′54″N 6°13′34″E
- Country: Netherlands
- Province: Drenthe
- Municipality: Westerveld

Area
  - Total: 5.39 km^{2} (2.08 sq mi)
- Elevation: 8 m (26 ft)

Population (2021)
  - Total: 230
  - Density: 43/km^{2} (110/sq mi)
- Time zone: UTC+1 (CET)
  - Summer (DST): UTC+2 (CEST)
- Postal code: 8387
- Dialing code: 0561

Boschoord is a hamlet in the north-eastern Netherlands. It is located in the municipality of Westerveld, Drenthe.

It was first mentioned in 1846 as Kolonie No 7. It was founded as work colony of the Maatschappij van Weldadigheid. In 1907, it was named Boschoord, and Bosch is a reference to Johannes van de Bosch, the founder of Maatschappij van Weldadigheid. Landgoed Boschoord is still owned by the company, and has become a 650 hectares (1,600 acres) nature area which consists of forest and moorland.
