= Dieverbrug =

- Village
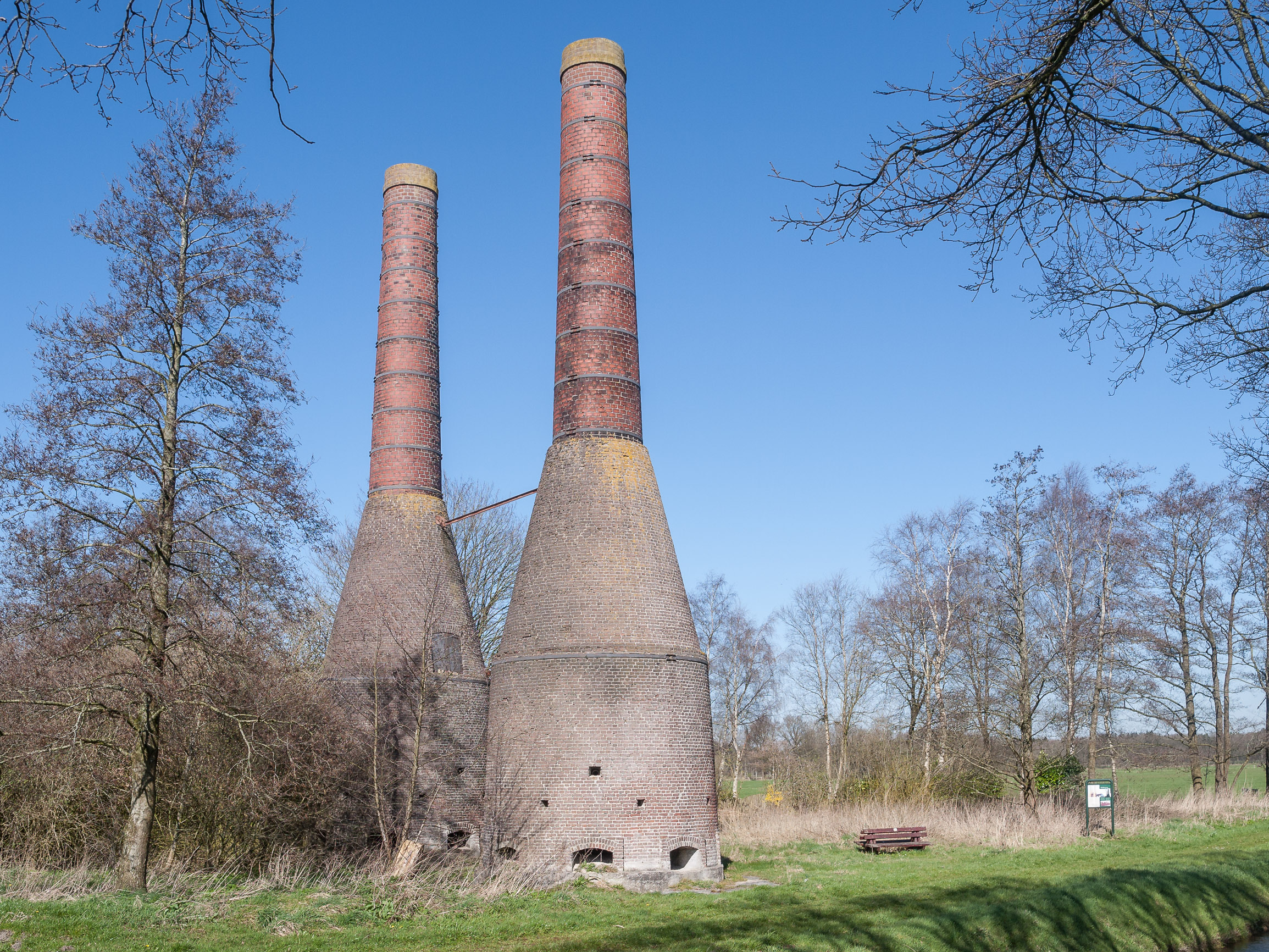
- Former lime kiln

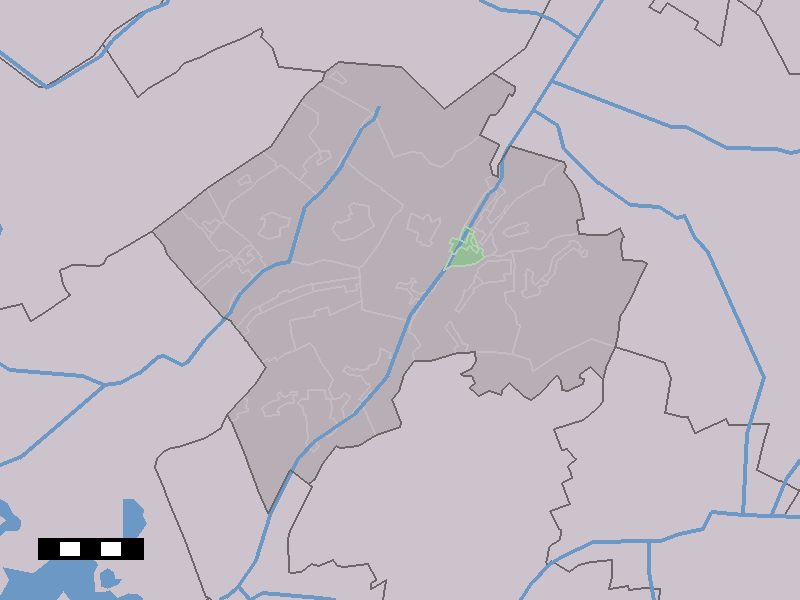
- Dieverbrug in the municipality of Westerveld.

- Location in the Netherlands Dieverbrug (Netherlands)
- Coordinates: 52°50′49″N 6°20′27″E
- Country: Netherlands
- Province: Drenthe
- Municipality: Westerveld

Area
  - Total: 2.38 km^{2} (0.92 sq mi)
- Elevation: 8 m (26 ft)

Population (2021)
  - Total: 310
  - Density: 130/km^{2} (340/sq mi)
- Time zone: UTC+1 (CET)
  - Summer (DST): UTC+2 (CEST)
- Postal code: 7984 & 7991
- Dialing code: 0521

Dieverbrug is a village in the Dutch province of Drenthe. It is a part of the municipality of Westerveld, and lies about 17 km northwest of Hoogeveen.

The village was first mentioned in 1841 as "Dieverbrug of Dieverschebrug", and refers to the bridge which was built around 1770 over the Drentsche Hoofdvaart on the road from Diever to Dwingeloo.

Dieverbrug was home to 45 people in 1840. The lime kiln was built in 1925. It remained in function until 1952, but has remained as the local landmark.

== Gallery ==
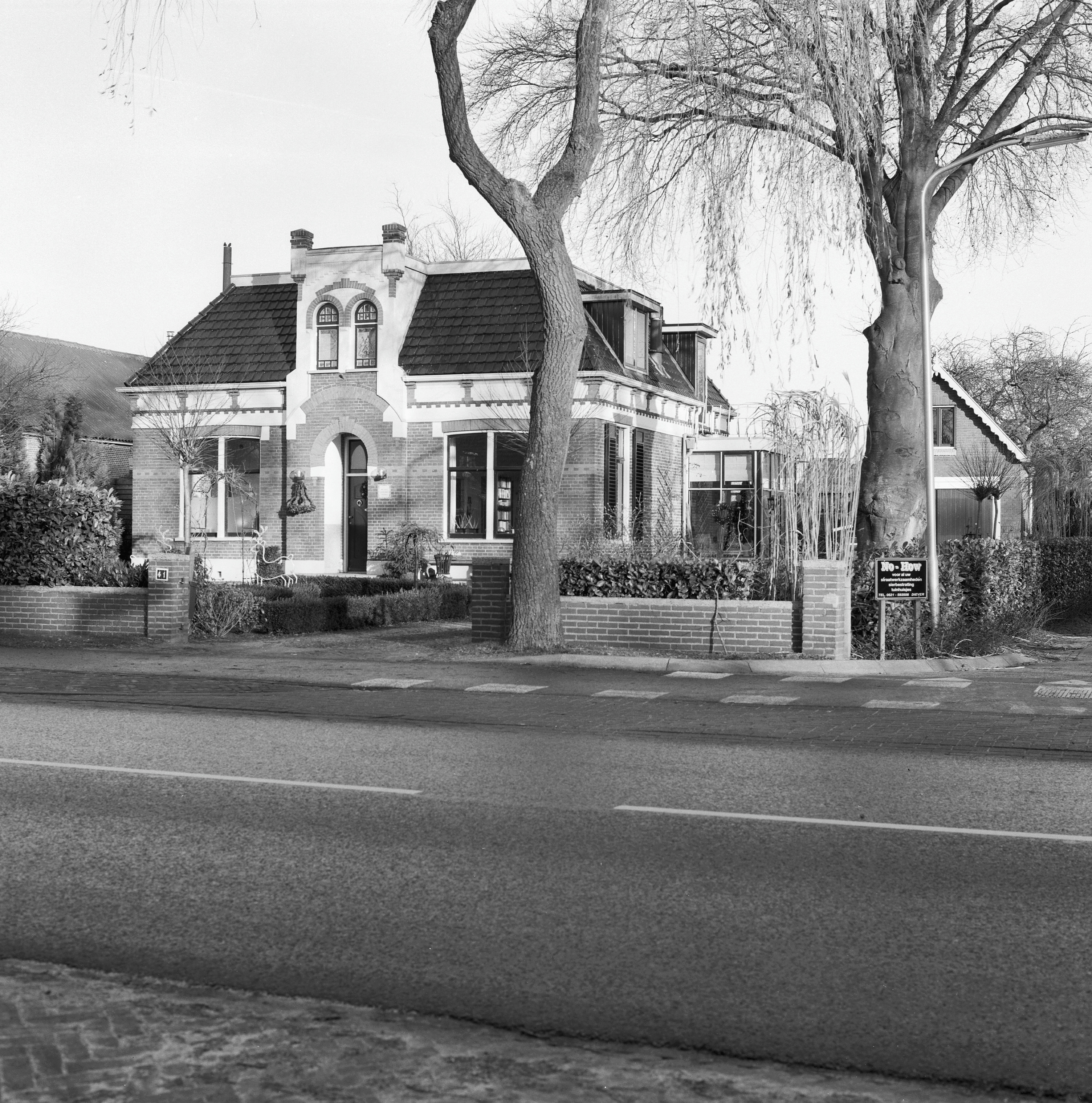
Farm in Dieverbrug
