= Doldersum =

- Hamlet
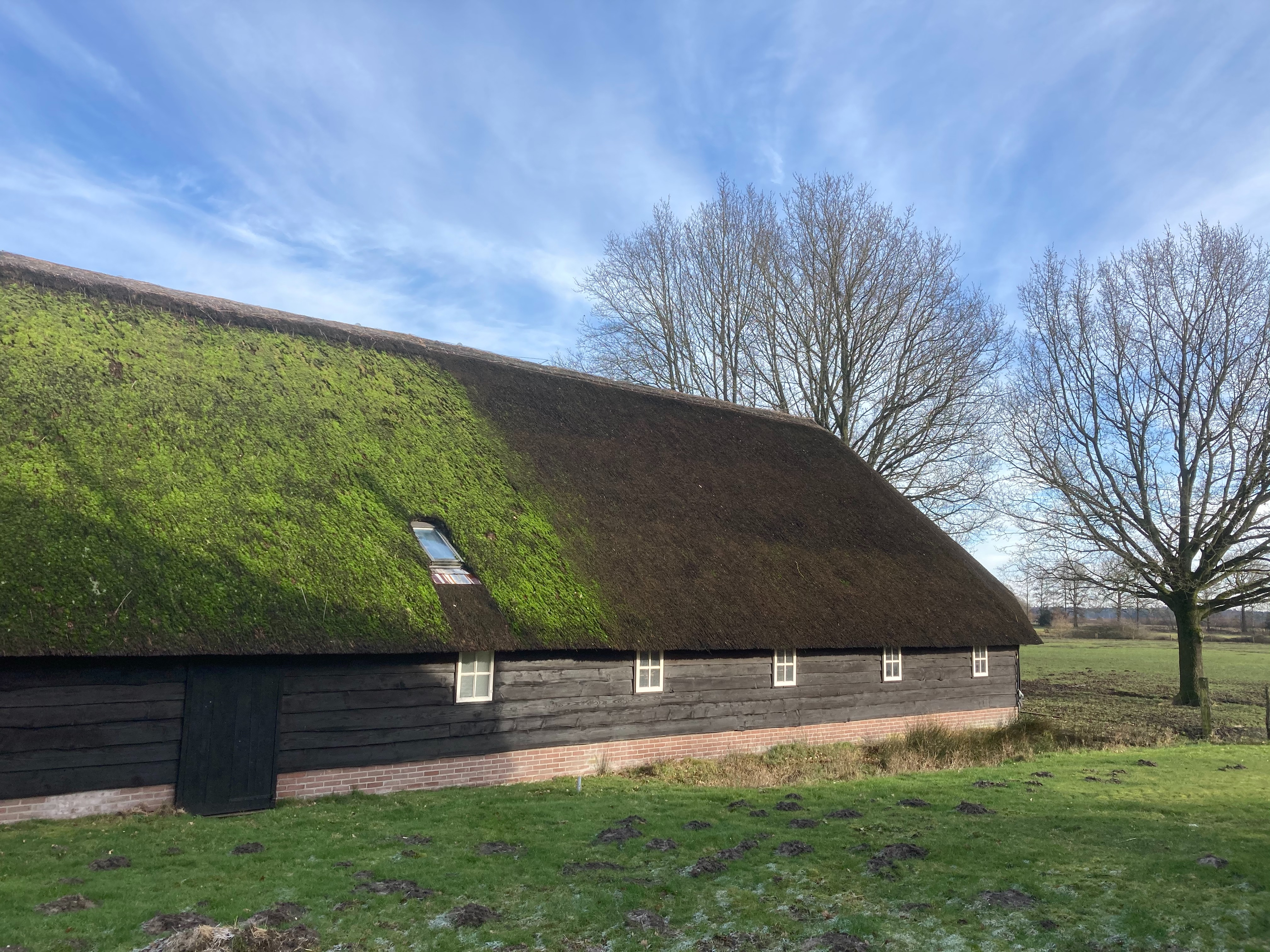
- Farm in Doldersum

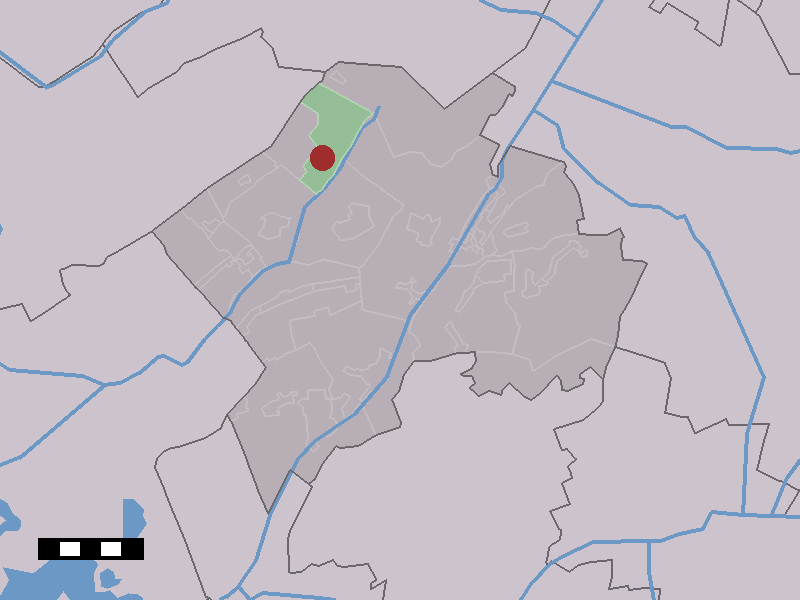
- The village (dark red) and the statistical district (light green) of Doldersum in the municipality of Westerveld.

- Location in province of Drenthe in the Netherlands Doldersum (Netherlands)
- Coordinates: 52°53′N 6°15′E
- Country: Netherlands
- Province: Drenthe
- Municipality: Westerveld

Area
  - Total: 9.28 km^{2} (3.58 sq mi)
- Elevation: 6 m (20 ft)

Population (2021)
  - Total: 125
  - Density: 13.5/km^{2} (34.9/sq mi)
- Time zone: UTC+1 (CET)
  - Summer (DST): UTC+2 (CEST)
- Postal code: 8386
- Dialing code: 0521

Doldersum is a hamlet in the Dutch province of Drenthe. It is a part of the municipality of Westerveld, and lies about 24 km northwest of Hoogeveen.

It was first mentioned in 1402 as Doldersem. The etymology is unknown.

On 7 to 8 September 1944, 21 young men escaped from a forced labour camp in Vledder. The resistance hid them in the forest of Doldersum. One of the hiding places was discovered, and seven were shot. One survived, but remained handicapped. A monument has been placed on the heath in their honour.
