= Gerrit Postma =

Dutch discus thrower (1894–1969)

Personal information
- Nationality: Dutch
- Born: 25 December 1894 Vledderveen, Netherlands
- Died: 3 November 1969 (aged 74)

Sport
- Sport: Athletics
- Event: Discus throw

Gerrit Postma (25 December 1894 – 3 November 1969) was a Dutch athlete. He competed in the men's discus throw at the 1928 Summer Olympics.
