= Eemster =

- Hamlet
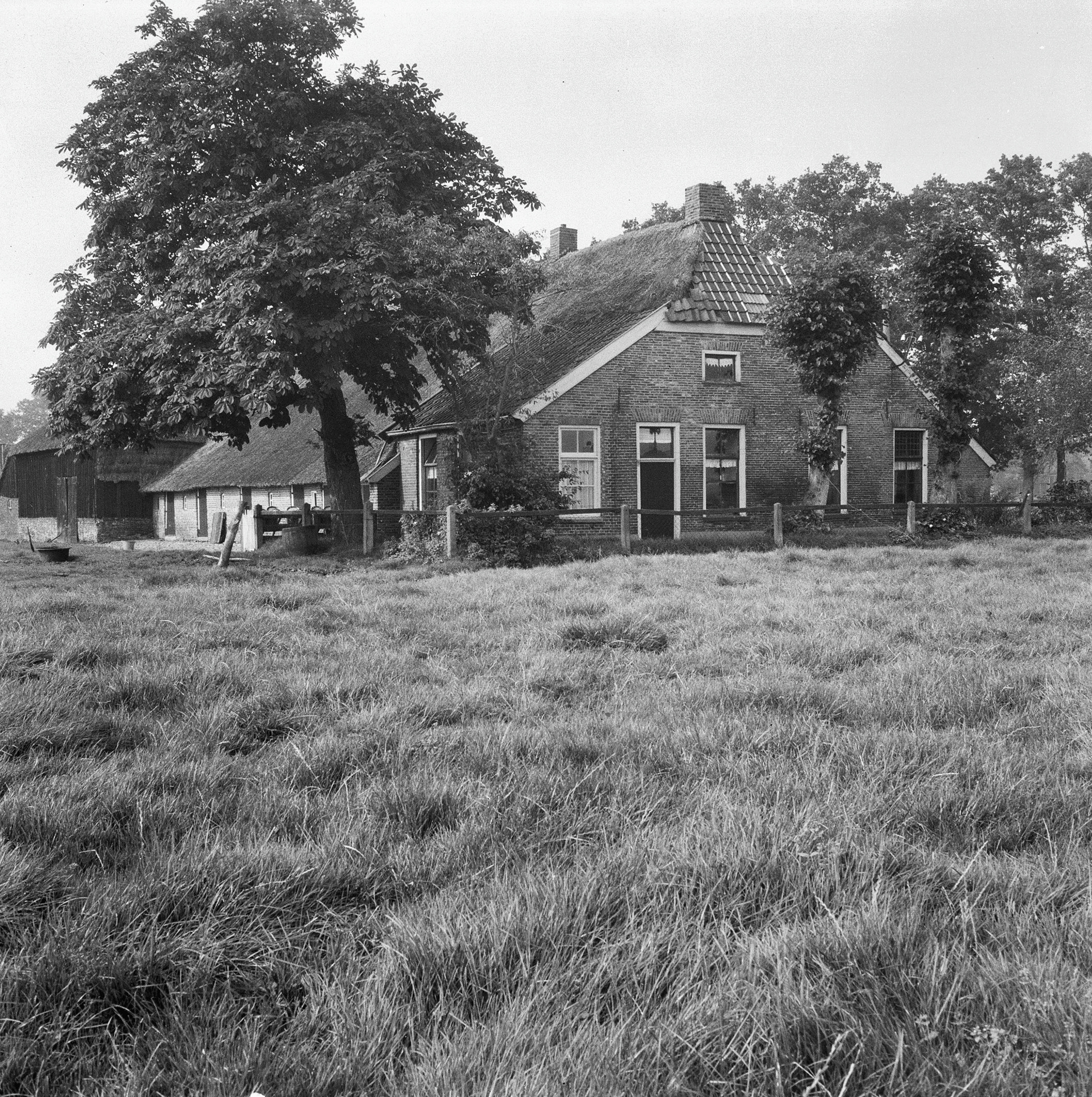
- Farm in Eemster

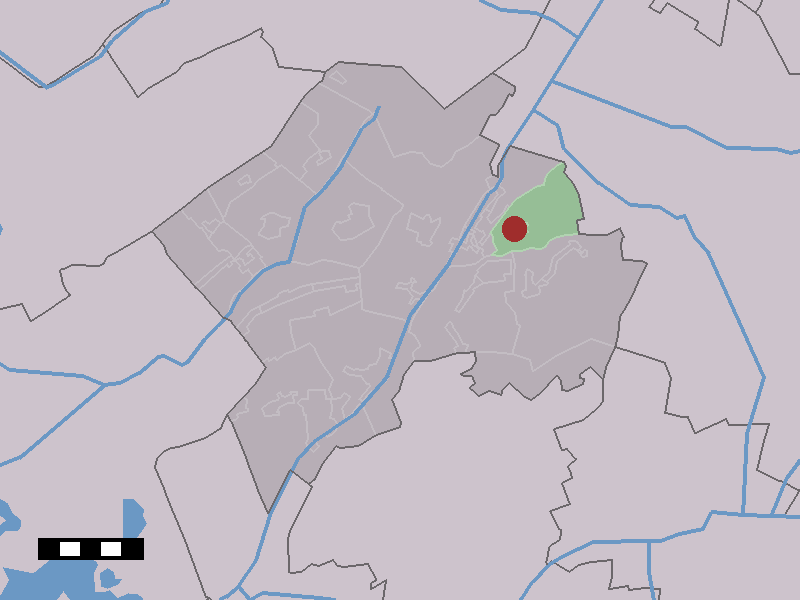
- The village (dark red) and the statistical district (light green) of Eemster in the municipality of Westerveld.

- Location in the province of Drenthe Eemster (Netherlands)
- Coordinates: 52°51′14″N 6°23′13″E
- Country: Netherlands
- Province: Drenthe
- Municipality: Westerveld

Area
  - Total: 11.63 km^{2} (4.49 sq mi)
- Elevation: 10 m (33 ft)

Population (2021)
  - Total: 340
  - Density: 29/km^{2} (76/sq mi)
- Time zone: UTC+1 (CET)
  - Summer (DST): UTC+2 (CEST)
- Postal code: 7991
- Dialing code: 0521

Eemster is a hamlet in the Dutch province of Drenthe. It is a part of the municipality of Westerveld, and lies about 16 km north of Hoogeveen.

The hamlet was first mentioned in 1210 as Hemsere. The etymology is unclear. Eemster was home to 179 people in 1840.
