= Nijensleek =

- Village
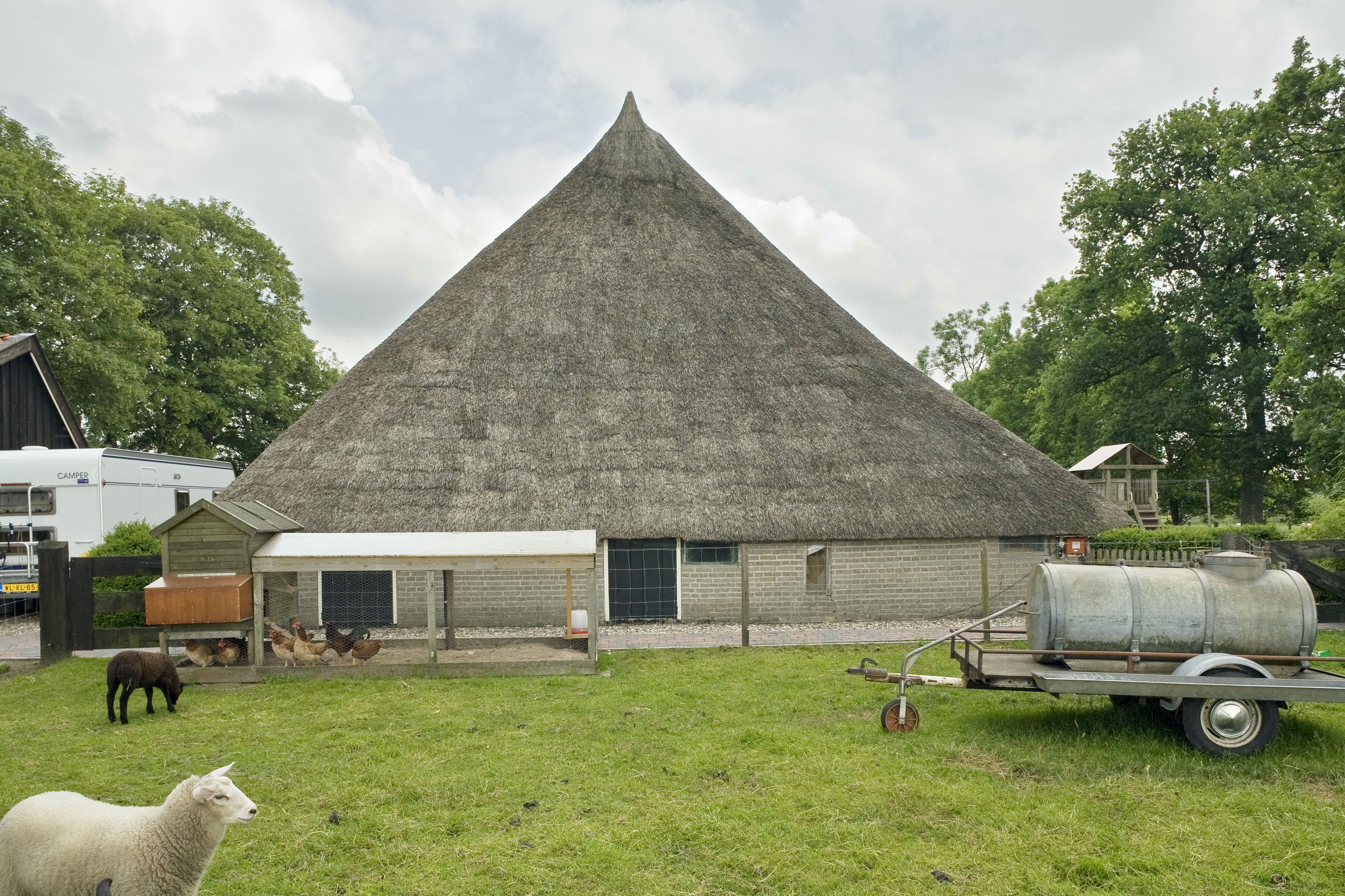
- Farm in Nijensleek

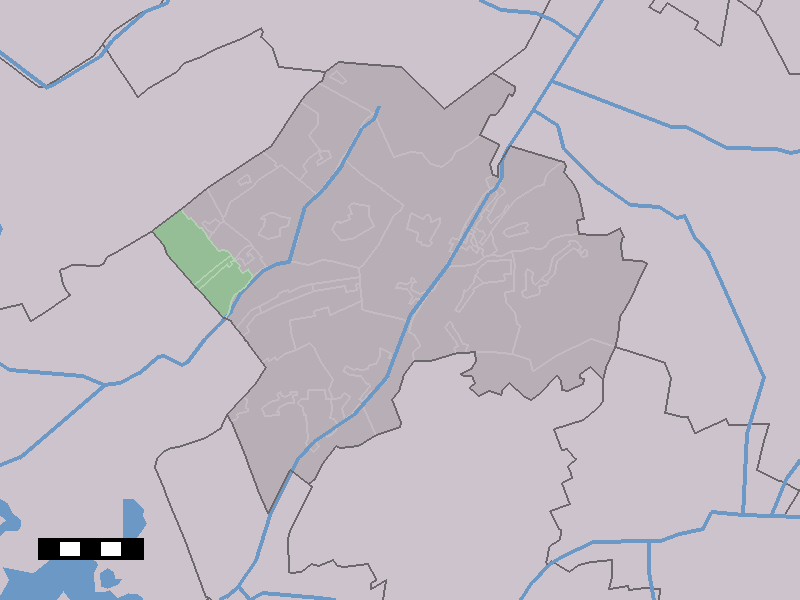
- The town centre (dark green) and the statistical district (light green) of Nijensleek in the municipality of Westerveld.

- Location in the Netherlands Nijensleek (Netherlands)
- Coordinates: 52°50′23″N 6°10′18″E
- Country: Netherlands
- Province: Drenthe
- Municipality: Westerveld

Area
  - Total: 10.92 km^{2} (4.22 sq mi)
- Elevation: 3.7 m (12 ft)

Population (2021)
  - Total: 565
  - Density: 51.7/km^{2} (134/sq mi)
- Time zone: UTC+1 (CET)
  - Summer (DST): UTC+2 (CEST)
- Postal code: 8383
- Dialing code: 0521

Nijensleek is a village in the Dutch province of Drenthe. It is a part of the municipality of Westerveld, and lies about 5 km north of Steenwijk.

The village was first mentioned in 1402 as Nyensleker bure, and means "new natural stream". Nijensleek is a road village which developed in the Late Middle Ages as a peat excavation settlement.

Nijensleek was home to 363 people in 1840. In 1934, a Reformed Church was built as an aisleless church with ridge turret.
