= Leggeloo =

- Hamlet
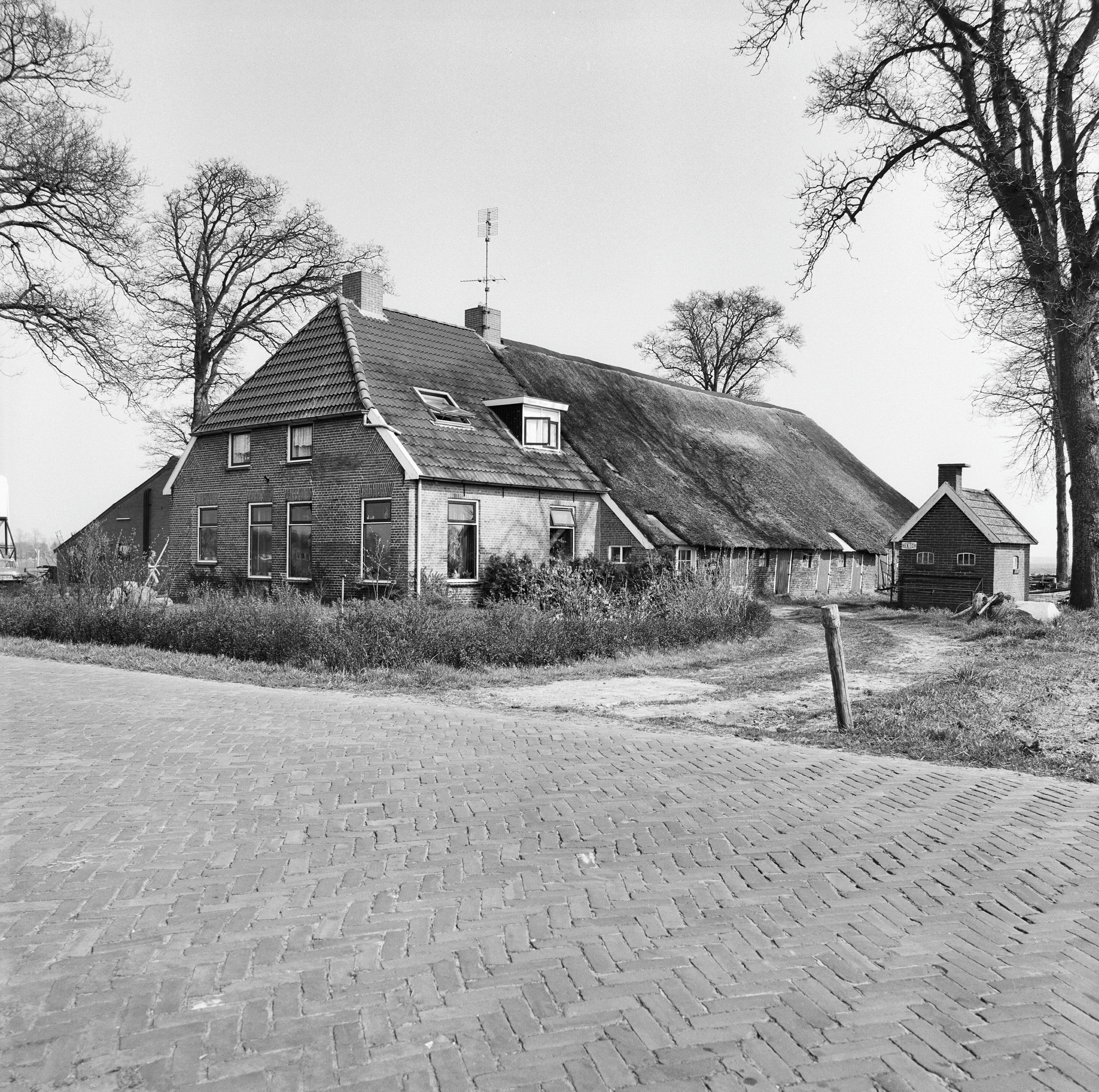
- Farm in Leggeloo

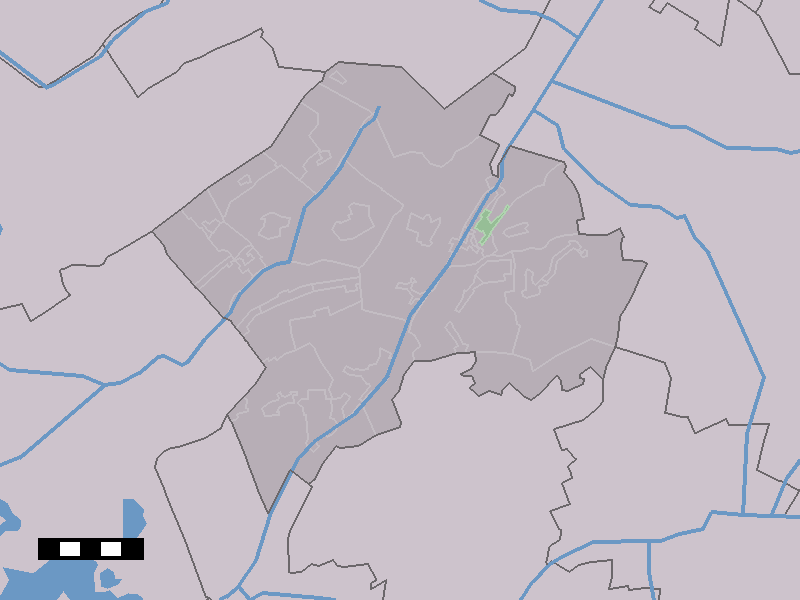
- Leggeloo in the municipality of Westerveld.

- Location in the Netherlands Leggeloo (Netherlands)
- Coordinates: 52°51′6″N 6°21′52″E
- Country: Netherlands
- Province: Drenthe
- Municipality: Westerveld

Area
  - Total: 0.95 km^{2} (0.37 sq mi)
- Elevation: 10 m (33 ft)

Population (2021)
  - Total: 135
  - Density: 140/km^{2} (370/sq mi)
- Time zone: UTC+1 (CET)
  - Summer (DST): UTC+2 (CEST)
- Postal code: 7991
- Dialing code: 0521

Leggeloo is a hamlet in the Dutch province of Drenthe. It is a part of the municipality of Westerveld, and lies about 17 km north of Hoogeveen.

The hamlet was first mentioned in 1217 as Legghelo. The etymology is unclear. Leggeloo was home to 172 people in 1840.
