= Geeuwenbrug =

- Village
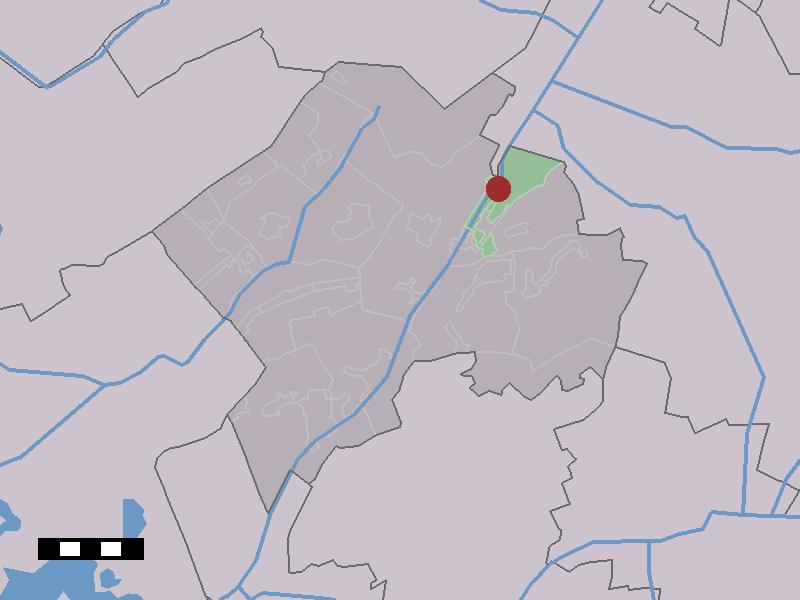
- The village (dark red) and the statistical district (light green) of Geeuwenbrug in the municipality of Westerveld.

- Location in the Netherlands Geeuwenbrug (Netherlands)
- Coordinates: 52°52′22″N 6°22′13″E
- Country: Netherlands
- Province: Drenthe
- Municipality: Westerveld

Area
  - Total: 9.06 km^{2} (3.50 sq mi)
- Elevation: 10 m (33 ft)

Population (2021)
  - Total: 460
  - Density: 51/km^{2} (130/sq mi)
- Time zone: UTC+1 (CET)
  - Summer (DST): UTC+2 (CEST)
- Postal code: 7991
- Dialing code: 0521

Geeuwenbrug is a village in the Dutch province of Drenthe. It is a part of the municipality of Westerveld, and lies about 18 km north of Hoogeveen.

The village was first mentioned in 1617 or 1618 as "die Crumme voerdt offt guijwe", and means bridge over a waterway, and refers to the former river Lake which was used to transport peat. The river was later canalised and became part of the Drentsche Hoofdvaart. The village started to develop along the canal after 1850.

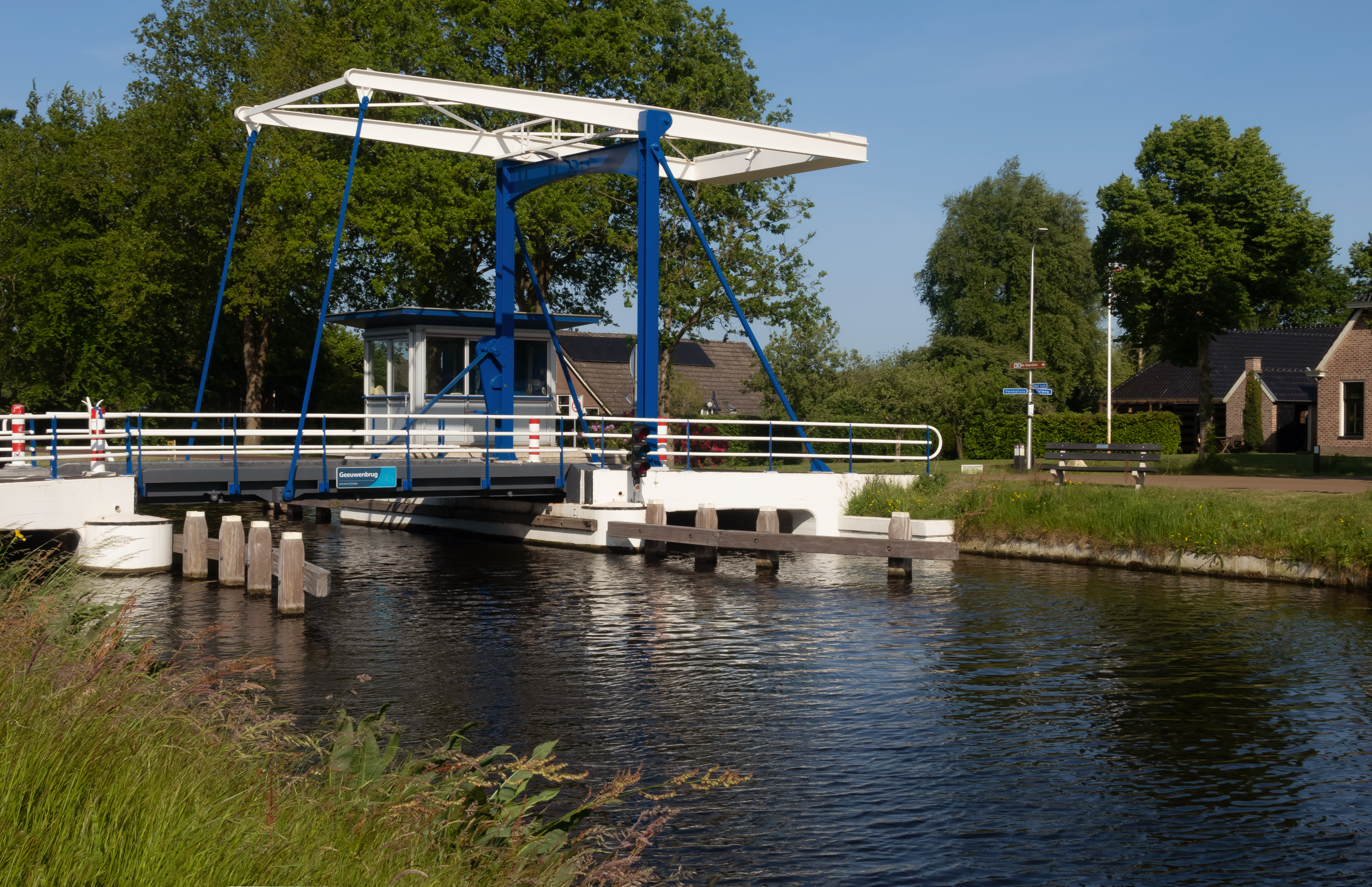
Drawbridge: the Geeuwenbrug in Geeuwenbrug
