= Havelterberg =

- Village
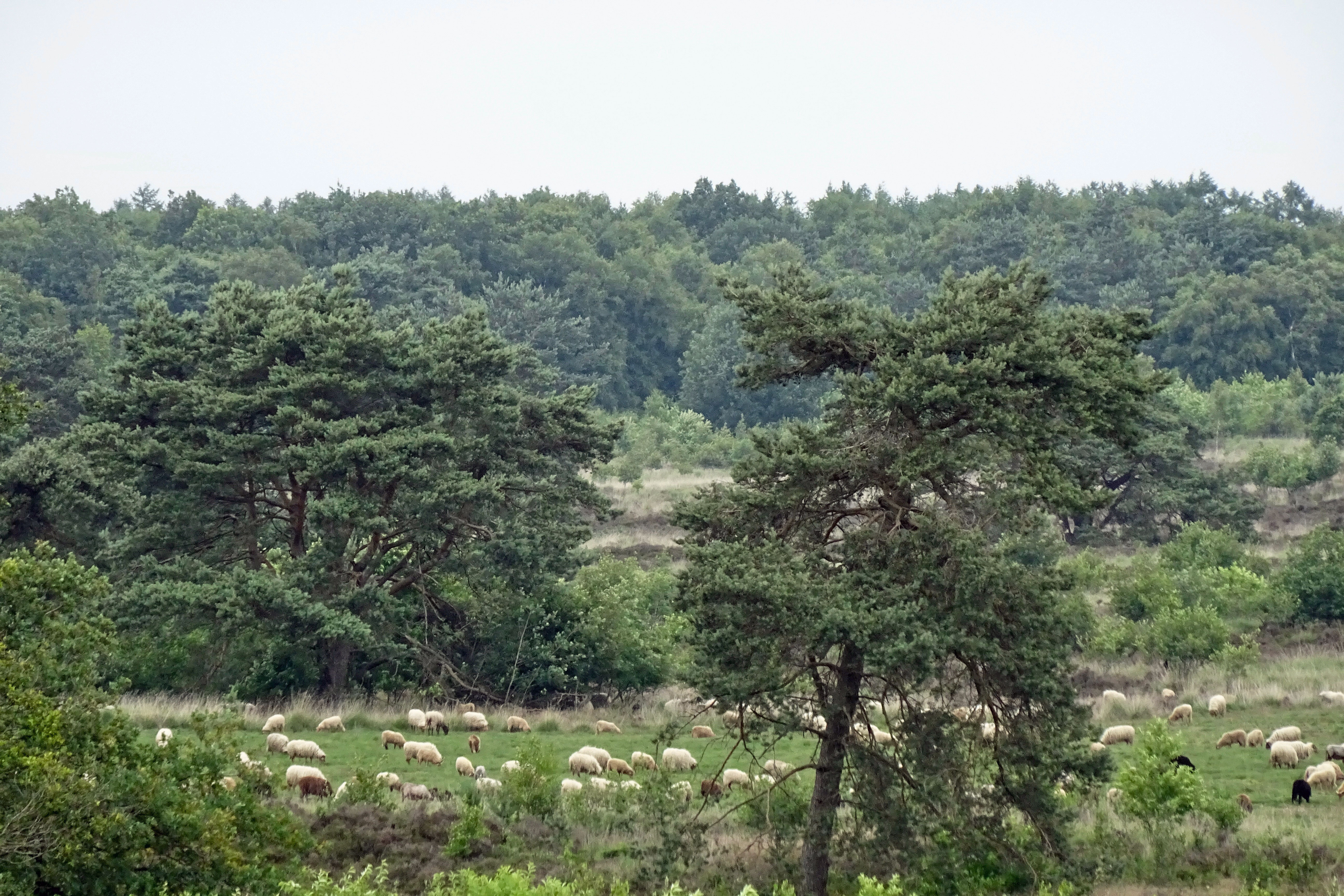
- Landscape near Havelterberg

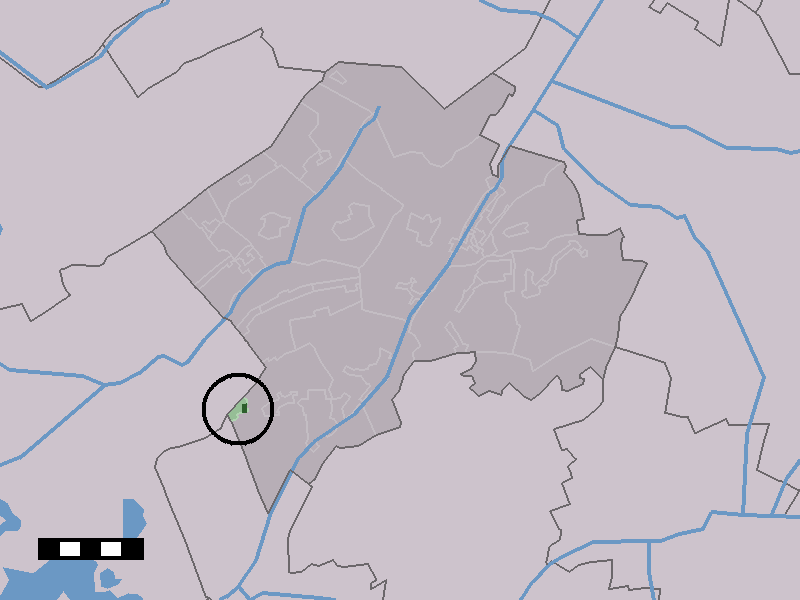
- The town centre (dark green) and the statistical district (light green) of Havelterberg in the municipality of Westerveld.

- Location in the Netherlands Havelterberg (Netherlands)
- Coordinates: 52°46′30″N 6°11′7″E
- Country: Netherlands
- Province: Drenthe
- Municipality: Meppel, Westerveld

Area
  - Total: 0.51 km^{2} (0.20 sq mi)
- Elevation: 11 m (36 ft)

Population (2021)
  - Total: 200
  - Density: 390/km^{2} (1,000/sq mi)
- Time zone: UTC+1 (CET)
  - Summer (DST): UTC+2 (CEST)
- Postal code: 7974
- Dialing code: 0521

Havelterberg is a village in the Dutch province of Drenthe. It lies on the border of the municipalities Meppel and Westerveld, and lies about 21 km west of Hoogeveen.

== History ==
The village was first mentioned in 1844 as Havelterberg, and means "hill belonging to Havelte. The name is used both for the village and the hill. Havelterberg has place name signs.

Between 1964 and 1989, there was an American military base at Havelterberg. It contained munition depot of NATO. Only the watchtower has remained. It used to be the site of frequent anti-nuclear demonstrations, because tactical nuclear weapons were suspected to be present at the base.

== Dolmen ==
There are two hunebedden (dolmen) in Havelterberg. D53 is the second largest dolmen of the Netherlands. It spans nearly 18 metres (59 ft), and contains 9 capstones and 21 side stones. It used to have a beautiful ring of 40 stones. There were still 24 left in 1918 when Albert Egges van Giffen researched the dolmen. Nowadays, there are only 10 left. All the stones have been put back in there place in 1918. The cellar contained the largest amount of artefacts of any dolmen. In 1945, the German authorities wanted to remove the stones, because it was a clear marker for enemy aircraft. Van Giffen persuaded the Germans to bury the stones, and there were placed back in their original position in 1949.

D54 is located nearby and they can almost be considered twins. There are six capstones, however one is missing.

== Gallery ==
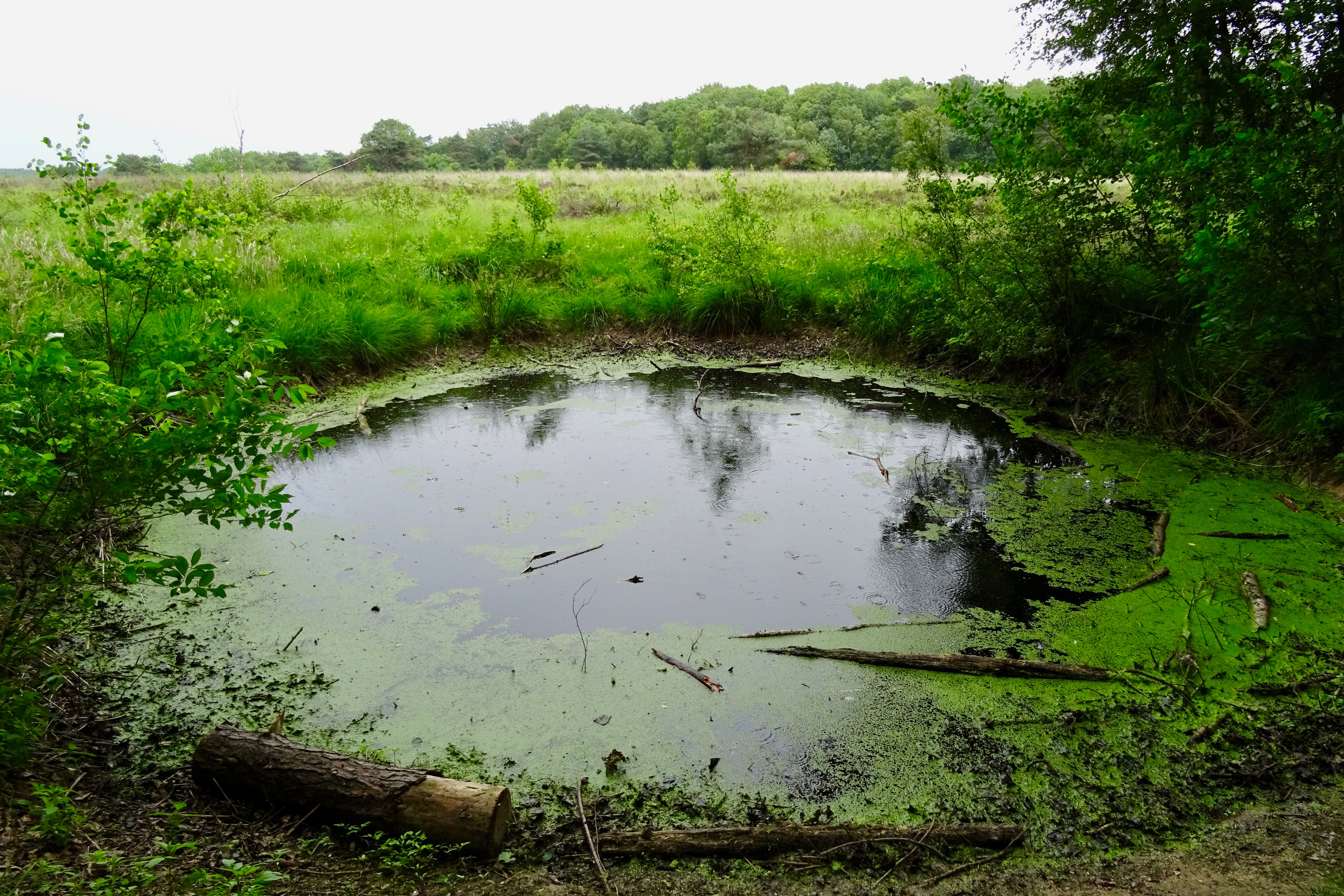
Bomb crater at Havelterberg

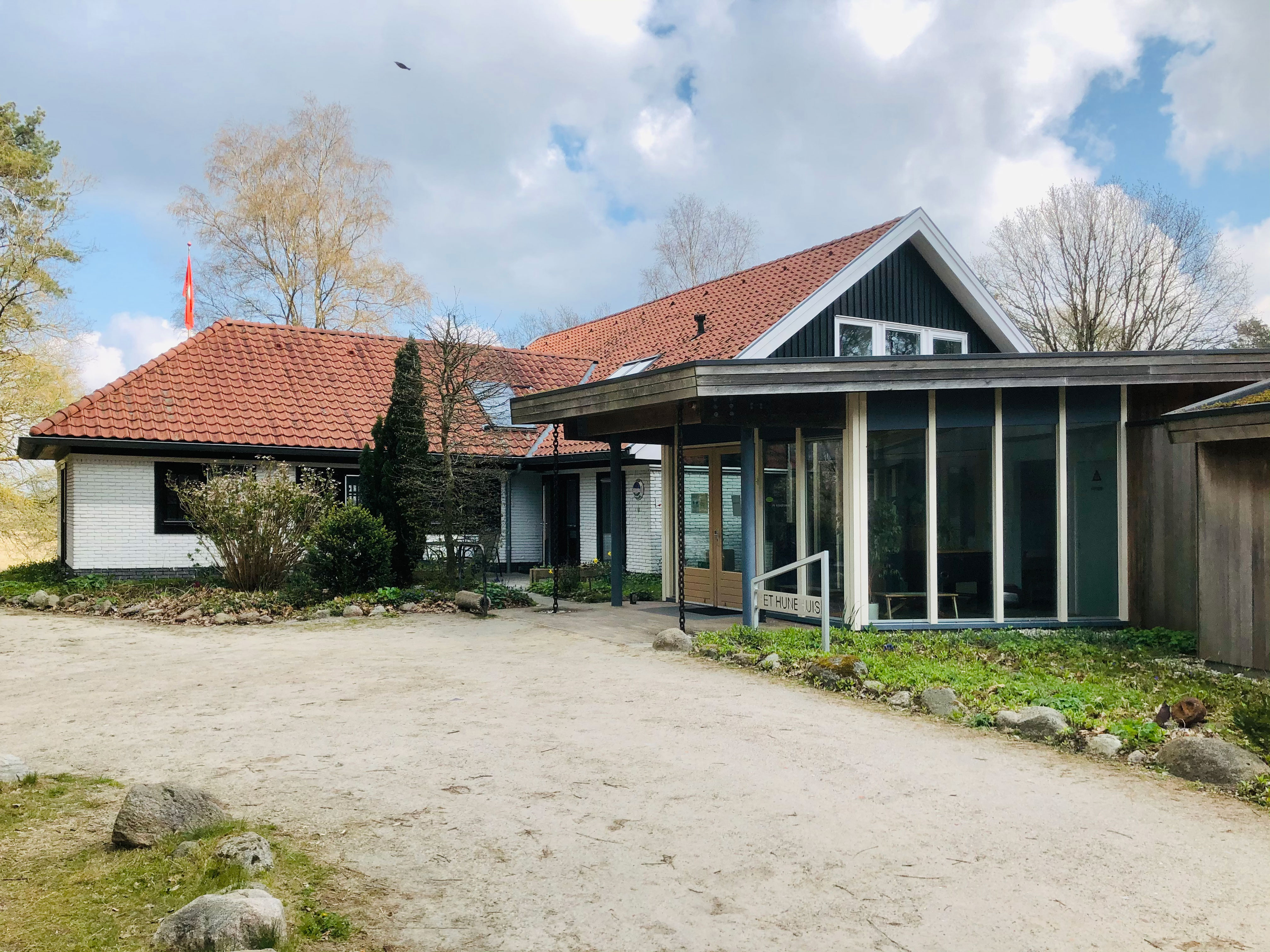
The hunehuis

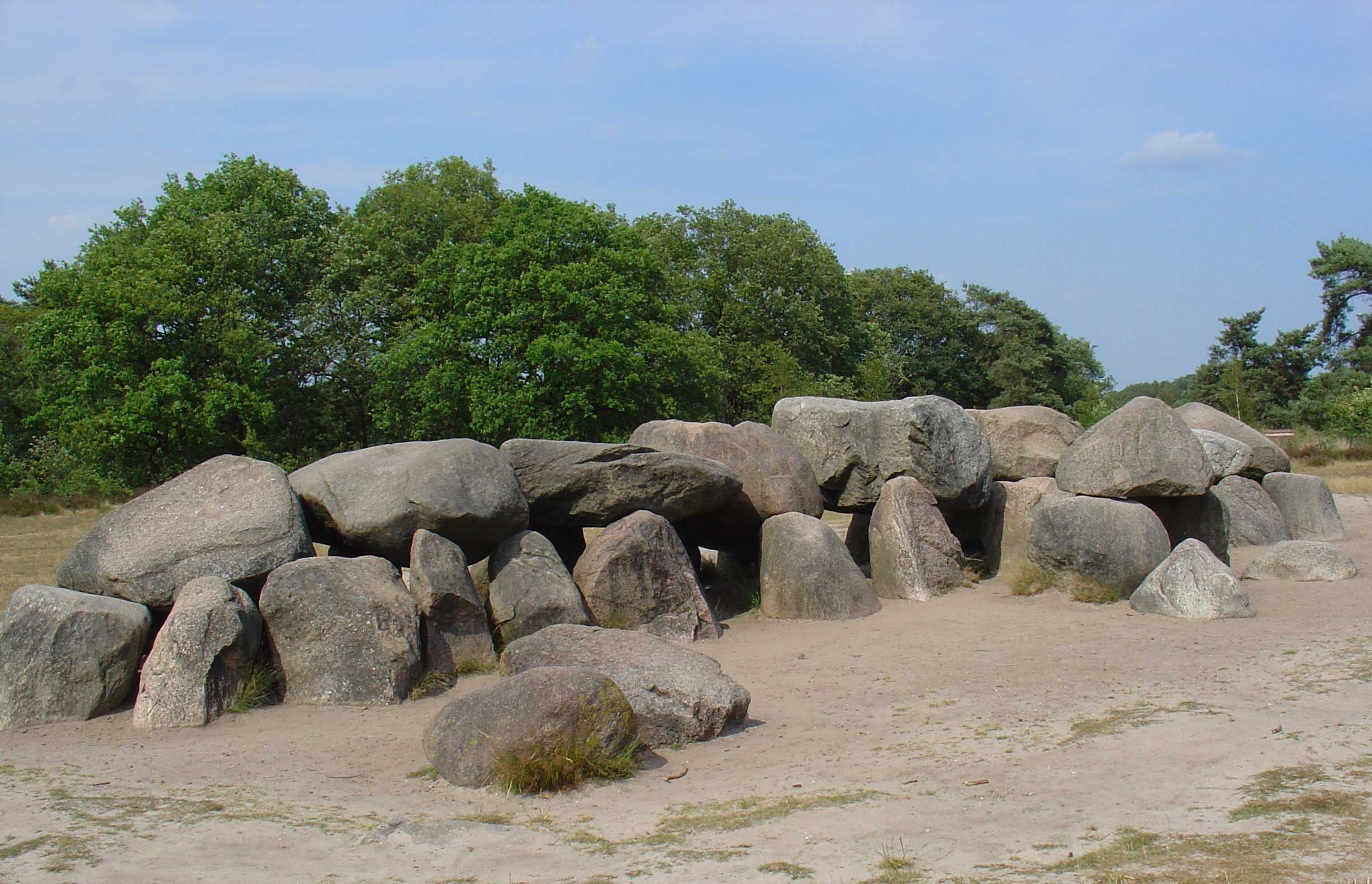
Hunebed (dolmen) D53

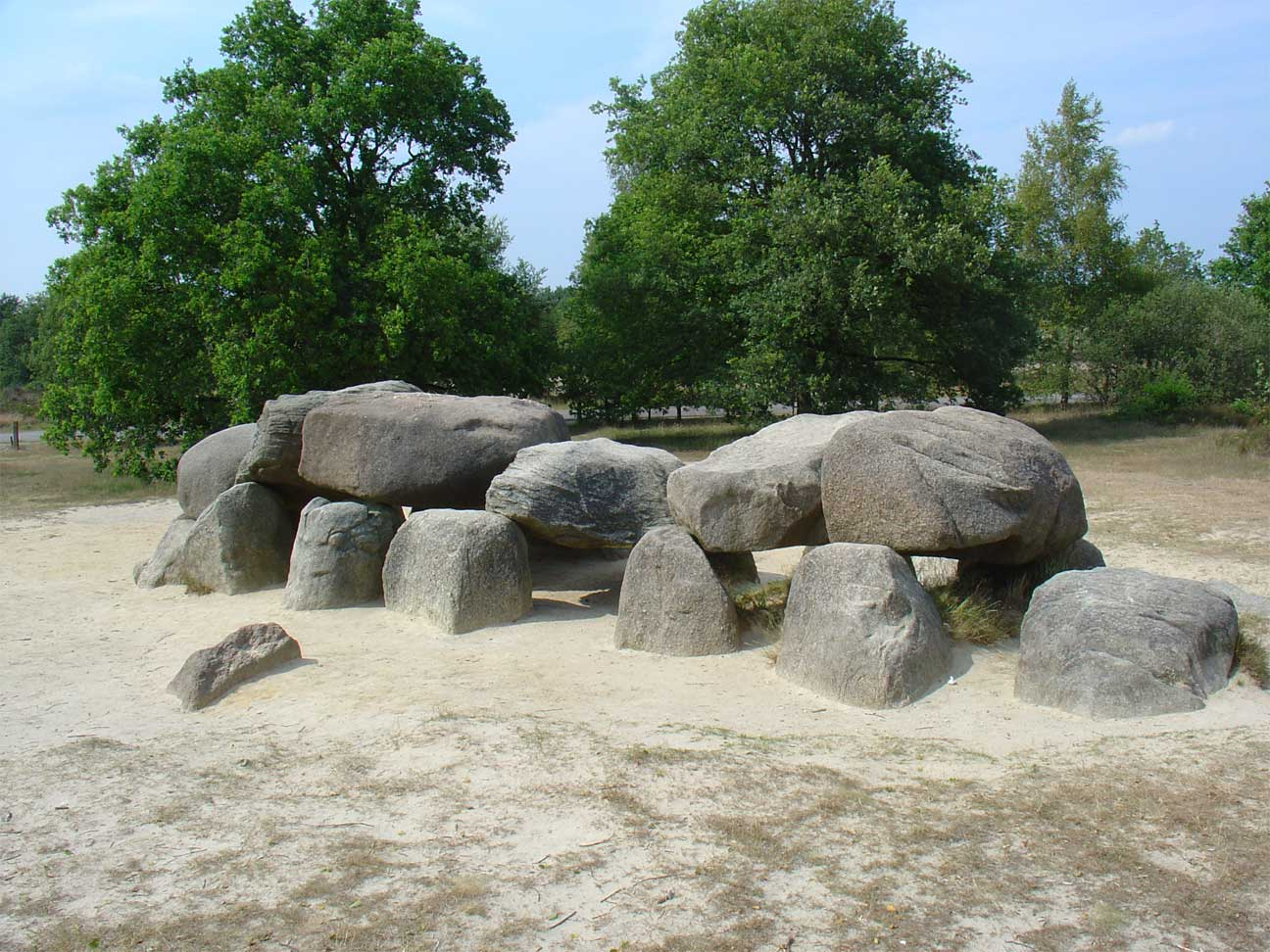
Hunebed (dolmen) D54
