= Wapse =

- Village
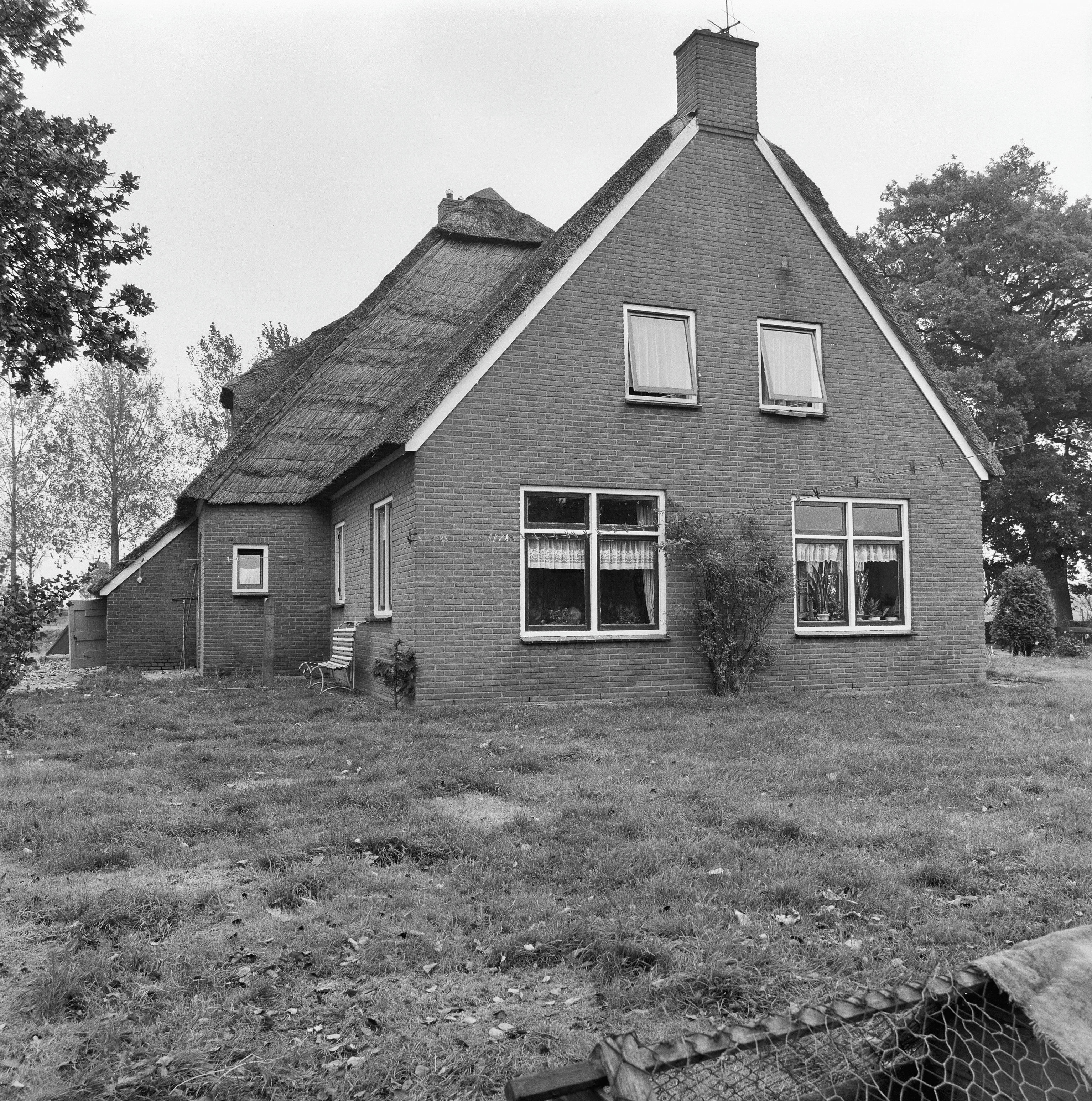
- Farm in Wapse

- Flag Coat of arms

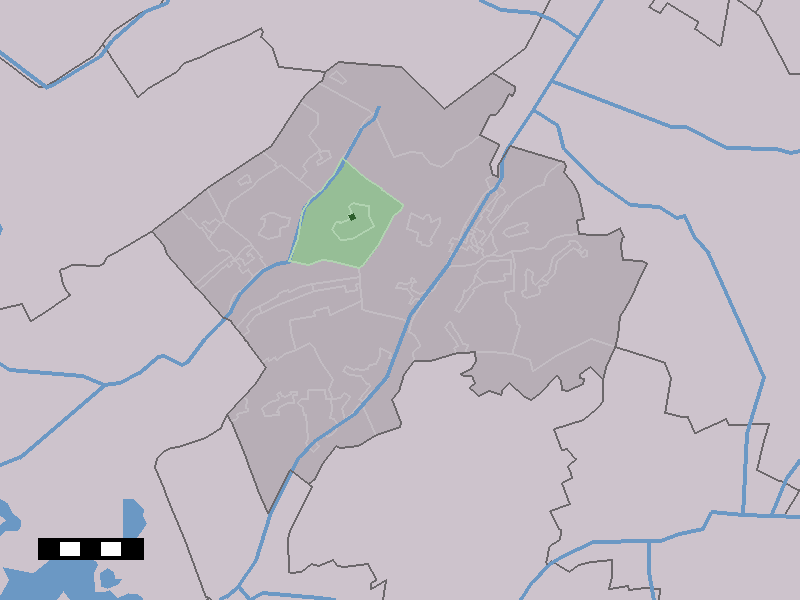
- The village centre (dark green) and the statistical district (light green) of Wapse in the municipality of Westerveld.

- Location in province of Drenthe in the Netherlands Wapse (Netherlands)
- Coordinates: 52°52′N 6°16′E
- Country: Netherlands
- Province: Drenthe
- Municipality: Westerveld

Area
  - Total: 17.17 km^{2} (6.63 sq mi)
- Elevation: 7 m (23 ft)

Population (2021)
  - Total: 655
  - Density: 38.1/km^{2} (98.8/sq mi)
- Time zone: UTC+1 (CET)
  - Summer (DST): UTC+2 (CEST)
- Postal code: 7983
- Dialing code: 0521

Wapse is a village in the Dutch province of Drenthe. It is a part of the municipality of Westerveld, and lies about 21 km northwest of Hoogeveen.

The village was first mentioned in 1384 as "Johanni de Wapse". The etymology is unknown. Wapse is a circular esdorp from the Early Middle Ages. There used to be five hamlets around the central communal pasture.

Wapse was home to 252 people in 1840. In 1897, a cooperative dairy factory was founded in Wapse. In 2016, the village school was scheduled to be closed due to lack of students, however protests have prevented its closure.
