= Lhee =

- Hamlet
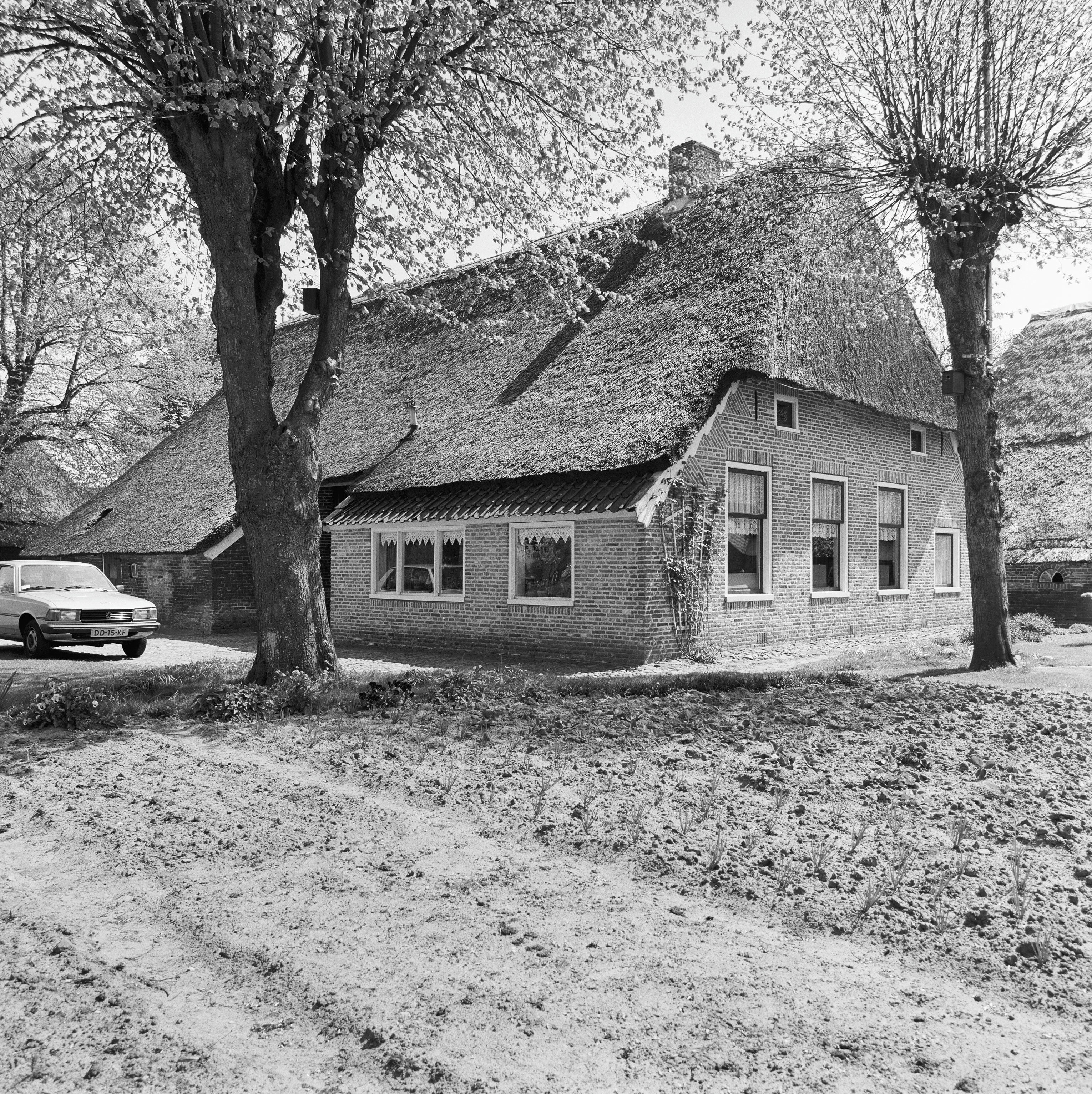
- Farm in Lhee

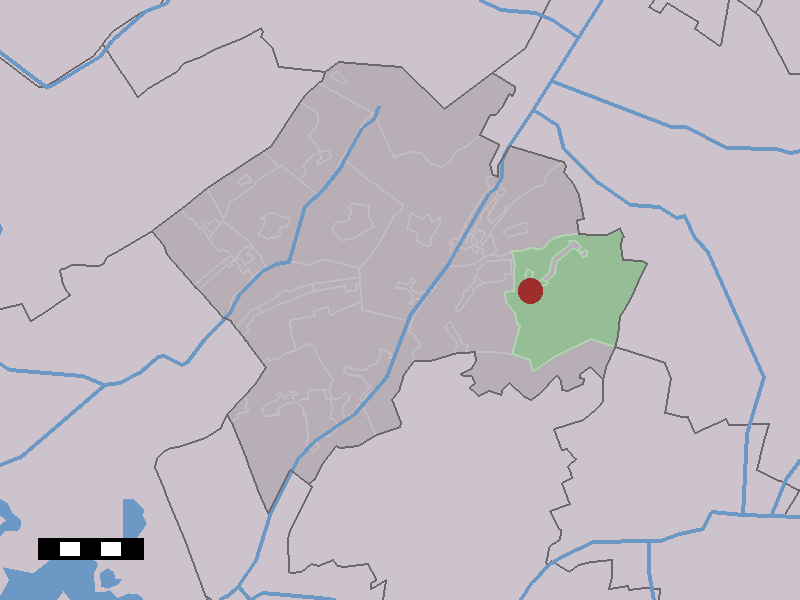
- The village (dark red) and the statistical district (light green) of Lhee in the municipality of Westerveld.

- Location in the Netherlands Lhee (Netherlands)
- Coordinates: 52°49′42″N 6°23′37″E
- Country: Netherlands
- Province: Drenthe
- Municipality: Westerveld

Area
  - Total: 29.99 km^{2} (11.58 sq mi)
- Elevation: 10 m (33 ft)

Population (2021)
  - Total: 385
  - Density: 12.8/km^{2} (33.2/sq mi)
- Time zone: UTC+1 (CET)
  - Summer (DST): UTC+2 (CEST)
- Postal code: 7991
- Dialing code: 0521

Lhee is a hamlet in the Dutch province of Drenthe. It is a part of the municipality of Westerveld, and lies about 13 kilometres (8.1 mi) north of Hoogeveen.

The hamlet was first mentioned in 1181 as "In Lede". The etymology is unclear.

Around 1800, a little school was built in Lhee. In 1953, it was moved brick by brick to the Netherlands Open Air Museum despite protests from the former teacher. Lhee was home to 229 people in 1840.
