= Uffelte =

- Village
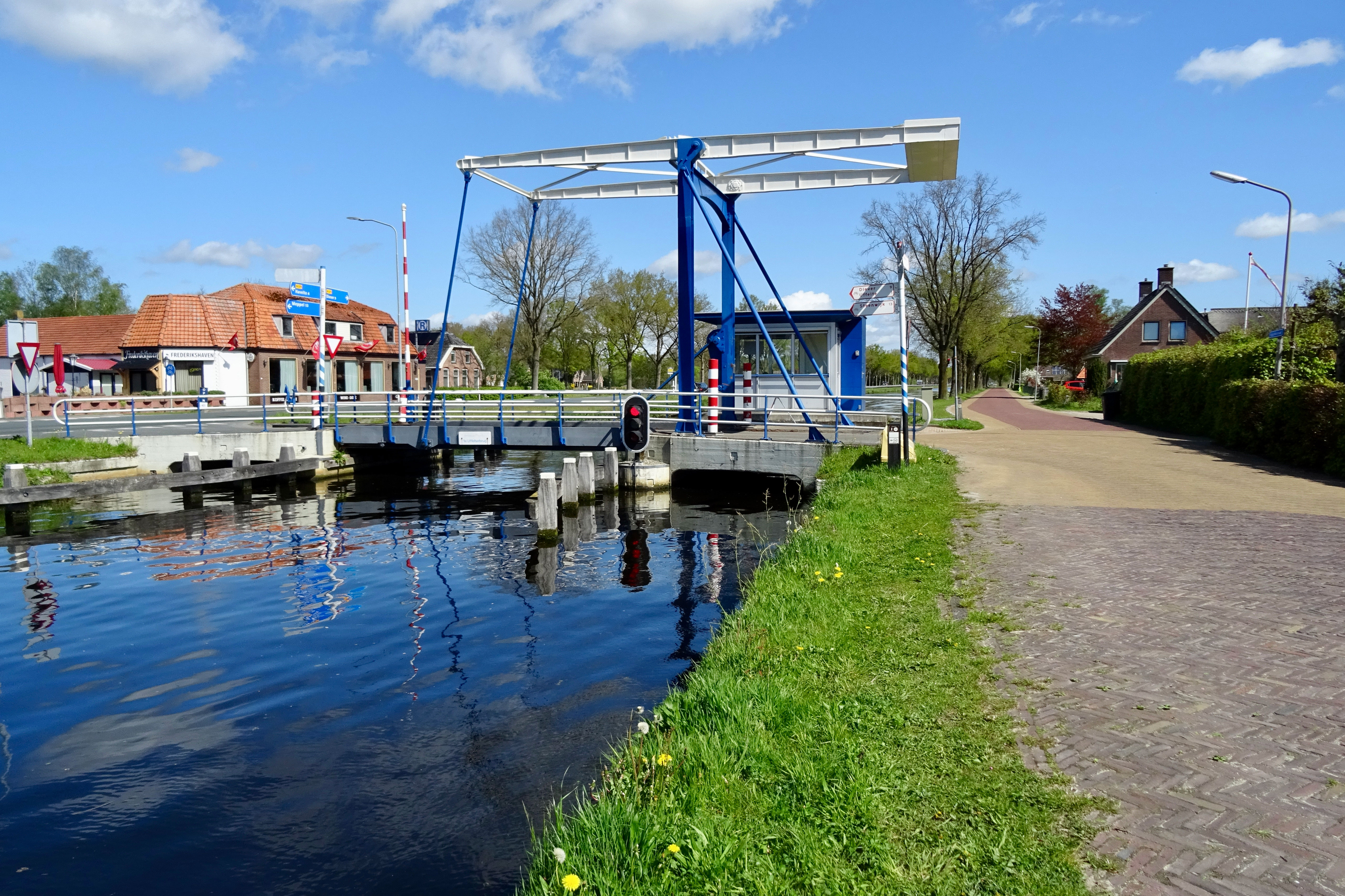
- Bridge near Uffelte

- Flag

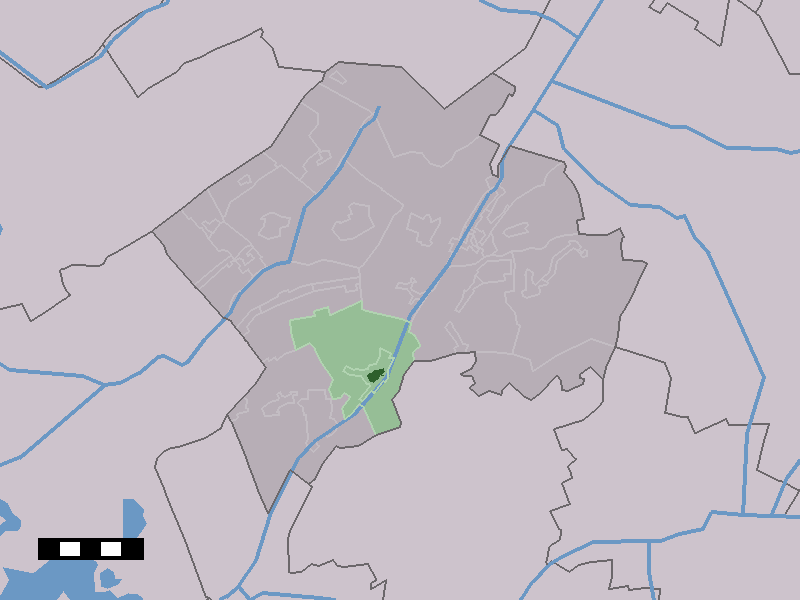
- The village centre (dark green) and the statistical district (light green) of Uffelte in the municipality of Westerveld.

- Location in province of Drenthe in the Netherlands Uffelte (Netherlands)
- Country: Netherlands
- Province: Drenthe
- Municipality: Westerveld

Area
  - Total: 22.52 km^{2} (8.70 sq mi)
- Elevation: 6 m (20 ft)

Population (2021)
  - Total: 1,430
  - Density: 63.5/km^{2} (164/sq mi)
- Time zone: UTC+1 (CET)
  - Summer (DST): UTC+2 (CEST)
- Postal code: 7975
- Dialing code: 0521

Uffelte is a village in the Dutch province of Drenthe. It is a part of the municipality of Westerveld, and lies about 15 km west of Hoogeveen.

Uffelte was first mentioned as Ulfo in 1040 when Emperor Henry III donated estates from a certain Uffo and his brothers, located in Uffelte, Wittelte and Peelo, to Bishop Bernold of Utrecht.Wittelte Uffelte is an esdorp on a sandy ridge. The village has two large communal pastures and a village square.

The villages of Uffelte and Darp decided to build a joint church halfway between the two villages. The church was built in 1310, and the village of Havelte developed around the church. Uffelte received its own church in 1910, when the Dutch Reformed church was built.

Uffelte was home to 651 people in 1840.

== Gallery ==
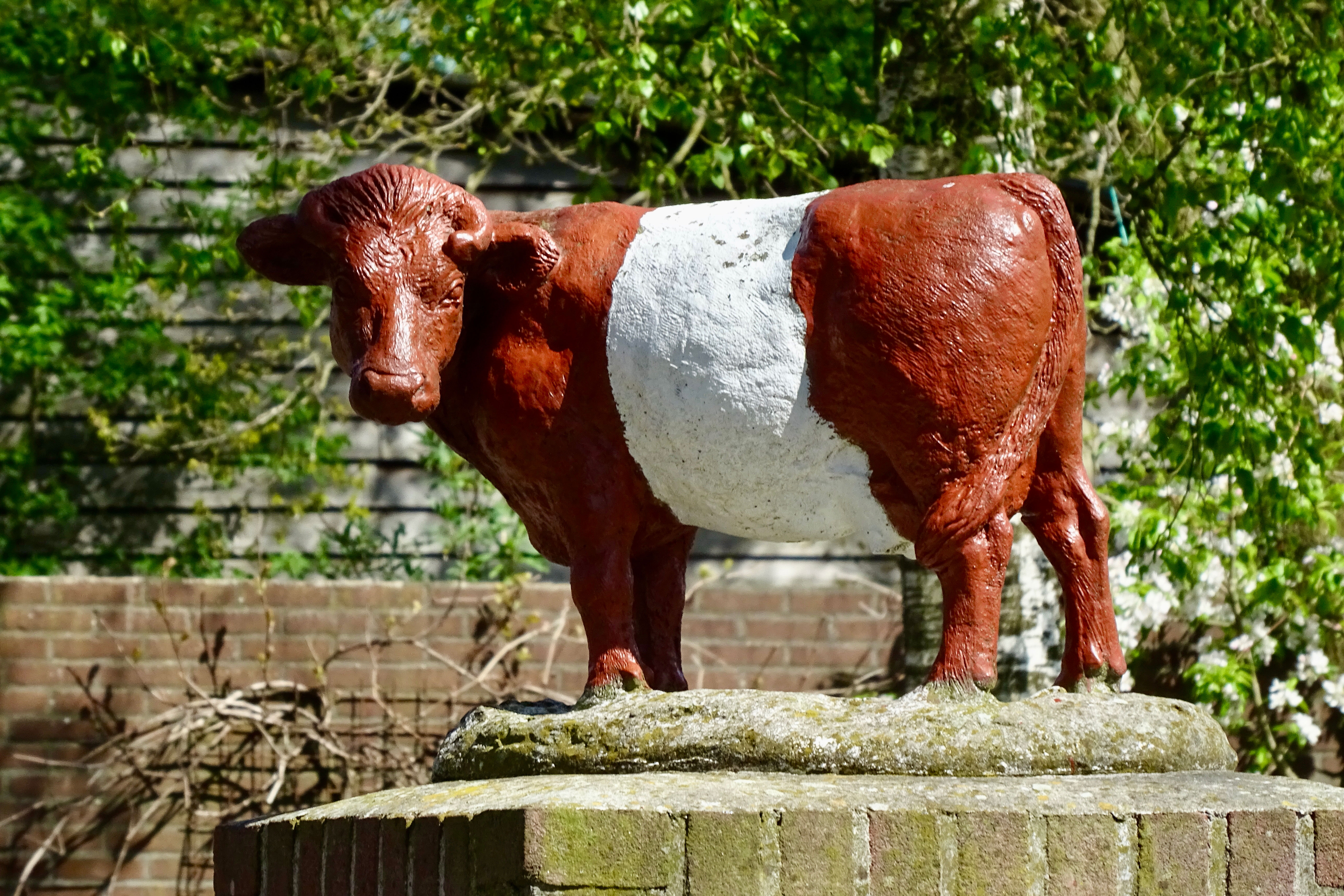
Cow statue

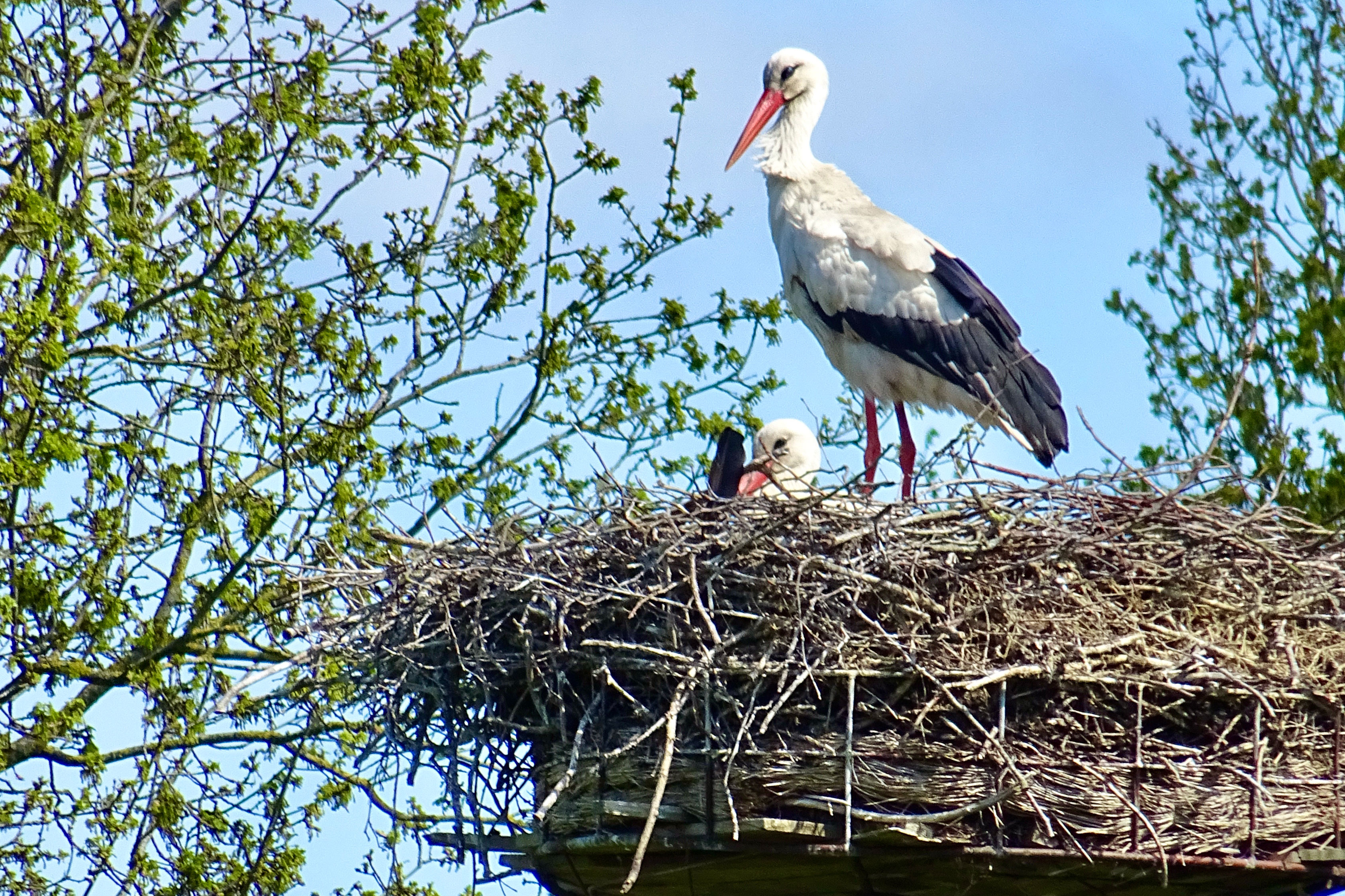
Stork at Uffelte

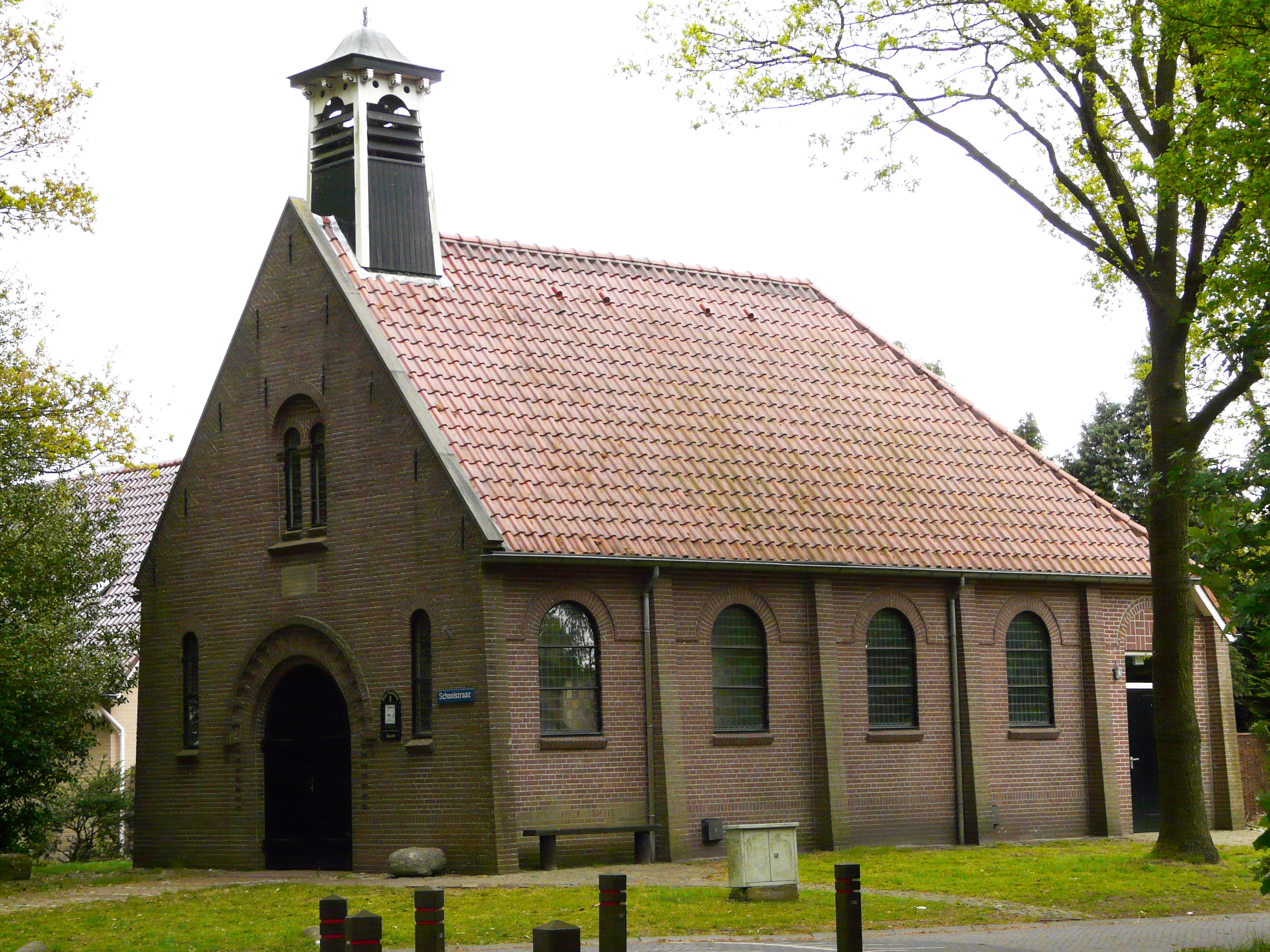
Church of Uffelte
