= Vledderveen, Drenthe =

Vledderveen
- Village
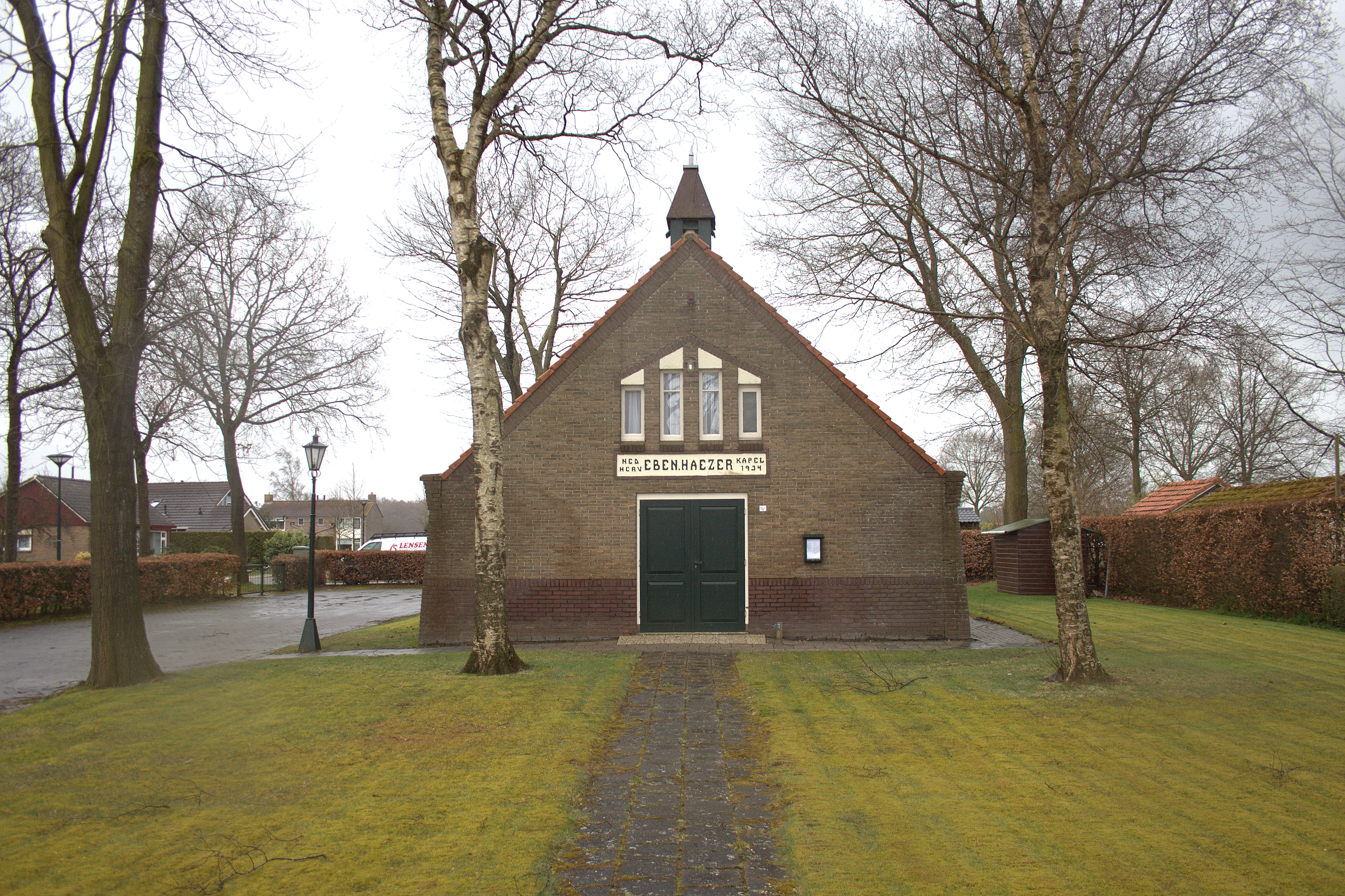
- Church of Vledderveen

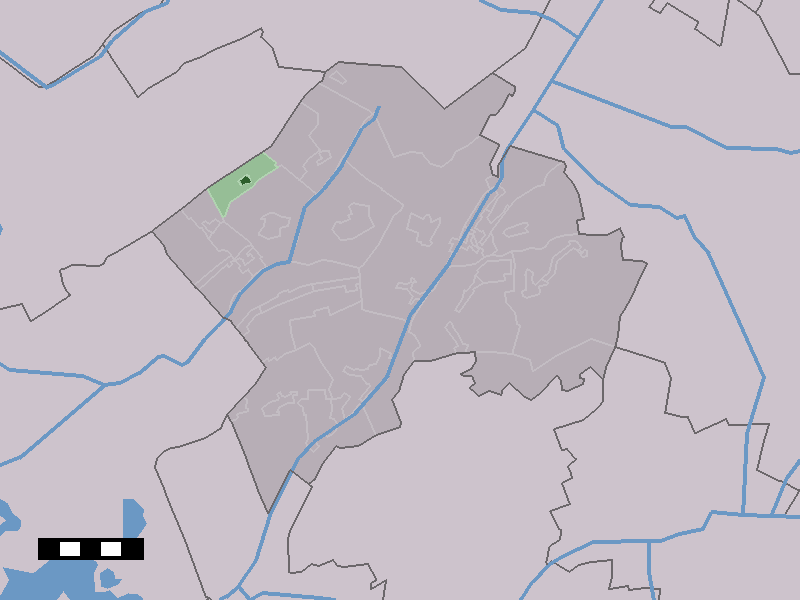
- The village centre (dark green) and the statistical district (light green) of Vledderveen in the municipality of Westerveld.

- Location in province of Drenthe in the Netherlands Vledderveen (Netherlands)
- Coordinates: 52°53′N 6°11′E
- Country: Netherlands
- Province: Drenthe
- Municipality: Westerveld

Area
  - Total: 4.05 km^{2} (1.56 sq mi)
- Elevation: 5 m (16 ft)

Population (2021)
  - Total: 360
  - Density: 89/km^{2} (230/sq mi)
- Time zone: UTC+1 (CET)
  - Summer (DST): UTC+2 (CEST)
- Postal code: 8385
- Dialing code: 0521

Vledderveen is a village in the Dutch province of Drenthe. It is a part of the municipality of Westerveld, and lies about 26 km northwest of Hoogeveen.

The village was first mentioned in 1877 as Vledderveen, and means "peat excavation settlement belonging to Vledder". The excavation started around 1780 by Frisian colonists. The settlement later grew as former colonists from Frederiksoord settled in the village.

Vledderveen was home to 320 people in 1870. In 1891, a little wooden church was built in the village. It was replaced by a stone building in 1934. In 1942, Jewish forced labourers cultivated the heath around Vledderveen. On 2 October 1942, they were sent to Westerbork transit camp. A memorial has been placed in 1986.
