= Zuidveen =

Village in the Netherlands

- Village
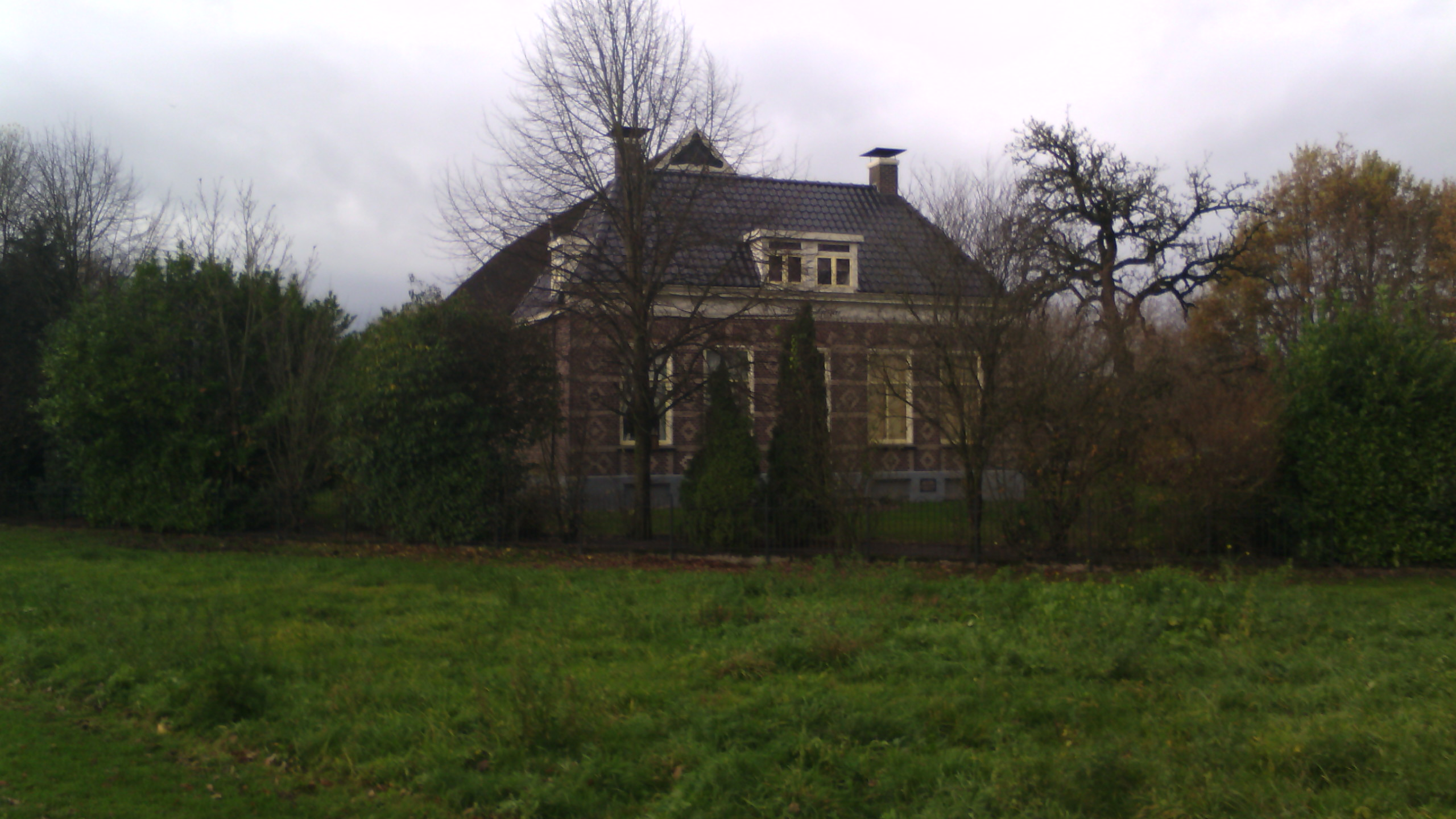
- Farm in Zuidveen

- Location in the Netherlands Zuidveen (Netherlands)
- Coordinates: 52.7762°N 6.1065°E
- Country: Netherlands
- Province: Overijssel
- Municipality: Steenwijkerland

Area
  - Total: 9.59 km^{2} (3.70 sq mi)
- Elevation: 0 m (0 ft)

Population (2021)
  - Total: 600
  - Density: 63/km^{2} (160/sq mi)
- Time zone: UTC+1 (CET)
  - Summer (DST): UTC+2 (CEST)
- Postal code: 8343
- Dialing code: 0521

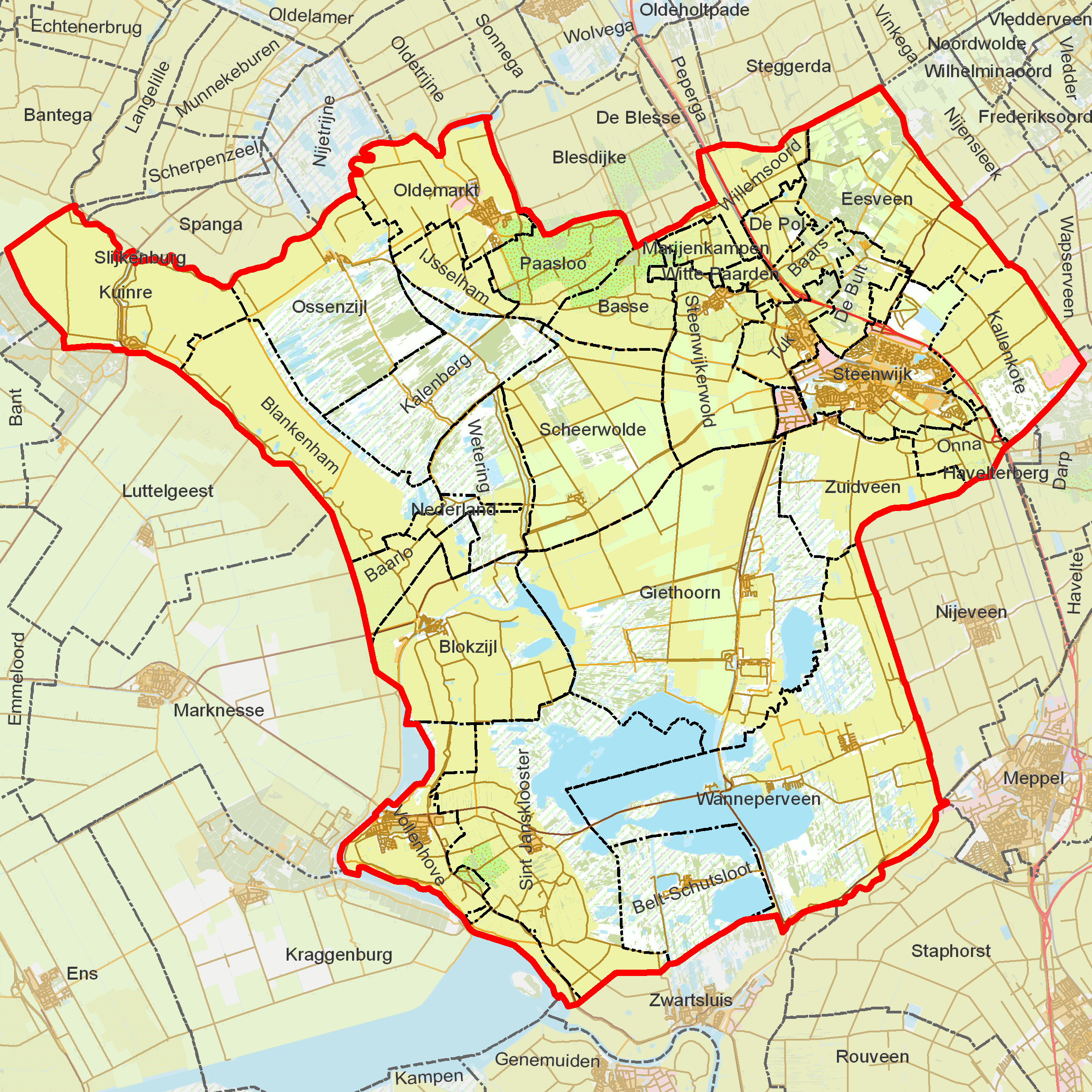
Zuidveen lies just south of the city of Steenwijk in Steenwijkerland.

Zuidveen (Dutch Low Saxon: Zuudvene) is a Dutch village just south of Steenwijk in the municipality of Steenwijkerland. It forms a single urban area with Steenwijk.

== Location ==
Zuidveen is located in the northwest of Overijssel province, along provincial road N333, called Zuidveenseweg where it passes the village. A grassland east of Zuidveen, De Kamp, is composed of boulder clay which reaches up to six metres above mean sea level and is considered to be of geological interest. Zuidveen lies just north of a nature reserve which is part of De Weerribben-Wieden National Park.

== Beginnings ==
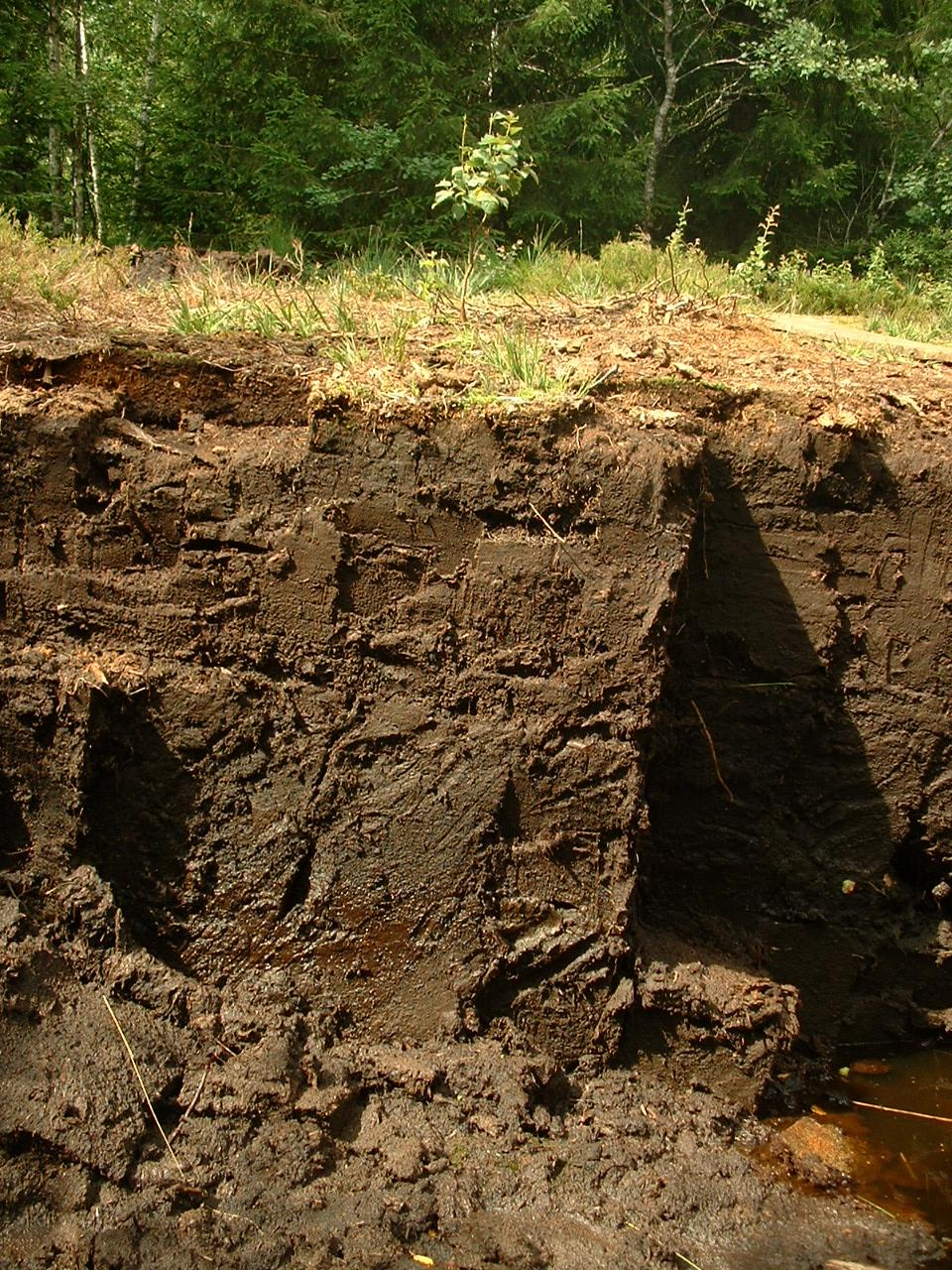
Peat cutting was an important economic activity in Zuidveen for centuries.

Settlement of the present-day area of Zuidveen began with the arrival of peat cutters, probably in the High Middle Ages. They encountered a swampy heath. The name Zuidveen, which means south fen, is first recorded in a deed from 1386 in which Johannes Altboem donates two roeden of land 'in Zuytvene' to St. Clemens church in Steenwijk; this likely concerns a peat fen. In 1460, a deed from the Bishopric of Utrecht – the legal entity that governed the territory – amplifying the city boundaries of Steenwijk mentions 'Zuetvene'.

The first settlers lived alongside a ditch called the Dwarssloot. When the work in the peat fens moved a little distance, their dwellings, which were simple constructions, would be moved along. This way, the settlement came to be located along the Langesloot.

In 1675 the hamlet had a population of about a hundred; in 1795 there were around five hundred inhabitants and in 1840 there were nearly a thousand. The number had shrunk to 590 by 1890 mostly as a result of declining employment in the peat fens; it has since remained fairly stable. Some of those who left in the 19th century went up to Friesland to work in the fens there; others left for North America.

== Peat cutting ==
In 1795, 38% of employed Zuidveen inhabitants worked in agriculture; 25% were artisans and 10% were peat workers. In 1832, the percentages were 40%, 9% and 28%, respectively. Some of the traditional professions included mat weaving and besom making.

Around 1550, Frisian Mennonites and other colonists joined the peat workers. As the fens began to be exploited on a large scale for the first time and the population grew, it became necessary to demarcate the areas each participant was entitled to work in.

=== Canals and windmills ===
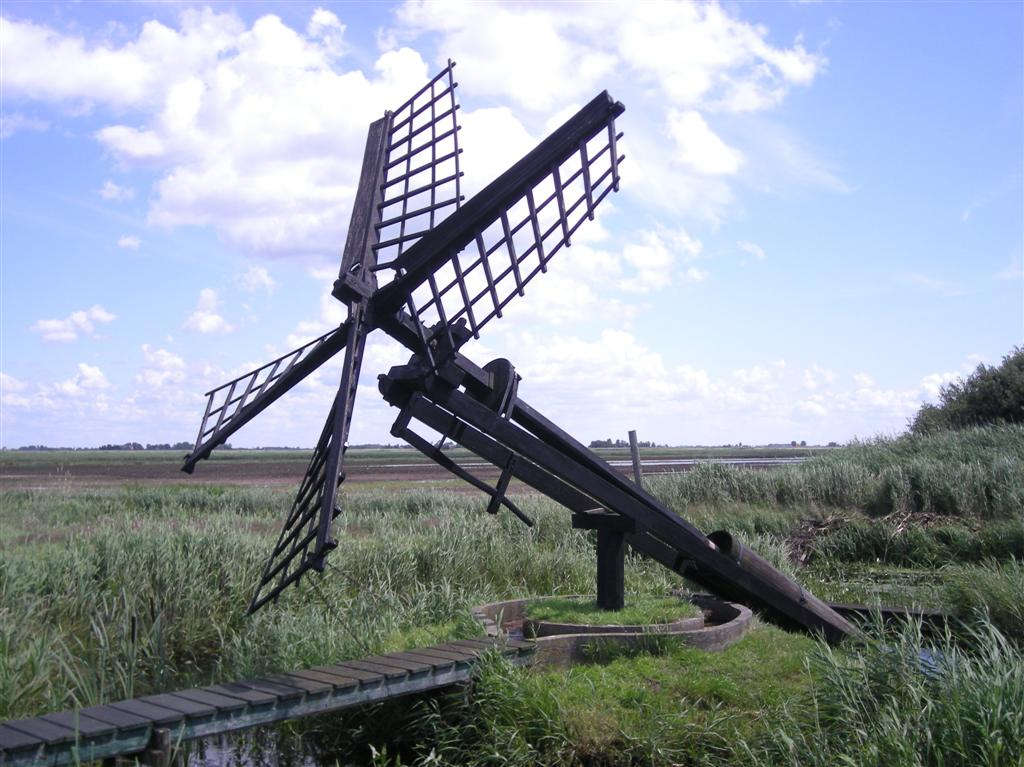
Windmills of the paaltjasker type, such as the one pictured here, were used to drain the Zuidveen fens from the mid-19th century on. American-style windpumps were used later.

In order to extract peat, fens had to be drained. Many drainage channels and ditches were dug in and around Zuidveen. Such canals still characterize the landscape of northwest Overijssel. The Zuidveense Aa or Olde Aa ran through Zuidveen; it was navigated with punts and rafts.

In the second half of the 18th century, windmills were built to assist in drainage efforts. The oldest windmill of Zuidveen was the Hogewaeterensmeule; the best known one was the polder mill of Trienen Peters. The last of northwest Overijssel's polder mills, it was moved to Wapenveld in the Veluwe in 1955.

=== Decline ===
The scale of peat cutting around Zuidveen declined from the second half of the 18th century, as peat fens became smaller and more land was converted to agricultural use. The last peat to be cut was in the Broekslagen, the present-day business park Groot Verlaat. Zuidveen resident Meine Veen (married 1920) was billed as the last turfmeter, or peat measurer, in the province of Overijssel. He was responsible for collecting taxes on peat for the water board. With the disappearance of peat, the canals and ditches lost their function of drainage and transportation channels, and were sometimes filled in. The Olde Aa in Zuidveen, once an important transportation channel, was largely filled in 1949-50, and the bridges which had had a social meeting function disappeared with it.

== Education ==
Zuidveen has had a primary school for at least four hundred years. The first teacher known from the archive is Peter Peters, mentioned in 1611. The schoolmaster was appointed and paid for by the parish (the karspel), whose board was made up of yeoman farmers and landowners living elsewhere. The oldest school building was likely a wooden one; later ones were brick buildings with a thatched roof. Throughout the centuries, the school building functioned as a meeting place where business transactions were done and public proclamations were read. The present-day school building dates from 1988.

When primary school reform was enacted in 1985, the primary school in Zuidveen failed to conform to the new norm of a minimum of 26 pupils. The problem was solved by closure of the school in the next-door village of Onna, so the children living in Onna went to school in Zuidveen again just like they used to in the 17th and 18th centuries.

== Religion ==
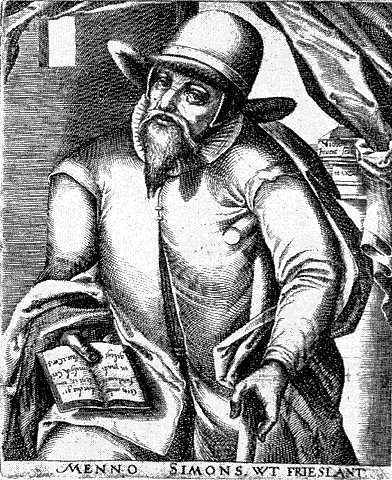
Menno Simons (1496-1561) from Friesland was an Anabaptist leader whose followers established congregations in villages like Zuidveen.

Zuidveen's religious make-up in 1808 was 76% reformed, 15% Mennonite and 9% Roman Catholic.

=== The Mennonite community ===
The founding of the Mennonite church in Zuidveen around 1560 has been attributed to Leenaert (or Leendert) Bouwens, an elder appointed by Anabaptist leader Menno Simons. It is more likely, however, that the neighbouring Giethoorn-Noord congregation was the mother church of Zuidveen, which became independent after a number of Giethoorn members had settled in Zuidveen. The Mennonite community in northwest Overijssel grew fast with the arrival of Frisian peat workers.

In the 17th and 18th centuries, the Zuidveen congregation were Danzig Old Flemish Mennonites. A building on the Langesloot indicated on cadastral maps may have been the congregation's first vermaning, or house of worship. Around 1600, the Mennonites in Zuidveen and Steenwijk were harassed by the reformed magistrates of Steenwijk. In 1774, a split occurred between more conservative and more progressive Mennonite factions in Zuidveen, and a new vermaning was built on the Langesloot called Het Nieuwe Huis (The New House). The smaller faction, which consisted of only three families, kept congregating at Het Oude Huis (The Old House). They held to the old principles and continued to practice footwashing. The Old House was taken over by the Giethoorn-Noord congregation in 1819 who also took the three remaining members under their wing. A storm surge in 1825 destroyed the building.

The New House was fitted with an organ in 1806. It was demolished in 1848, when Zuidveen's congregation was subsumed into that of Steenwijk, where a new vermaning was built which stands to this day. Its pulpit, elders' benches and organ stem from Zuidveen, as does a brick carrying the inscription "IMMANUEL Ao 1630", thought to have been part of the first vermaning on the Langesloot.

== Disasters ==
A large fire which started in a barn consumed 31 houses in Zuidveen in 1779. The event gave rise to the expression, current in Zuidveen and Steenwijk, "Wedden om een hallefien, Sevene staot in de braand" (Want to bet a hallefien [a coin unit], Zuidveen is on fire).

In February 1825 the village was affected by a flood which claimed over three hundred lives in the province of Overijssel. Epidemics in the wake of the flood further increased the death toll.

== Dairy cooperative de Eensgezindheid ==
Between 1897 and 1926 Zuidveen had its own dairy factory for churning butter and producing cheese. In the preceding era, farmers had had to churn butter on their own farms. A number of farmers had their own horse-powered churning mill. Butter from Zuidveen was mostly sold in Steenwijk.

The dairy factory, built by J.R. Frank from Tuk, had a separator operated by one employee and a churn operated by a team of two. In 1900 the farmers of Zuidveen united in cooperative de Eensgezindheid, which from then on ran the factory. Under the last director, about forty farmers were members of the cooperative, which also had a number of unaffiliated suppliers. The factory steadily lost business in the nineteen-twenties and was closed in 1926, business being taken over by the cooperative Ons Belang in Tuk. The last part of the old dairy was torn down in 1975. Today, the milk is collected from farmers by tank trucks.

== The omnibus of de Ziele ==
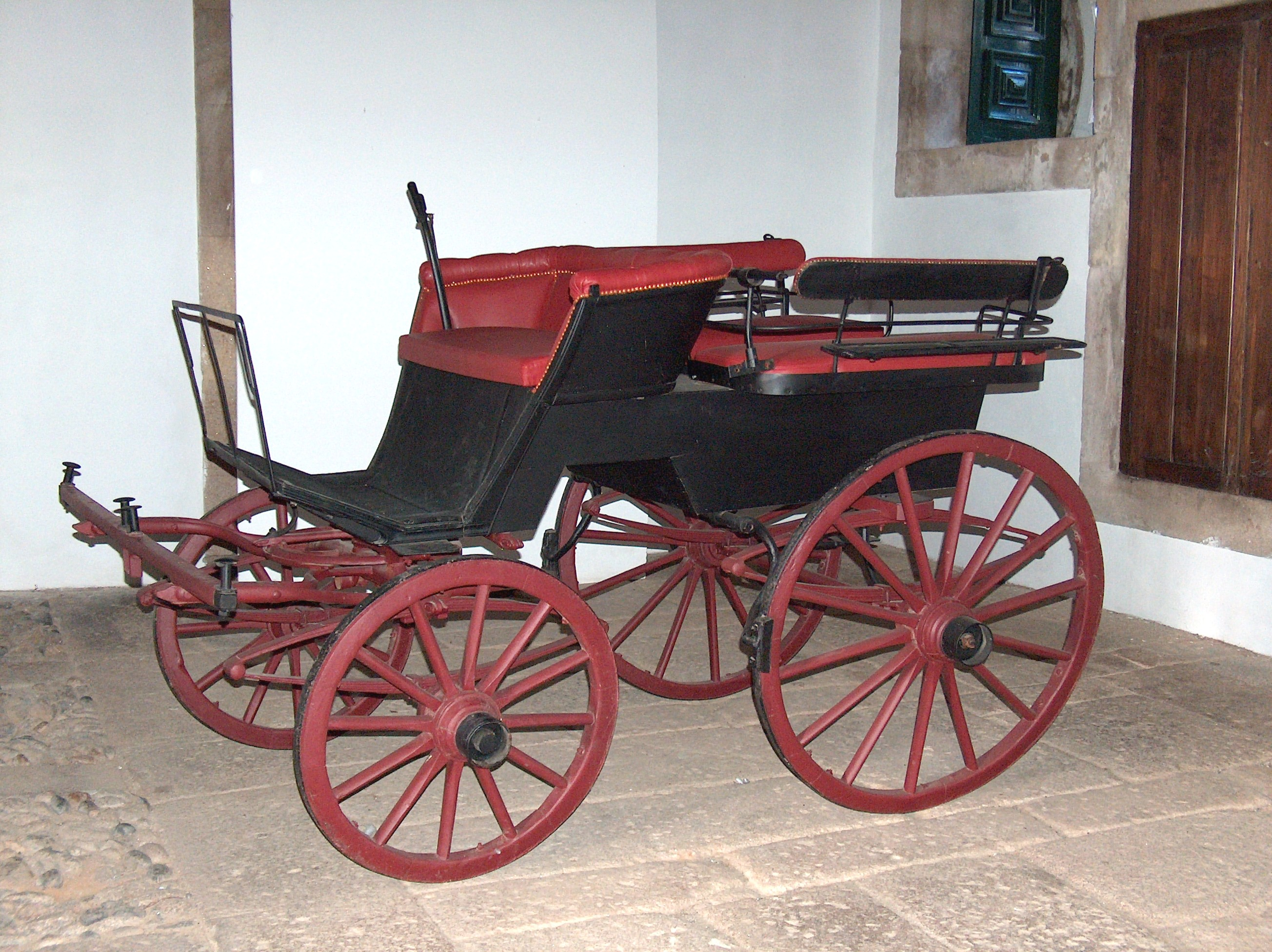
The wagonette was the first form of public transportation in northwest Overijssel.

The first entrepreneur to organize public transportation in the Kop van Overijssel was Jan Zijlstra, originally from Oldelamer and living in Zuidveen. In 1904 Zijlstra, nicknamed de Ziele, began operating a horse-drawn wagonette, or omnibus, between Steenwijk and Giethoorn that seated twenty persons. A second wagonette rode between Steenwijk and Meppel twice a week. The wagonettes were also used for recreational trips and school trips.

After 1918 passenger numbers declined sharply, due amongst other reasons to the popularization of the bicycle. Some years later Zijlstra ended his transportation business and dedicated himself to raising livestock instead.

== Language ==
The language spoken in Zuidveen alongside standard Dutch is the Stellingwarfs variety of Dutch Low Saxon. Linguist Harrie Scholtmeijer calls it Noord-Overijssels; speakers usually call it plat, dialect or Zuudvenegers. It stands out for its vowel sound [ɛː] in many words, spelled ae in Stellingwarfs and pronounced like the è in French père. This characteristic gave rise to the shibboleth Et waeter klaetert teugen de glaezen dat er daevert (The water splashes noisily against the windows).

Zuudvenegers also has features in common with West Frisian, such as the [sk] sound (skoele, Fr. skuolle, school) and the elision of the consonant in the definite article following a preposition (op 'e taofel, Fr. op 'e tafel, on the table).

As an example of Zuudvenegers, an extract from Toone Kamp's poem Woarom mag i'j neet mit eur noar Sevene goan (Why can't he go to Zuidveen with her):

Janna's moder hef wat	Janna's mother has something
teug'n Janna's skat,	against Janna's darling,
woarom dat?	why is that?
[...]	[...]
Woarom mag i'j neet mit eur	Why can't they both
an de deure stoan,	stand at the door,
waorom mag i'j neet mit eur	why can't they both
noar Sevene goan,	go to Zuidveen,
woarom mag i'j neet mit eur	why can't they both
mit eur aantien in zien haand	with her little hand in his hand
noar de enties kiek'n an de waeterkaant	look at the ducklings on the waterfront
woarom mag i'j neet mit eur	why can't they both
noar de steerens zien	look at the stars
en een smokkien geem'n of een zoegertien?	and give a peck or a love bite?
[...]	[...]
