= Marijenkampen =

- Hamlet
- Location in the Netherlands Marijenkampen (Netherlands)
- Coordinates: 52.8134°N 6.0599°E
- Country: Netherlands
- Province: Overijssel
- Municipality: Steenwijkerland

Area
  - Total: 1.96 km^{2} (0.76 sq mi)
- Elevation: 6 m (20 ft)

Population (2021)
  - Total: 170
  - Density: 87/km^{2} (220/sq mi)
- Time zone: UTC+1 (CET)
  - Summer (DST): UTC+2 (CEST)
- Postal code: 8339
- Dialing code: 0521

Marijenkampen is a hamlet in Steenwijkerland, a municipality in the province Overijssel in the Netherlands. Until 1867, the area was called Huttenberg and was overgrown with heath. The first inhabitants were people who had been banned from the neighbouring colony Willemsoord, founded by the Society of Humanitarianism. These inhabitants settled in and led an independent life. The village was named after Marij van Essen who owned several lots of land in the area.
