= Steenwijkerland =

Steenwijkerland Stienwiekerlaand (Dutch Low Saxon)
- Municipality
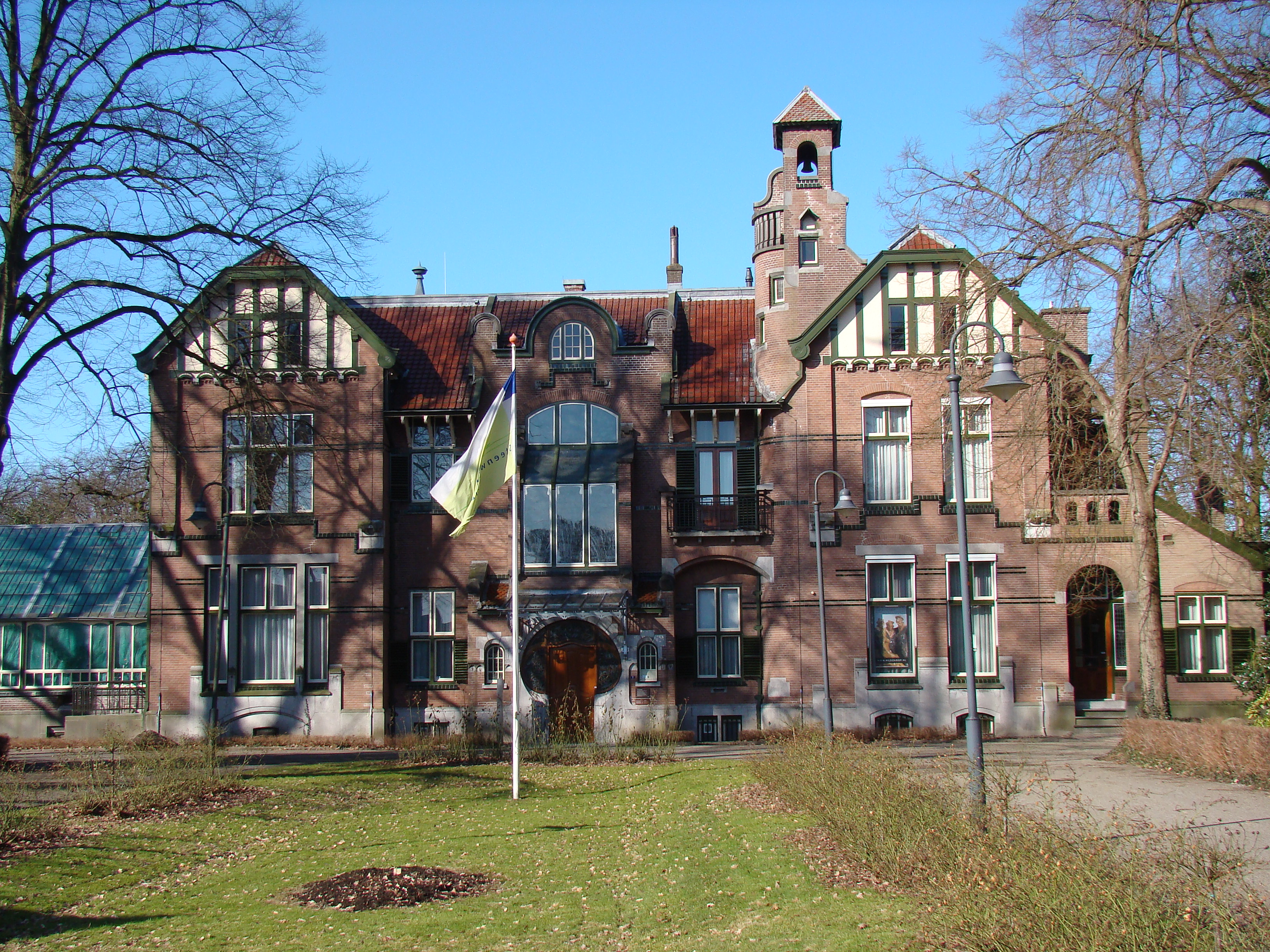
- Monumental house in Steenwijk

- Flag Coat of arms

- Location in Overijssel
- Coordinates: 52°47′N 6°7′E
- Country: Netherlands
- Province: Overijssel
- Established: 1 January 2001
- Renamed: 1 January 2003

Government
  - Body: Municipal council
  - Mayor: Erik de Groot

Area
  - Total: 321.59 km^{2} (124.17 sq mi)
  - Land: 288.27 km^{2} (111.30 sq mi)
  - Water: 33.32 km^{2} (12.86 sq mi)
- Elevation: 5 m (16 ft)

Population (January 2021)
  - Total: 44,341
  - Density: 154/km^{2} (400/sq mi)
- Time zone: UTC+1 (CET)
  - Summer (DST): UTC+2 (CEST)
- Postcode: Parts of 7000 and 8000 ranges
- Area code: Various
- Website: www.steenwijkerland.nl

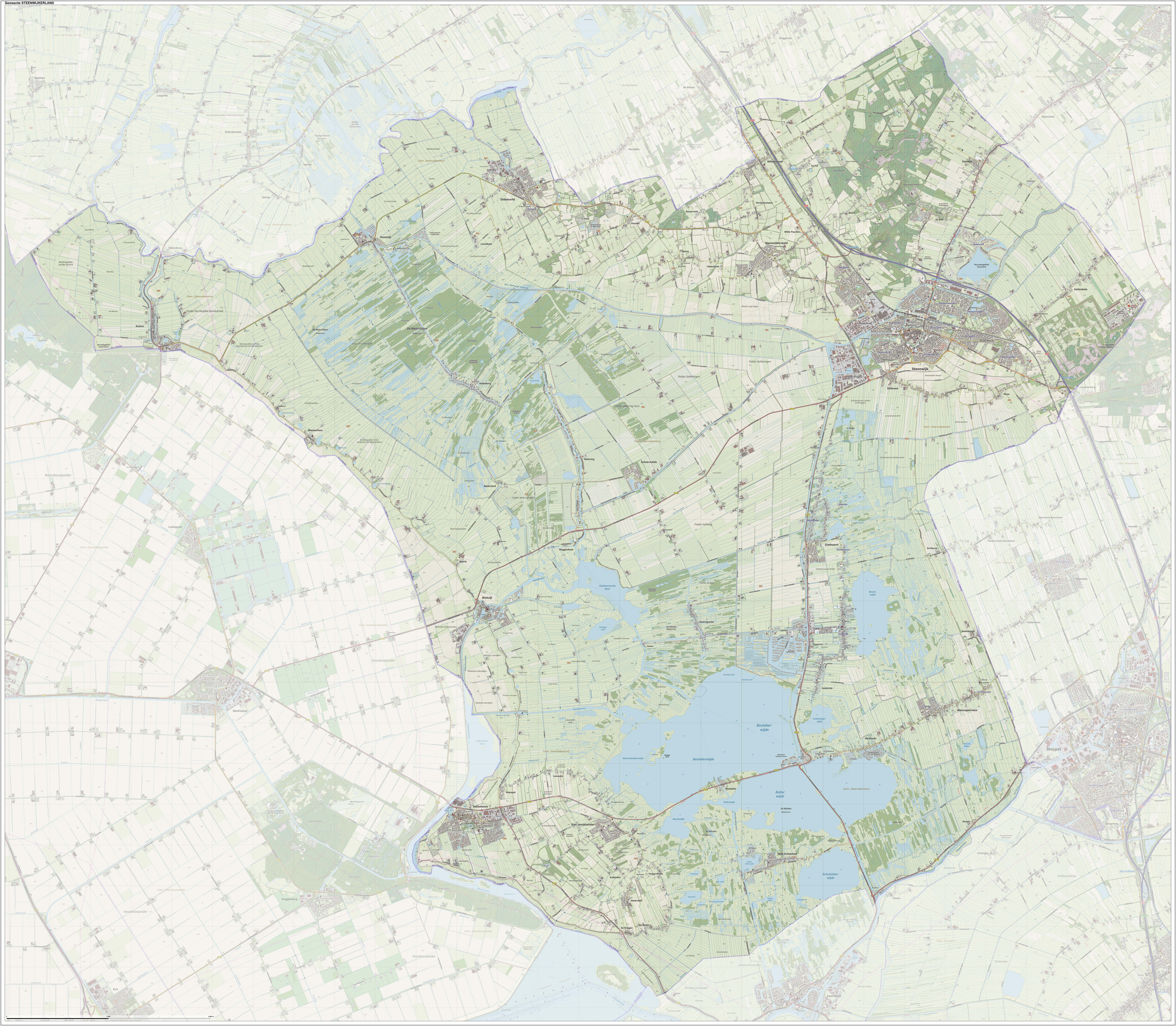
Dutch Topographic map of Steenwijkerland, June 2015

Steenwijkerland (Dutch: [steːɱˌʋɛikərˈlɑnt]; Dutch Low Saxon: Stienwiekerlaand or Steenwiekerlaand) is a municipality in the province of Overijssel, in the eastern Netherlands. Prior to a name change in 2003, it was known as Steenwijk.

The municipality forms the entire northwesterly corner of the province. This area is called "the Head of Overijssel" (in Dutch: de Kop van Overijssel). It borders the province Friesland. The seat of the municipality, Steenwijk, with a population of about 17,100, is situated on the A32 motorway (Zwolle – Meppel – Leeuwarden) and has a railway station on the line connecting those same cities.

== Economy ==
Steenwijk is the economic and administrative centre of the region. Many smaller trading and industrial enterprises are housed here, as well as a hospital and some secondary schools.

Vollenhove has a shipyard, where very exclusive yachts are built.

All over the area, partially being below sea level, the soil is somewhat swampy. Many Steenwijkerland farmers only raise cattle. The soil is too wet to grow corn or wheat. However, the wetlands also have an advantage: many nature- or water sports-loving tourists come to the municipality.

== Population centres ==
The larger places are printed in bold type.

- Baarlo
- Baars
- Barsbeek
- Basse
- Belt-Schutsloot
- Blauwe Hand
- **Blokzijl**
- De Bult
- De Klosse
- De Kolk
- De Pol
- Doosje
- Dwarsgracht – like Nederland and Muggenbeet, a small village much like Giethoorn, however more remote
- Eesveen
- **Giethoorn**
- Heetveld
- Kadoelen
- Kalenberg
- Kallenkote
- Kuinre
- Leeuwte
- Marijenkampen
- Moespot
- Muggenbeet
- Nederland, Overijssel
- **Oldemarkt**
- Onna, Overijssel
- Ossenzijl
- Paasloo
- Roekebosch
- Ronduite
- Scheerwolde
- **Sint Jansklooster**
- **Steenwijk**
- **Steenwijkerwold**
- Tuk – like Zuidveen now a suburb of Steenwijk
- **Vollenhove**
- **Wanneperveen**
- Wetering
- Willemsoord
- Witte Paarden
- Zuidveen

== Sights ==
- The city of Steenwijk can be visited for daily shopping, going to the market, etc.
- In Steenwijk the villa "Ramswoerthe", built in 1899 in Jugendstil architecture, and its park can be visited.
- Blokzijl has a small marina, surrounded by picturesque old brick houses from the 17th century, looking like miniatures of the Amsterdam canal houses.
- Vollenhove has two remarkable old churches (15th and 17th century), the castle ruins of Toutenburg with a park, the estate Old Ruitenborgh (18th century; small hotel with a good restaurant) and several old houses, of which the former Latin School (17th century) is the most beautiful.
- Giethoorn and Dwarsgracht are picturesque due to their local structure (see above); many of the old farmhouses have been transformed into "second homes" where rich Dutchmen live during their holidays. In summer, most houses of the village are lit in the evening, which enables the Tourist Board to organise romantic guided boat tours. Of course, a yacht-basin, restaurants and camping sites are there as well.
- Between Kuinre and Steenwijk lies the National Park "De Weerribben", a very valuable wetland area with bogs, swamps, small canals and meadows. It can be visited on guided tours. The entrance is in Ossenzijl. For information ask the VVV (Tourist Board) or the owner, the "Natuurmonumenten" organization (on their website, type under: Zoeken ( = Search) the name of the area).
- A similar natural reserve called "De Wieden" is situated in the southern part of the municipality. An information centre is situated in St. Jansklooster near Vollenhove. "Wieden" means: wide places, wide lakes. These lakes are suitable for sailing, windsurfing etc.

== Notable people ==
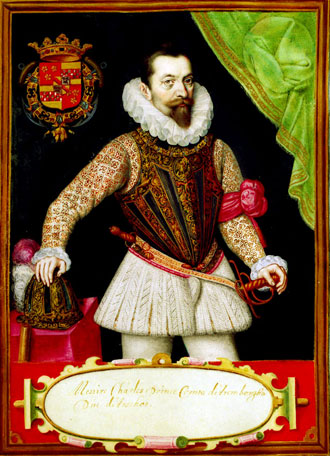
Charles DArenberg

- Georg Schenck van Toutenburg (1480–1540) Stadhouder of Friesland (1521-1540) and Stadholder of Overijssel, Drenthe and Groningen
- Frederik V Schenck van Toutenburg (ca.1503–1580) the first Archbishop of Utrecht 1559-1580
- Charles de Ligne, 2nd Prince of Arenberg (1550–1616) a leading aristocrat, a courtier, soldier, minister and diplomat
- Hildo Krop (1884–1970) a Dutch sculptor and furniture designer
- Herman Nieweg (1932–1999) a Dutch sculptor and ceramist
- Sophie in 't Veld (born 1963) a Dutch politician and Member of the European Parliament
- Dino Bouterse (born 1972) drug smuggler

=== Sport ===
- Wim de Bois (1896–1975) a former Dutch football manager and player
- Kees Kist (born 1952) a retired football striker with 472 club caps
- Marti ten Kate (born 1958) a retired long-distance runner
- Patrick Roest (born 1995) a Dutch professional long track speed skater, silver medallist at the 2018 Winter Olympics
