= Willemsoord =

Willemsoord (not to be confused with the Willemsorde or Military William Order) is the name of two locations in the Netherlands:

- Willemsoord, Steenwijkerland, a village in Steenwijkerland municipality in Overijssel
- Willemsoord, Den Helder, a naval wharf in Den Helder
