= Scheerwolde =

- Village
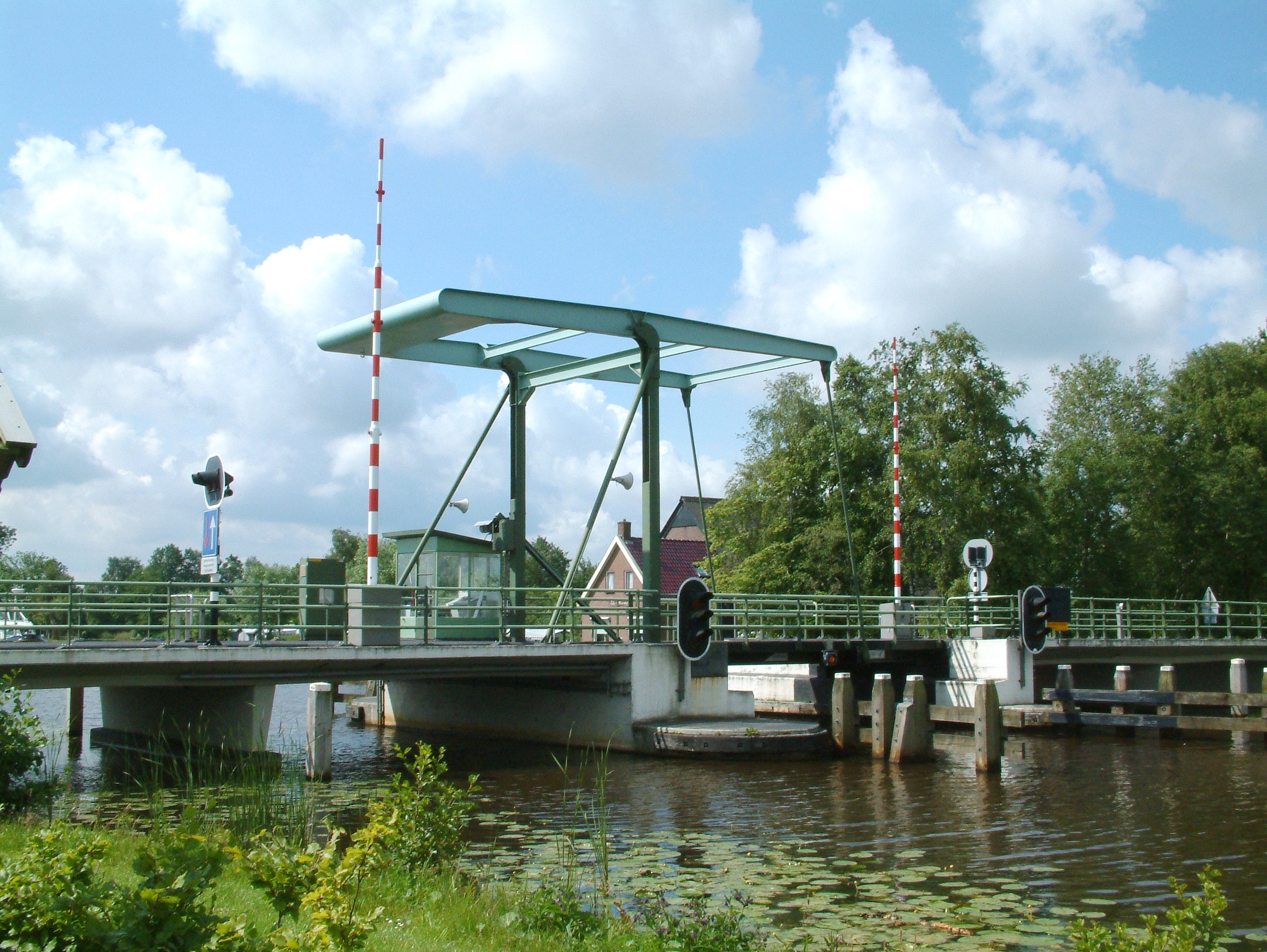
- The Scheerebrug near Scheerwolde

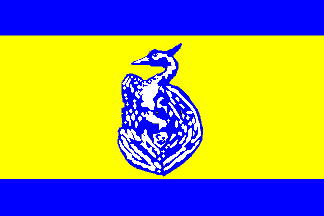
- Flag

- Location in the province of Overijssel in the Netherlands Scheerwolde (Netherlands)
- Coordinates: 52.75627°N 6.01472°E
- Country: Netherlands
- Province: Overijssel
- Municipality: Steenwijkerland

Area
  - Total: 17.07 km^{2} (6.59 sq mi)
  - Land: 16.53 km^{2} (6.38 sq mi)
  - Water: 0.54 km^{2} (0.21 sq mi)
- Elevation: −1.2 m (−3.9 ft)

Population (2023)
  - Total: 620
  - Density: 38/km^{2} (97/sq mi)
- Time zone: UTC+1 (CET)
  - Summer (DST): UTC+2 (CEST)
- Postcode: 8371
- Area code: 0521

Scheerwolde is a village in the municipality of Steenwijkerland in the province of Overijssel in the Netherlands. As of 2023, Scheerwolde had a population of 620. The village is not far northeast from Blokzijl, near the provincial road N333 between Marknesse and Steenwijk. The village is located on the Steenwijkerdiep, between the nature reserves De Weerribben and De Wieden.

== History ==
Scheerwolde is a relatively new village, as it only came into being in 1952. It is located in a reclaimed part of the Weerribben-Wieden. After peat excavations, part of the area was reclaimed again. The land became water and water became land again, after which a new village emerged.

== Notable people ==
- Saskia de Jonge, swimmer (born 1986)
