= Tuk, Netherlands =

Tuk
- Village
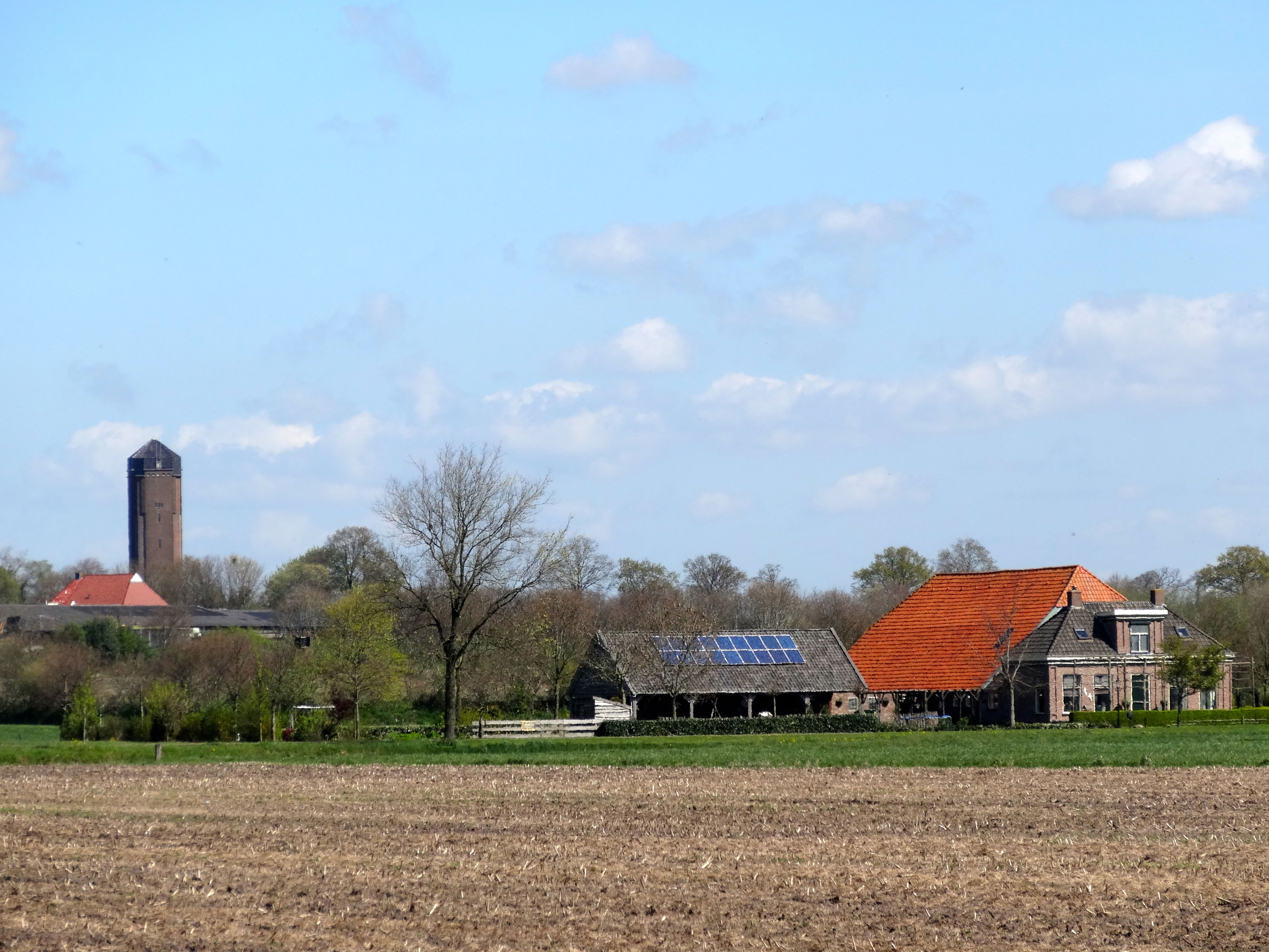
- A view of Tuk

- Location in the Netherlands Tuk (Netherlands)
- Coordinates: 52.7959°N 6.0931°E
- Country: Netherlands
- Province: Overijssel
- Municipality: Steenwijkerland

Area
  - Total: 3.94 km^{2} (1.52 sq mi)
- Elevation: 4 m (13 ft)

Population (2021)
  - Total: 2,170
  - Density: 551/km^{2} (1,430/sq mi)
- Time zone: UTC+1 (CET)
  - Summer (DST): UTC+2 (CEST)
- Postal code: 8334
- Dialing code: 0521

Tuk (Dutch pronunciation: [tʏk]) is a village in the municipality of Steenwijkerland in the province Overijssel, Netherlands. It forms a single urban area with Steenwijk

== History ==
The village was first mentioned in the 14th century. The etymology is unclear. Tuk was located on the main road from Friesland to the south, and travellers often stayed in the village, because the city gates of Steenwijk were closed at night. In the 15th century, a chapel was constructed in the village.

During the Dutch Revolt, the village was severely damaged in the 1580-1581 and 1592 Siege of Steenwijk, because it was located in between the line of fire. The opening of a dairy factory resulted in further growth. Villa Oostwoud served as town hall for Steenwijkerwold between 1890 and 1972.

During the 20th century, the area between Tuk and Steenwijk became an industrial zone, and the village now forms a single urban area with the neighbouring city. It has retained its shops in the village centre. In 1972, it became part of the municipality of Steenwijkerland.

== Nature ==
De Woldberg, a 26 metres (85 ft) high remnant of the Last Glacial Period, is located near Tuk, and is covered in beech trees. A tea house is on top of hill, and be reached by 131 steps.
