= Wetering =

- Hamlet
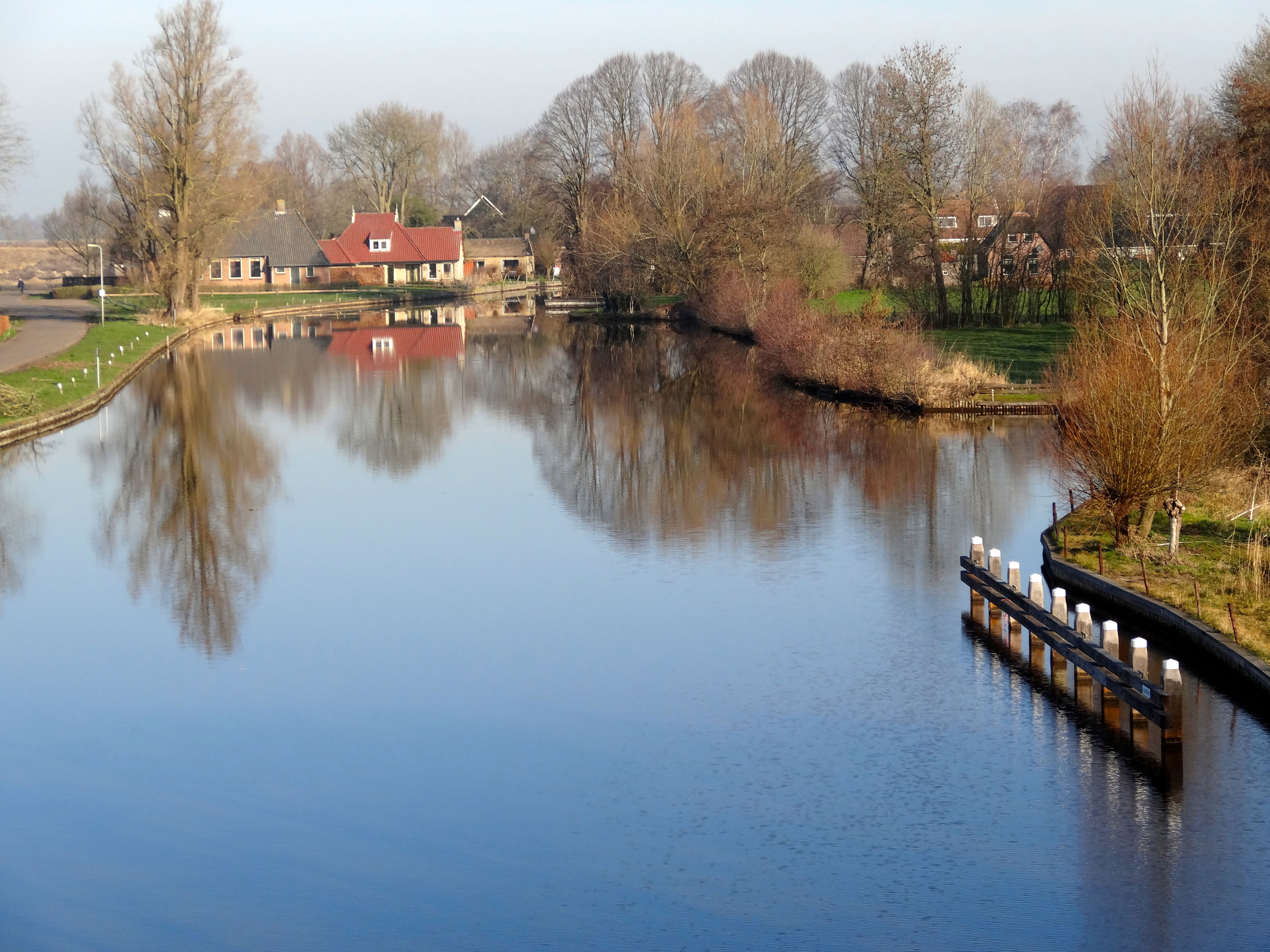
- View on Wetering

- Location in the Netherlands Wetering (Netherlands)
- Coordinates: 52°45′17″N 5°59′45″E
- Country: Netherlands
- Province: Overijssel
- Municipality: Steenwijkerland

Area
  - Total: 6.82 km^{2} (2.63 sq mi)
- Elevation: 0 m (0 ft)

Population (2021)
  - Total: 185
  - Density: 27.1/km^{2} (70.3/sq mi)
- Time zone: UTC+1 (CET)
  - Summer (DST): UTC+2 (CEST)
- Postal code: 8363
- Dialing code: 0521

Wetering is a hamlet in the Dutch province of Overijssel. It is located in the municipality of Steenwijkerland, about 9 km southwest of the town of Steenwijk.

It was first mentioned in 1899 as Wetering, and means "discharge canal". Wetering is a statistical entity, has its own postal code, and has two abandoned churches. Nevertheless it is hamlet probably due to its small population and spread out houses.
