= Belt-Schutsloot =

- Village
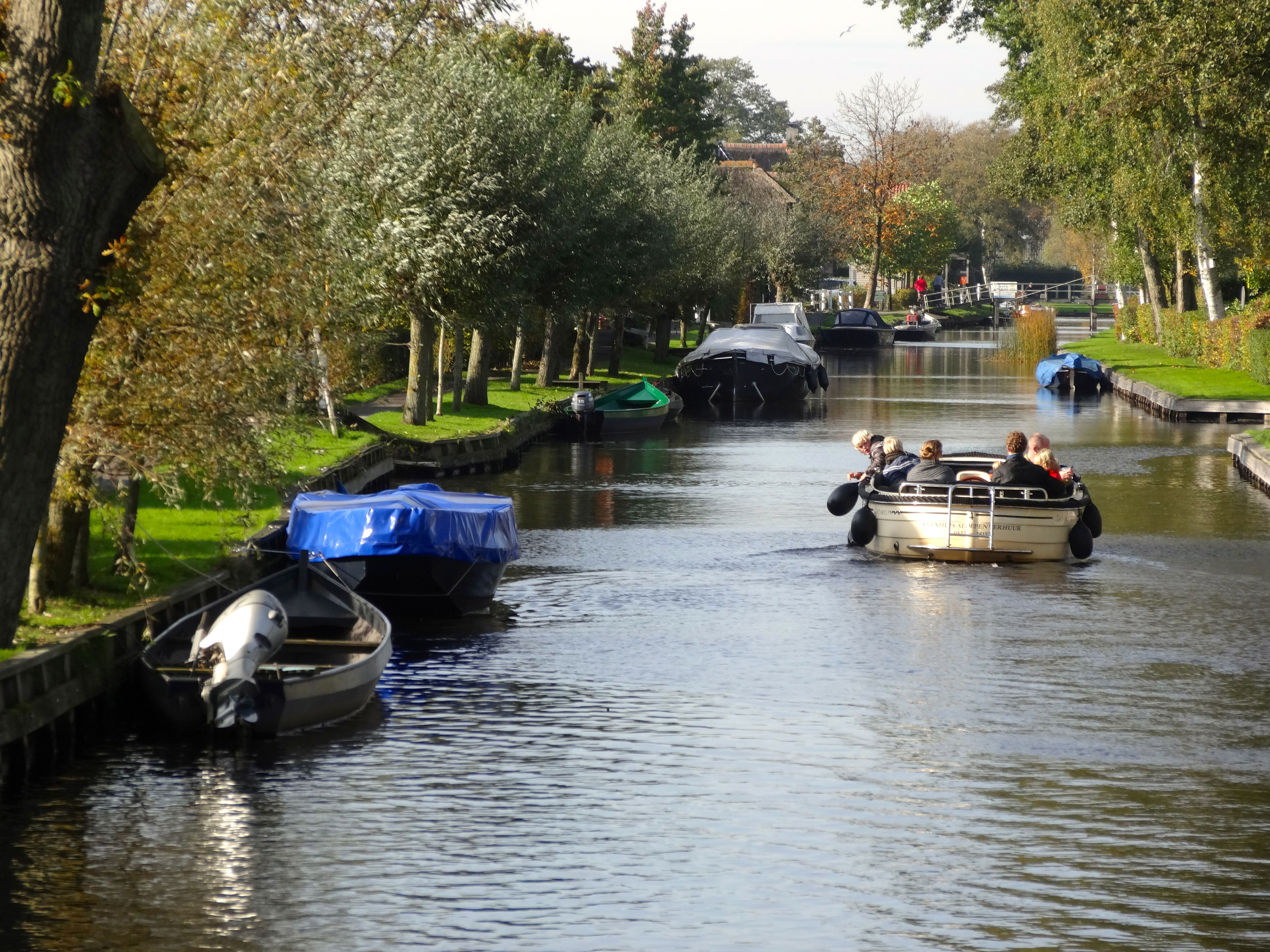

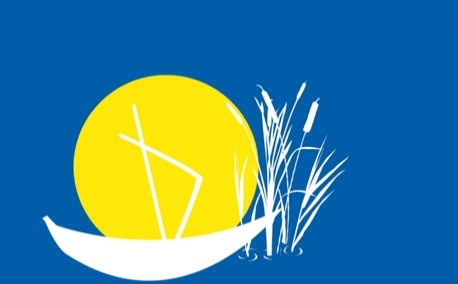
- Flag

- Location in the Netherlands Belt-Schutsloot (Netherlands)
- Coordinates: 52°40′13″N 6°3′46″E
- Country: Netherlands
- Province: Overijssel
- Municipality: Steenwijkerland

Area
  - Total: 10.31 km^{2} (3.98 sq mi)
- Elevation: 0 m (0 ft)

Population (2021)
  - Total: 565
  - Density: 54.8/km^{2} (142/sq mi)
- Time zone: UTC+1 (CET)
  - Summer (DST): UTC+2 (CEST)
- Postal code: 8066
- Dialing code: 038

Belt-Schutsloot is a village in the Dutch province of Overijssel. It is located in the municipality of Steenwijkerland, about 3 km north of Zwartsluis.

The village originally consisted of two parts, Belt (also called "Zandbelt") and Schutsloot, and was also called "Schutsloot en Zandbelt".

== Overview ==
It was first mentioned in 1748 as "Sandbeld en Schutsloot". Belt means little height, and Schutsloot means "ditch with sluice". It started as two villages along a canal which merged into a single settlement. In 1840, Zandbelt was home to 130 people and Schutsloot 208 people.

Up to 1959, Belt-Schutsloot could not be accessed by road. The village is similar to nearby Giethoorn, however it has not fallen pray to mass tourism.

== Gallery ==
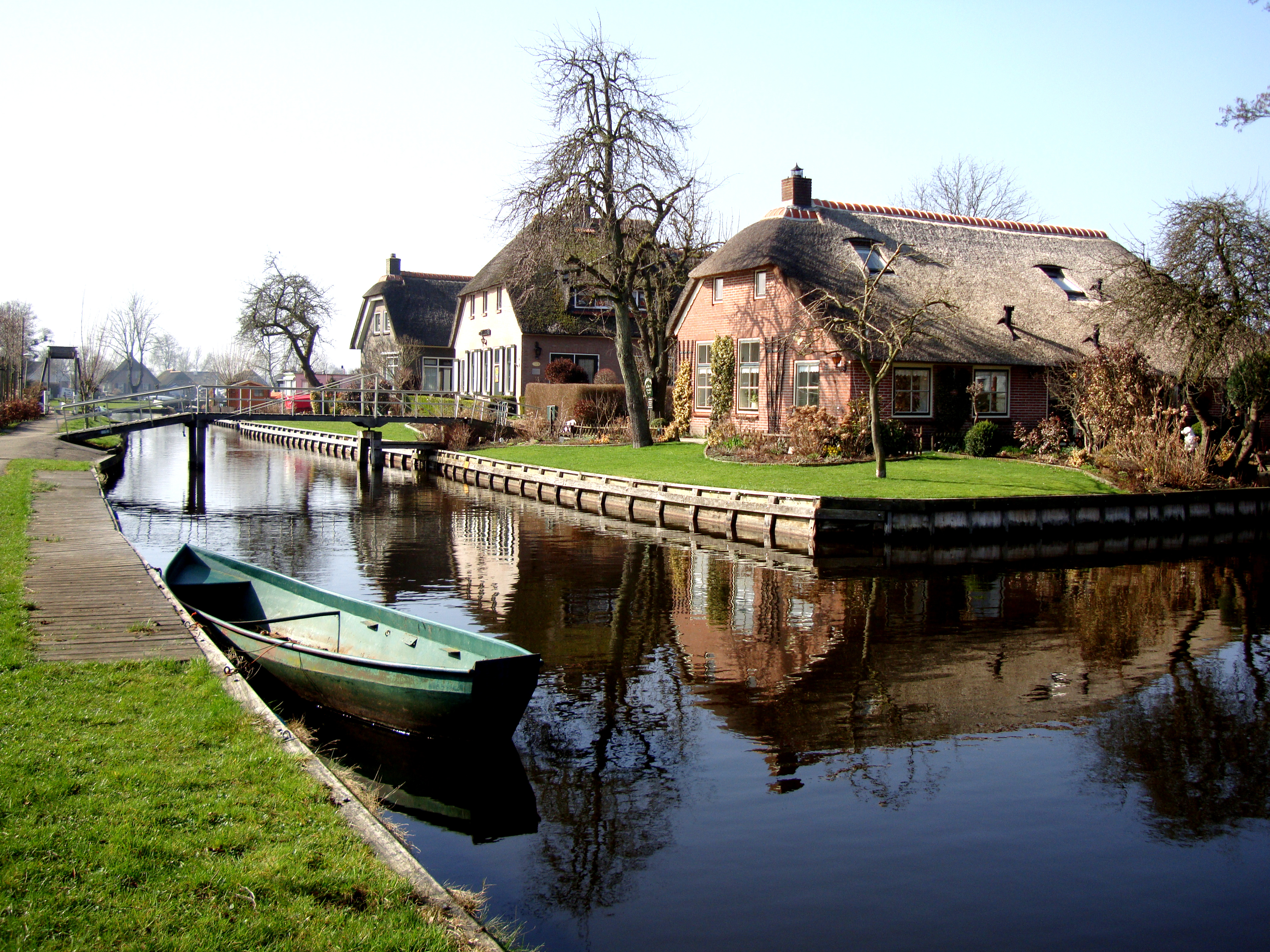
Farms in Belt-Schutsloot

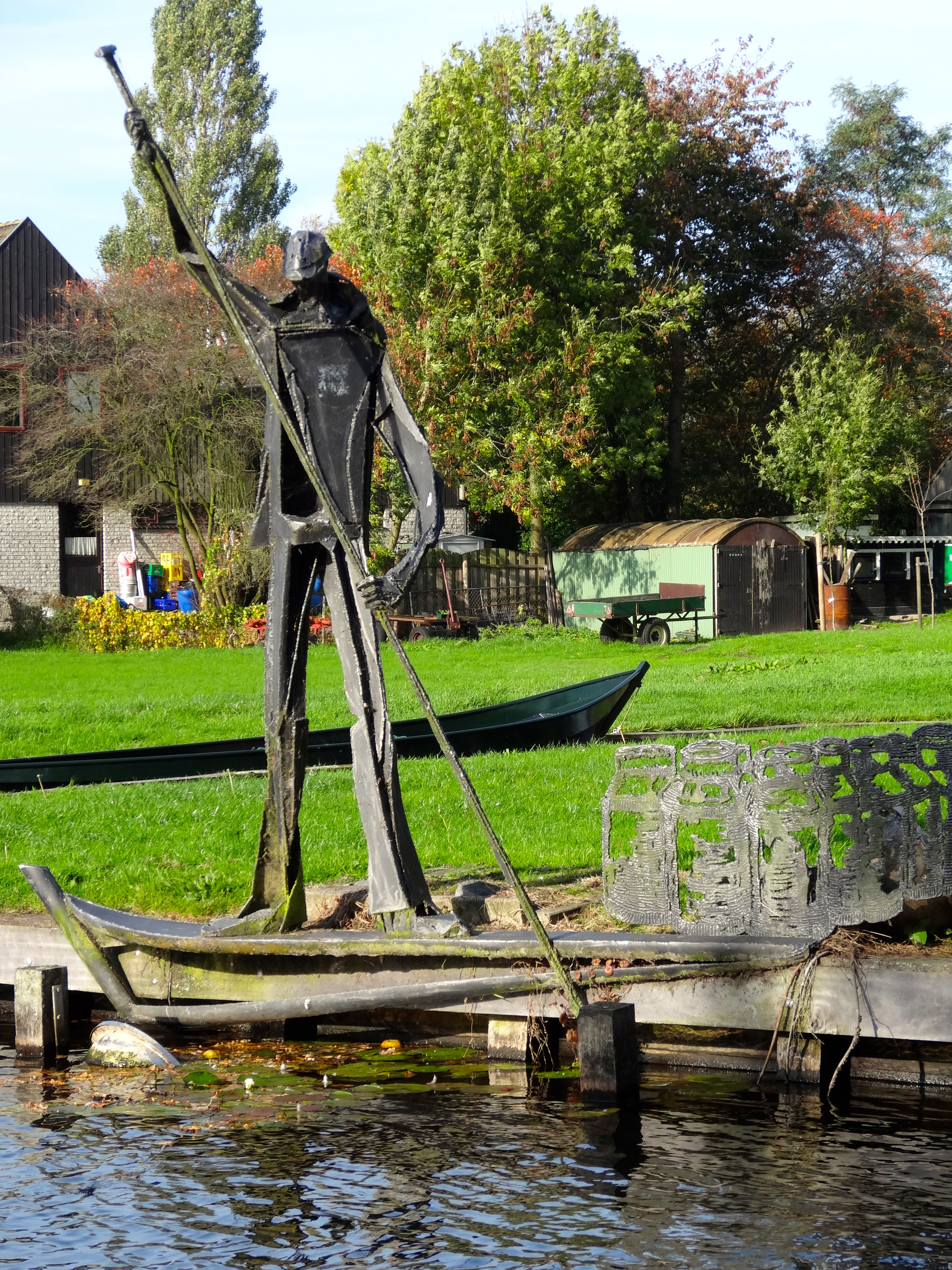
The milk man statue by Hans Mes
