= Basse, Netherlands =

Basse
- Hamlet
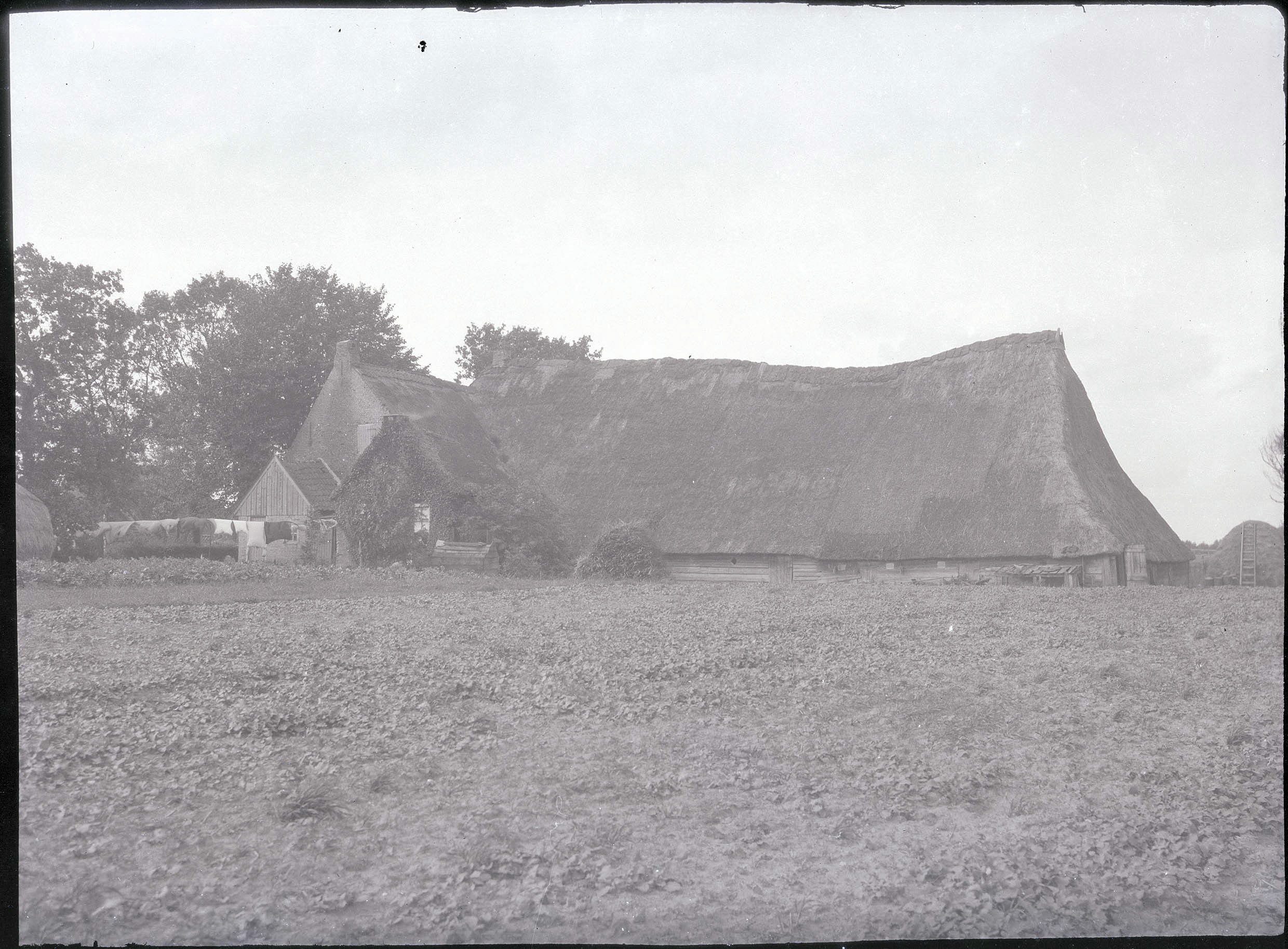
- Farm in Basse (1924)

- Location in the Netherlands Basse (Netherlands)
- Coordinates: 52°48′16″N 6°1′56″E
- Country: Netherlands
- Province: Overijssel
- Municipality: Steenwijkerland

Area
  - Total: 5.47 km^{2} (2.11 sq mi)
- Elevation: 5 m (16 ft)

Population (2021)
  - Total: 260
  - Density: 48/km^{2} (120/sq mi)
- Time zone: UTC+1 (CET)
  - Summer (DST): UTC+2 (CEST)
- Postal code: 8342
- Dialing code: 0521

Basse is a hamlet in the Dutch province of Overijssel. It is located in the municipality Steenwijkerland, about 7 km northwest of Steenwijk.

It was first mentioned in 1425 as Bassinghe, and means "settlement belonging to Basse (person)". It is a stretched out settlement. The farm Bassinghe used to contain a clandestine church.

Since 1983, Basse organises the "Battle of Basse", a car and motocross on a dirt track.
