= Kop van Overijssel =

Region of the Dutch province of Overijssel

Coordinates: 52°45′N 6°1′E

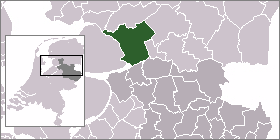
The Kop van Overijssel

The Kop van Overijssel (English: Head of Overijssel) is a region in the very northwestern part of the Dutch province of Overijssel. It consists of the municipality of Steenwijkerland and matches the historical region of the Land van Vollenhove. In past times it comprised a wider area, the municipalities of Kampen, Zwartewaterland and Staphorst also belonging to it.

The Kop van Overijssel has about 43,000 inhabitants and an area of about 322 km^{2}, of which a tenth is water. The 'capital' is Steenwijk. Other noteworthy places are Blokzijl, Giethoorn (a 'Venice of the North') and Vollenhove.

The region is nearly surrounded by three provincial borders: in the west that of Flevoland (Noordoostpolder region), in the north that of Friesland (Stellingwerven region) and in the east that of Drenthe (the municipalities of Westerveld and Meppel). In the south it borders on Salland, another region of Overijssel.

In the is a marsh of about 60 km^{2}, Nationaal Park Weerribben-Wieden. It is a national park that contains the lakes Beulakerwijde and Belterwijde.

== Gallery ==
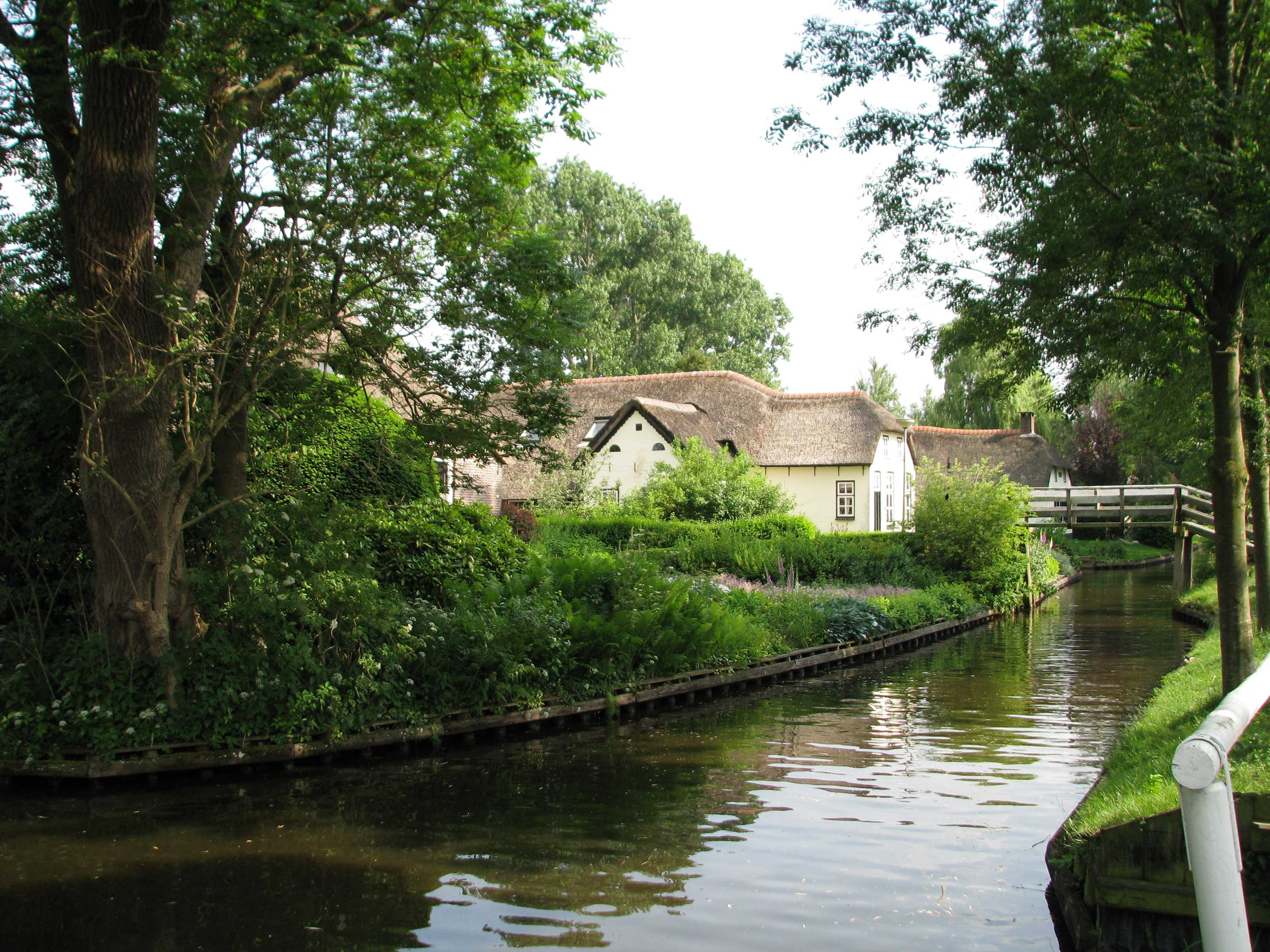
Canal in Giethoorn

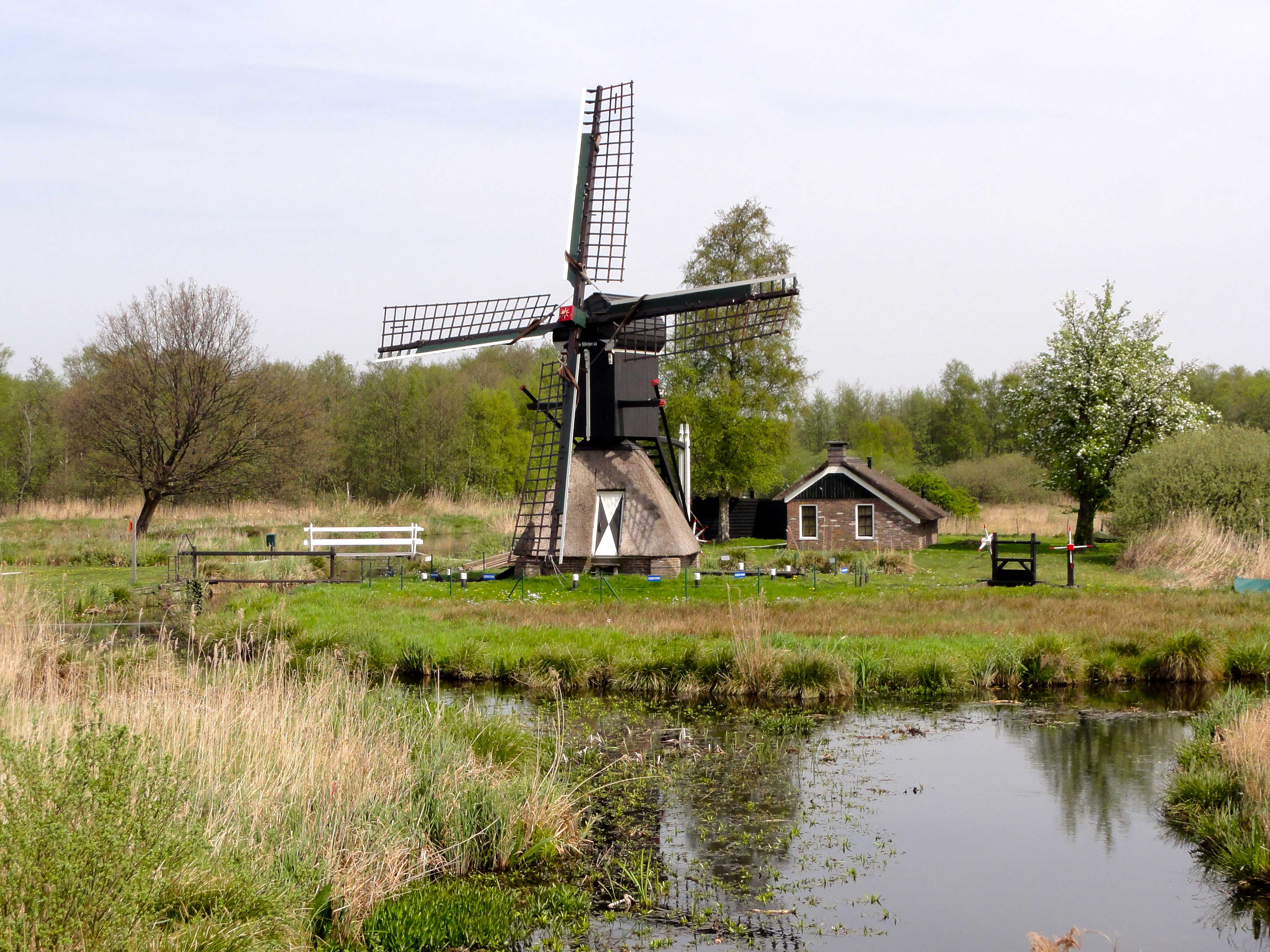
Windmill near Kalenberg

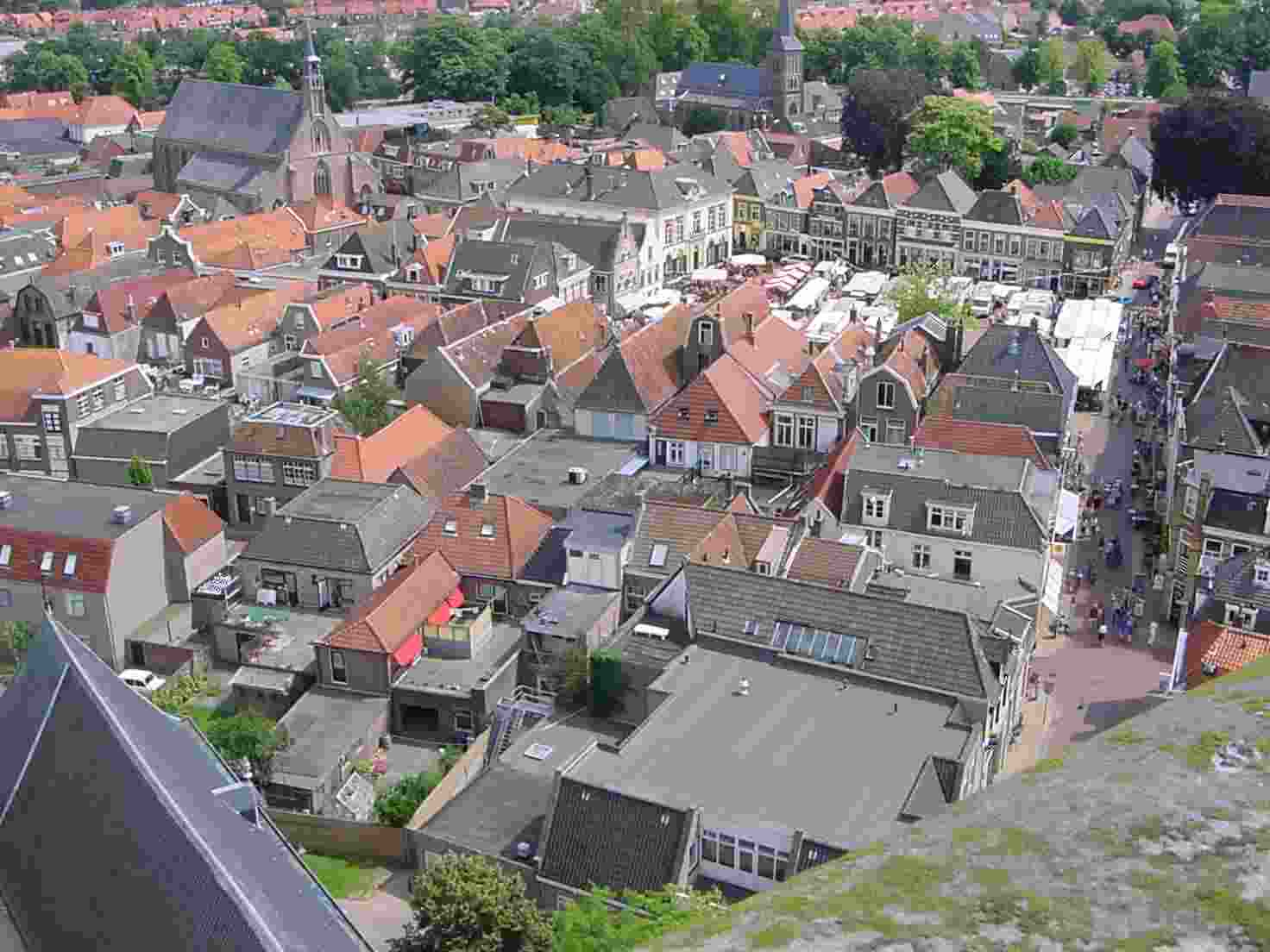
Steenwijk from above

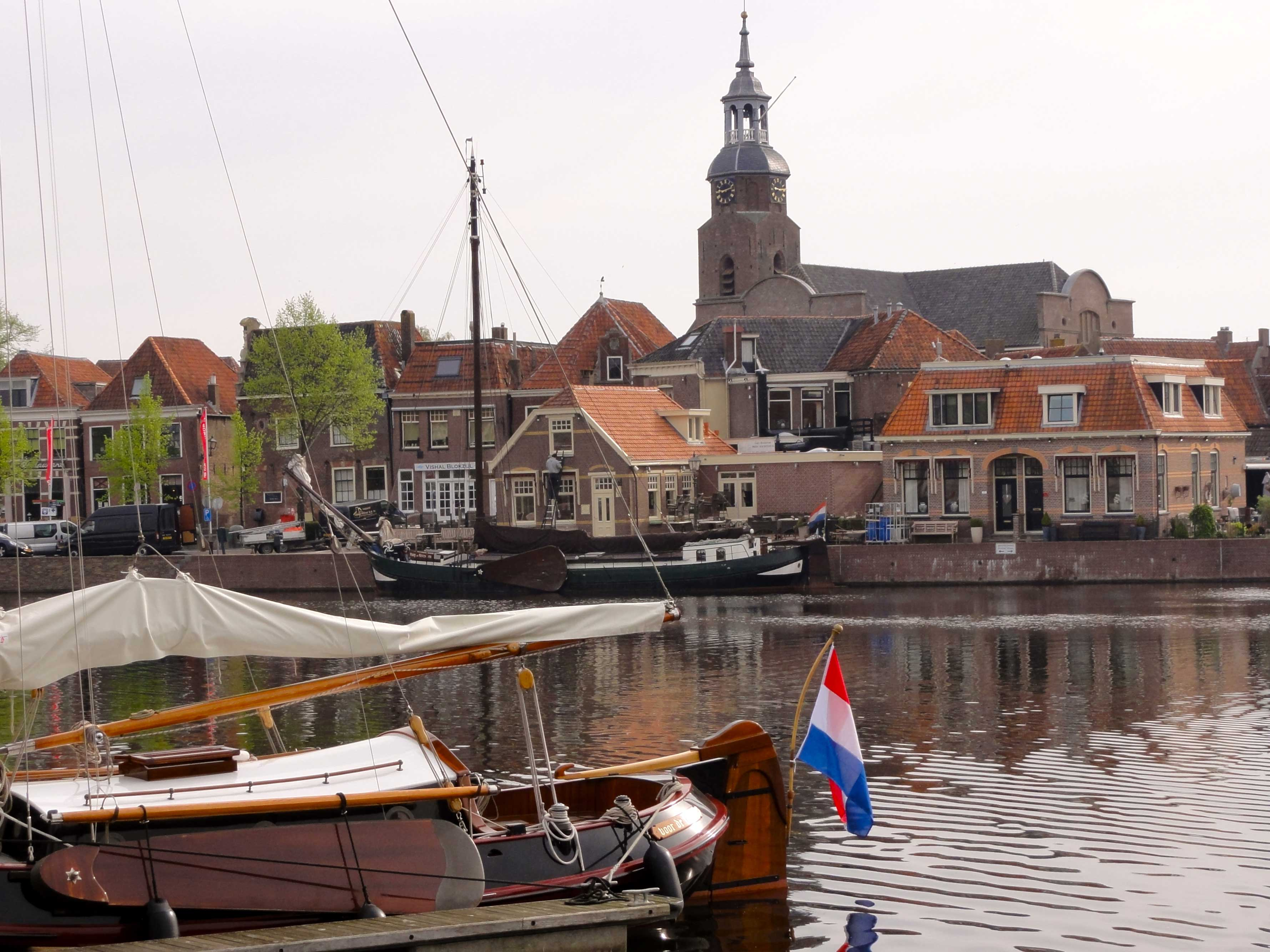
Harbor of Blokzijl

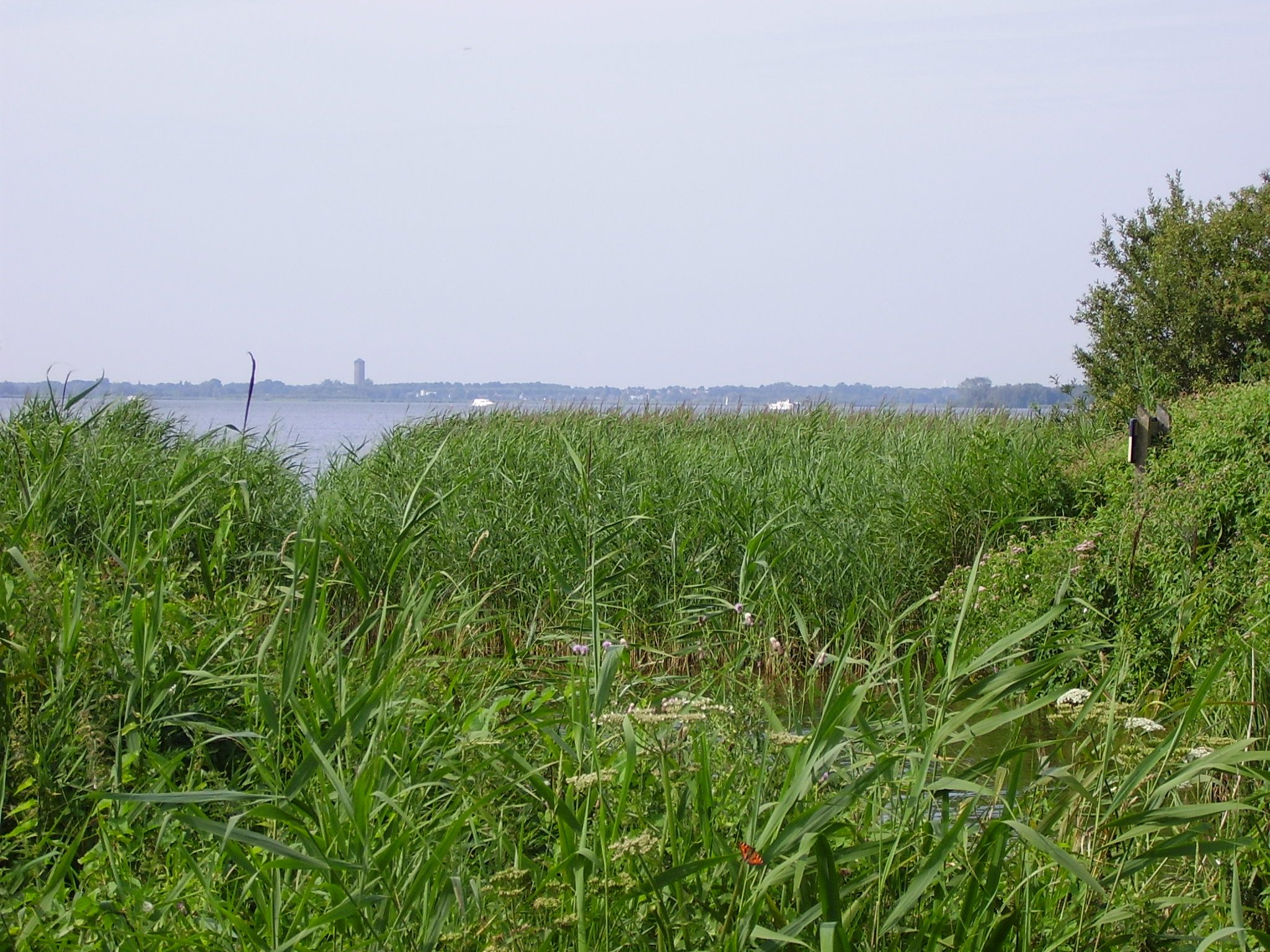
Shore of the Beulakerwijde

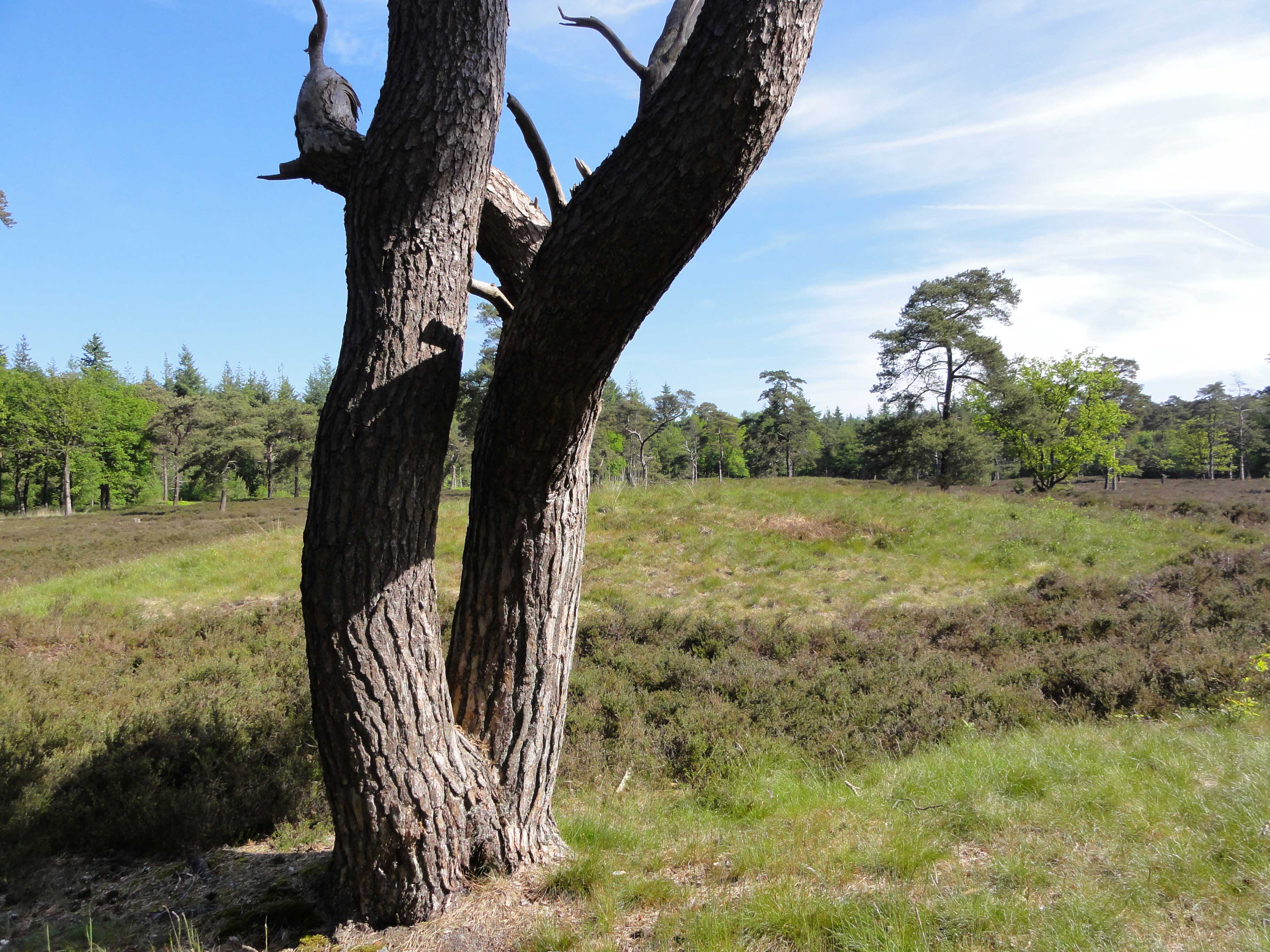
Barrows near Eesveen

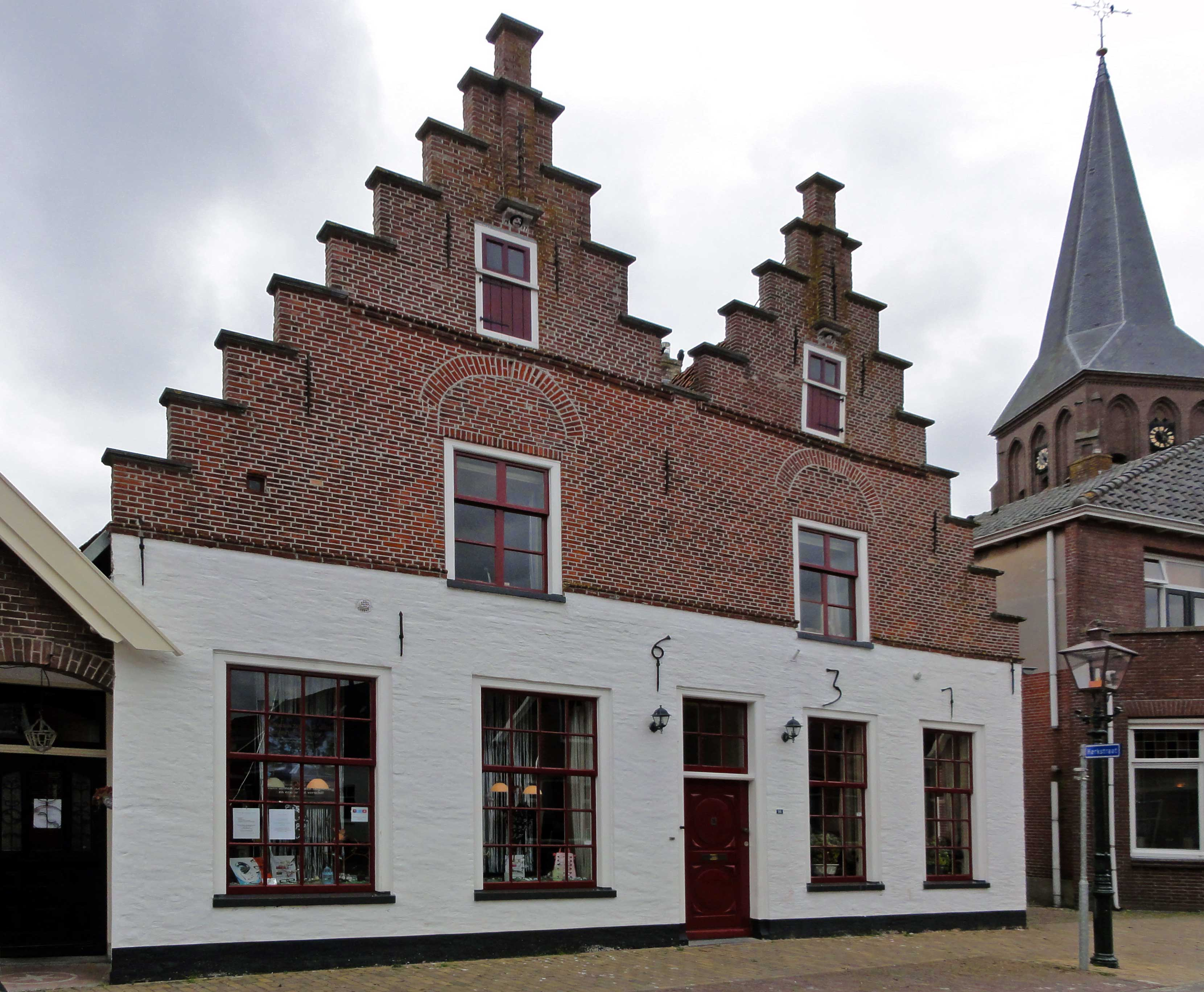
Old houses in Oldemarkt

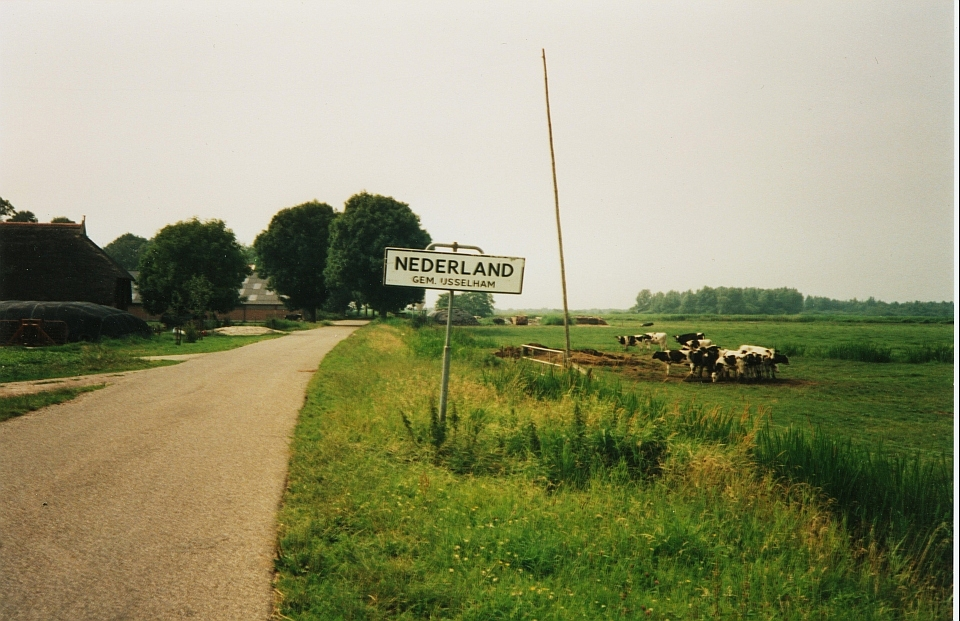
Hamlet of Nederland
