= Baars, Overijssel =

Village in Overijssel, the Netherlands

Baars
- Hamlet
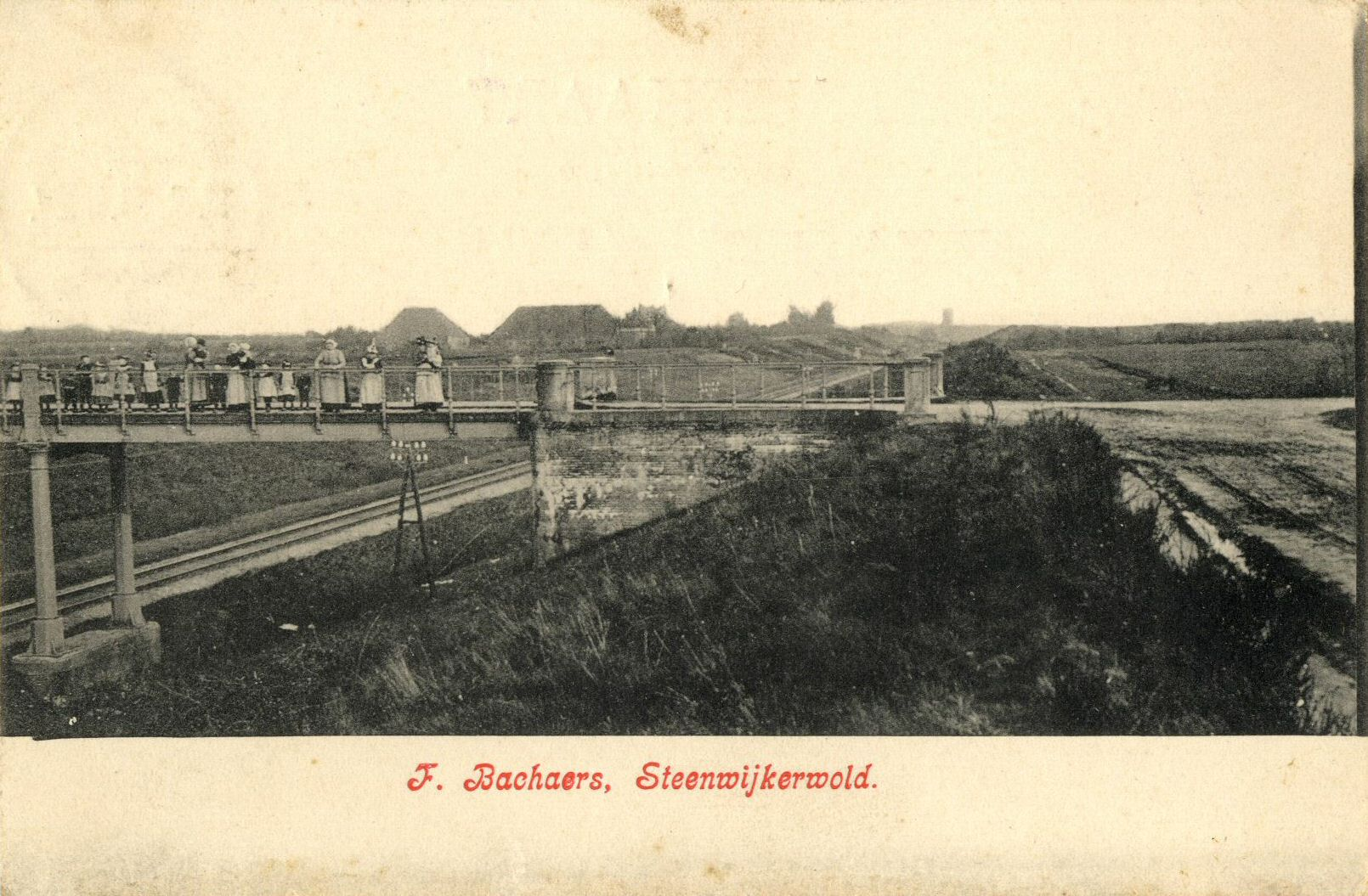
- Bridge over the railway near Baars (1913-1918)

- Location in the Netherlands Baars (Netherlands)
- Coordinates: 52.8139°N 6.0873°E
- Country: Netherlands
- Province: Overijssel
- Municipality: Steenwijkerland

Area
  - Total: 2.12 km^{2} (0.82 sq mi)
- Elevation: 13 m (43 ft)

Population (2021)
  - Total: 85
  - Density: 40/km^{2} (100/sq mi)
- Time zone: UTC+1 (CET)
  - Summer (DST): UTC+2 (CEST)
- Postal code: 8336
- Dialing code: 0521
- Website: WittePaardenBaars.nl

Baars is a hamlet in the Dutch province of Overijssel. It is located in the municipality Steenwijkerland, about 4 km northwest of the town of Steenwijk.

It was first mentioned in 1340 as Baersdijc, and refers to a farm named Baers which is the Dutch word for the European perch. It is a statistical entity, and has its own postal code. It used to have place name signs, but they have been removed again. The hamlet shares resources with neighbouring Witte Paarden.
