= Steenwijkerwold =

- Village
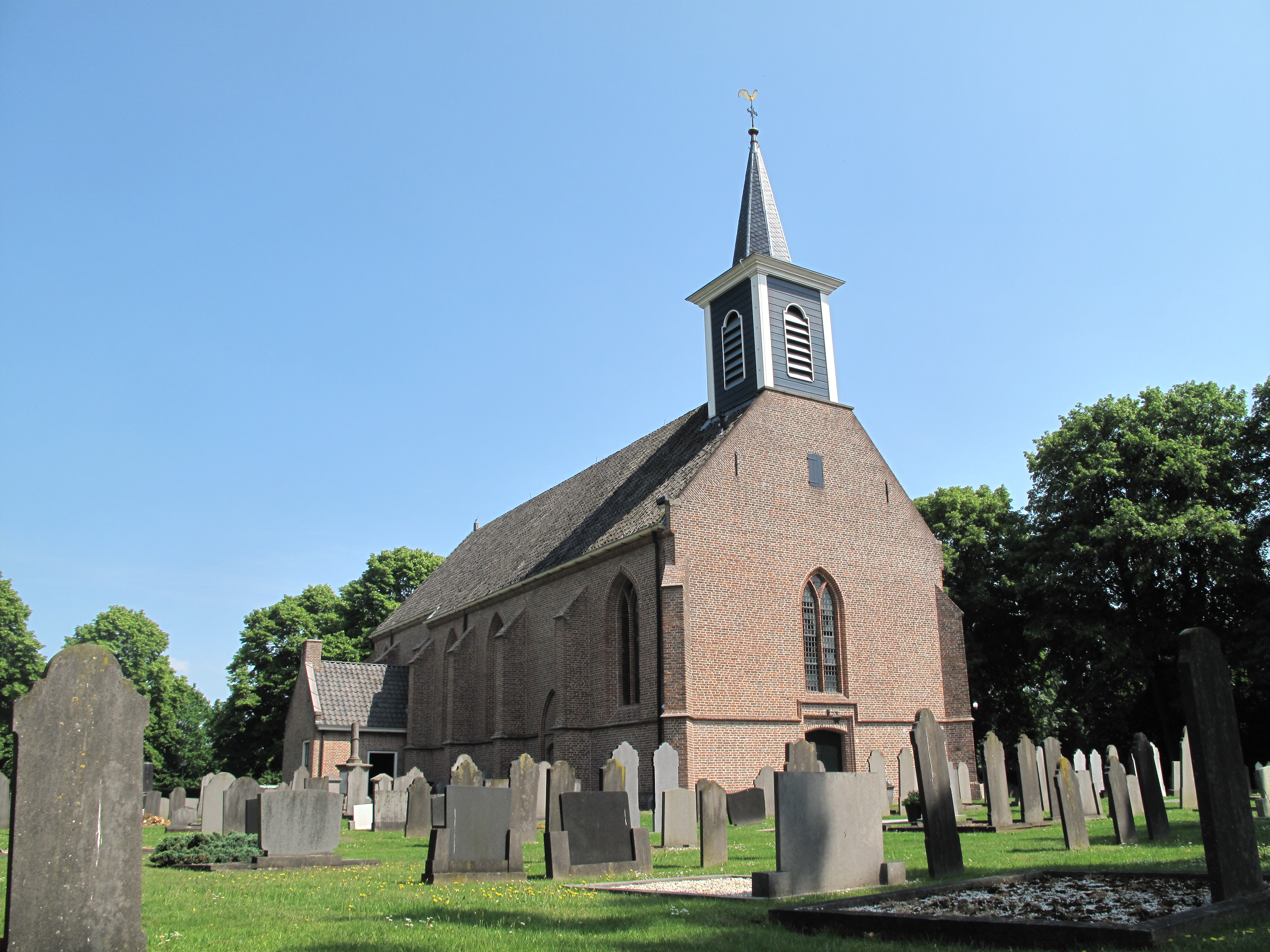
- Hervormde Kerk, Steenwijkerwold

- Location in the Netherlands Steenwijkerwold (Netherlands)
- Coordinates: 52°48′13″N 6°3′42″E
- Country: Netherlands
- Province: Overijssel
- Municipality: Steenwijkerland

Area
  - Total: 10.31 km^{2} (3.98 sq mi)
- Elevation: 8 m (26 ft)

Population (2021)
  - Total: 1,910
  - Density: 185/km^{2} (480/sq mi)
- Time zone: UTC+1 (CET)
  - Summer (DST): UTC+2 (CEST)
- Postal code: 8341
- Dialing code: 0521
- Major roads: A32

Steenwijkerwold is a village in the Dutch province of Overijssel. It is located in the municipality of Steenwijkerland, about 5 km northwest of Steenwijk. Steenwijkerwold was a separate municipality until 1973, when it became a part of Steenwijk.

== History ==
It was first mentioned in 1376 as Steenwickerwolde, and means forest near Steenwijk. It developed when Kerkbuurt, Gelderingen and Thij, three esdorp villages, merged. In 1401, a church was built, and the village became independent from the neighbouring city in 1543. The Dutch Reformed Church dates from the 15th century. In 1840, it was home to 1,369 people.

The dolmen (megalithic tomb) O1 used to be located in Steenwijkerwold. In 1781, it was in good condition and probably had 6 capstones. In the 1840s, it was thoroughly removed.

== Notable people ==
- Herman Nieweg (1932–1999), sculptor and ceramist.
- Johan Wardenier (1942), speed skater, born in Steenwijkerwold
- Josje Huisman (1986), singer, actress, dancer grew up in Steenwijkerwold
