= Nederland, Overijssel =

Nederland
- Hamlet
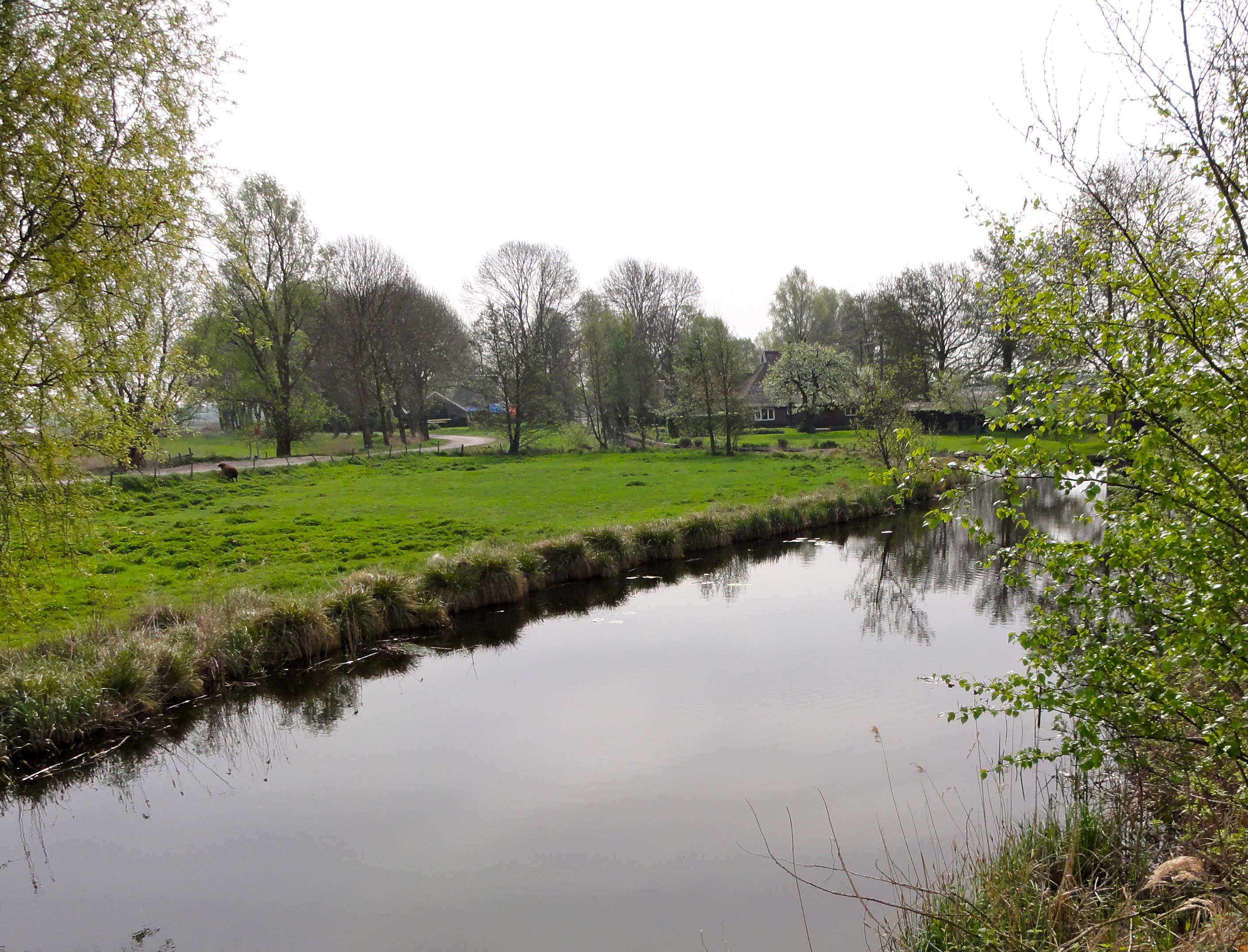
- A view of Nederland

- Location in the Netherlands Nederland (Netherlands)
- Coordinates: 52°45′18″N 5°57′54″E
- Country: Netherlands
- Province: Overijssel
- Municipality: Steenwijkerland

Area
  - Total: 1.15 km^{2} (0.44 sq mi)
- Elevation: 0 m (0 ft)

Population (2021)
  - Total: 15
  - Density: 13/km^{2} (34/sq mi)
- Time zone: UTC+1 (CET)
  - Summer (DST): UTC+2 (CEST)
- Postal code: 8362
- Dialing code: 0527

Nederland is a hamlet in the Steenwijkerland municipality in Overijssel, Netherlands. It has a population of about 15. 'Nederland' is the Dutch name for the Netherlands. Because of the comical value of the toponym, roadsigns with the name 'Nederland' are stolen frequently.

It was first mentioned between 1830 and 1855 as 't Nederland, and means "low-lying land". Nederland has a statistical entry, and its own postal code. Originally, it was only accessible by boat. In 1840, it was home to 182 people, and was a peat excavation village.

The Dutch beer company Bavaria has used Nederland in a commercial. In the commercial two men are giving away beer in the hamlet. It ends with (in translation): Bavaria, popular throughout Nederland.

The hamlet was pictured on a Dutch postage stamp.

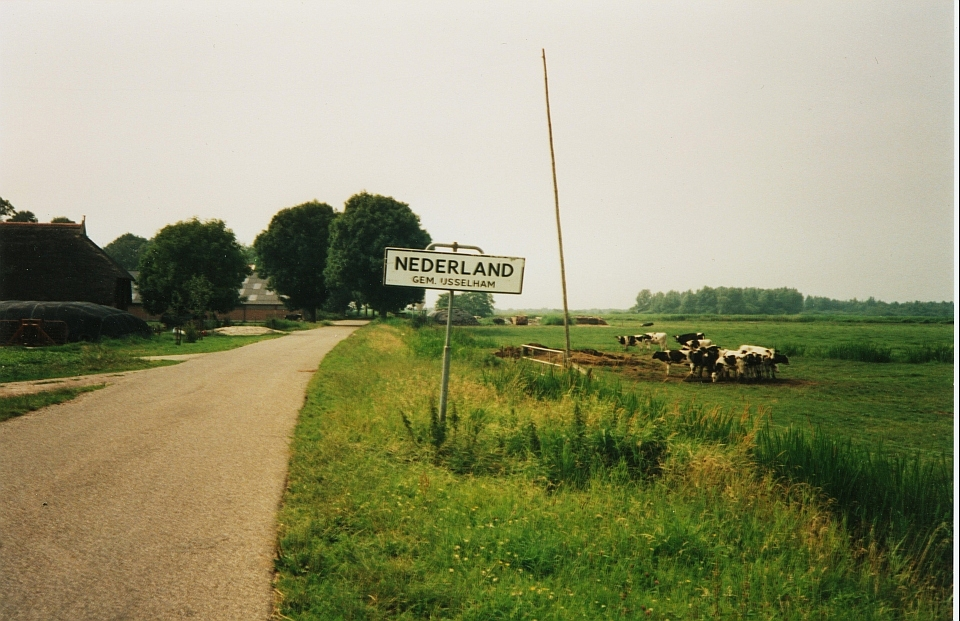
An old name sign, long since stolen.

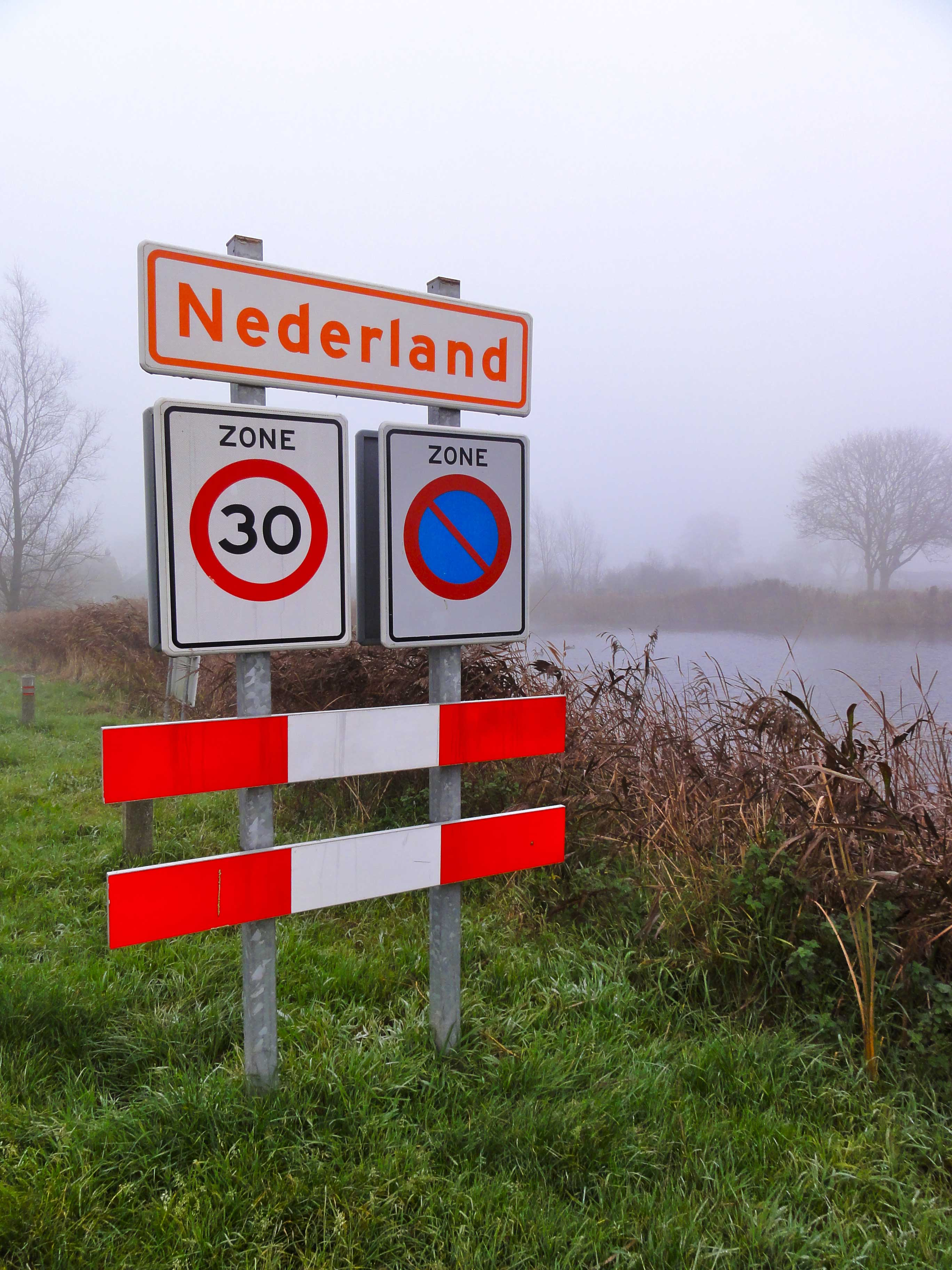
signs of agglomeration

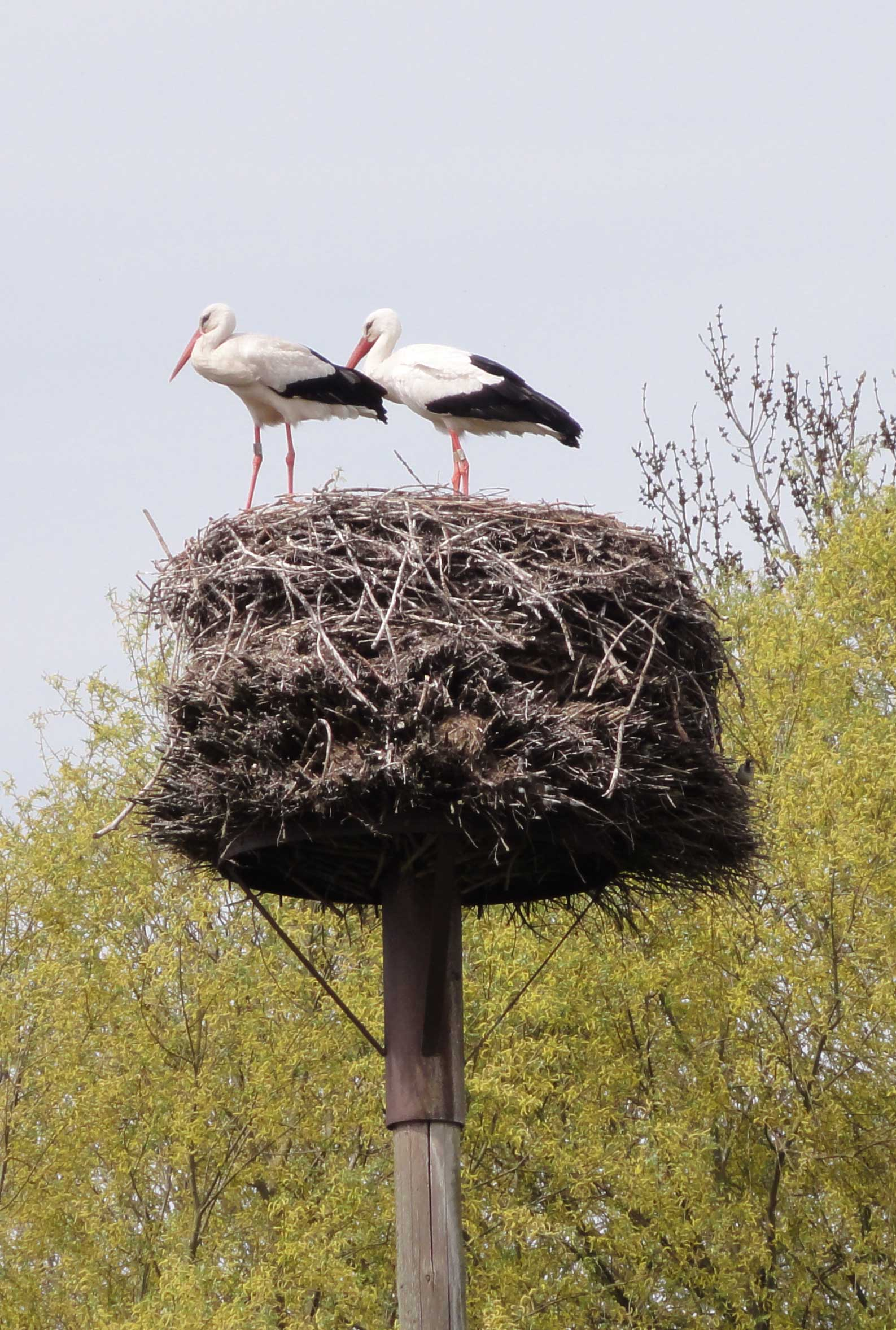
Two storks in Nederland
