= Herman Nieweg =

Dutch sculptor and ceramist

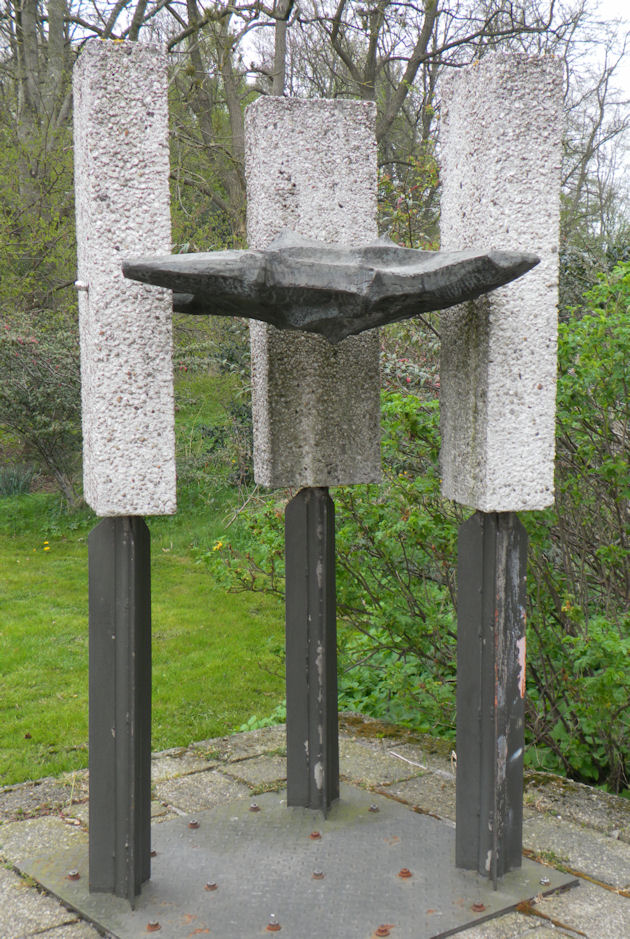
3 Columns with bird with children in Assen.

Herman Nieweg (April 13, 1932 – May 28, 1999) was a Dutch sculptor and ceramist.

== Life and work ==
Nieweg was born in Steenwijkerwold and studied interior design at the Academy of Fine Arts in Rotterdam. His teacher Frieda Koch brought him into contact with ceramics. As an artist Nieweg is autodidact.

From the 1960s to the 1980s Nieweg lived and worked in Giethoorn, where he ran his own pottery studio. In the 1990s he moved to Monchique in Portugal, where he built several large ovens. He died in Portugal a few years later, at the age of 67.

Much of Nieweg's work was done in ceramics, examples are the reliefs he made for Zwolle and Heino.

== Works ==
- 1973, image 3 Columns with bird with children in Assen
- 1980, embossed on the city wall of Zwolle.
- 1982, relief on facade of the town in Heino

== See also ==
- List of Dutch sculptors
- List of Dutch ceramists
