= Willemsoord, Steenwijkerland =

Willemsoord
- Village
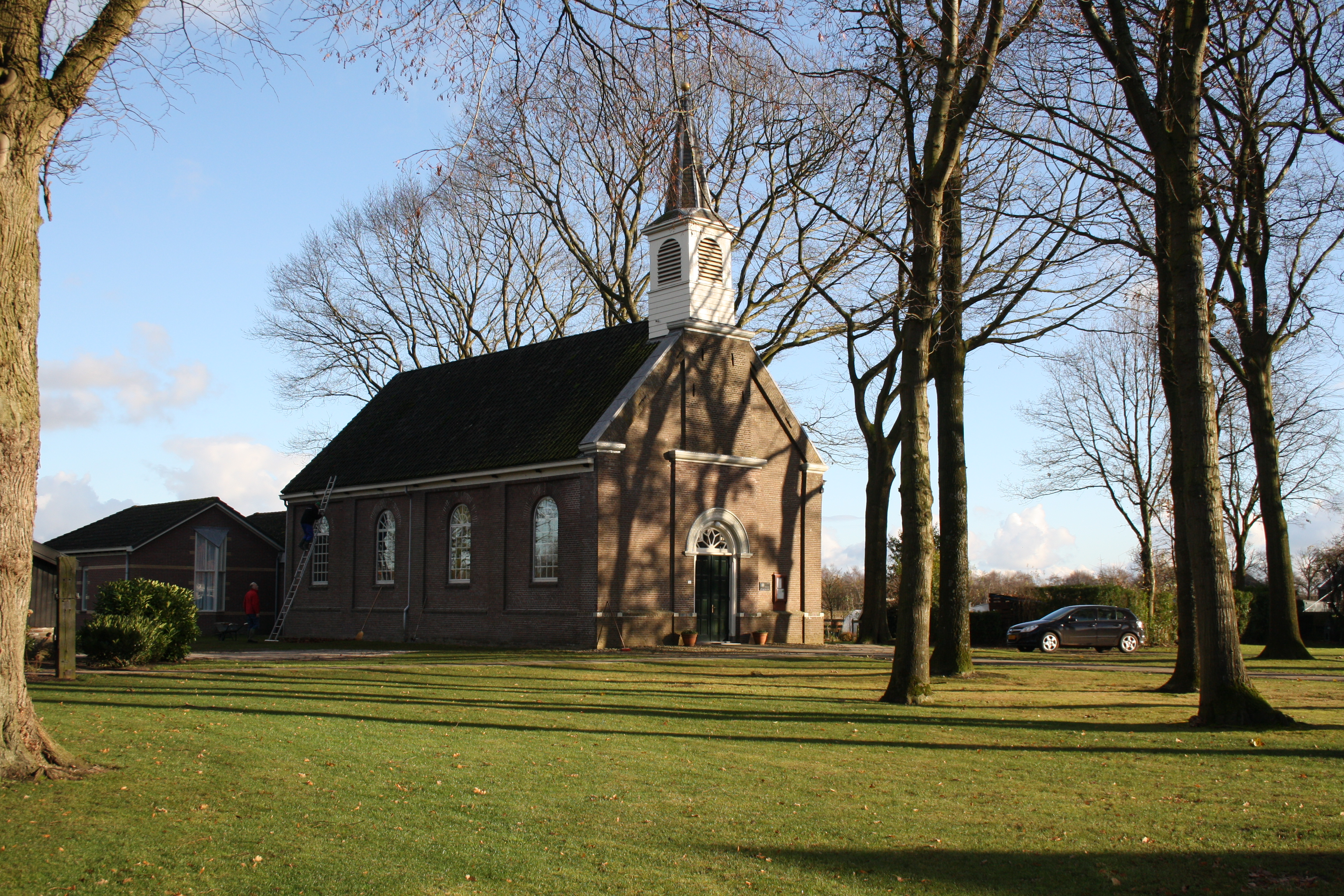
- Dutch Reformed Church of Willemsoord

- Location in the Netherlands
- Country: Netherlands
- Province: Overijssel; Friesland
- Municipality: Steenwijkerland; Weststellingwerf
- Established: 1820

Area
  - Total: 4.68 km^{2} (1.81 sq mi)
- Elevation: 9 m (30 ft)

Population (2021)
  - Total: 895
  - Density: 191/km^{2} (495/sq mi)
- Time zone: UTC+1 (CET)
  - Summer (DST): UTC+2 (CEST)
- Postal code: 8338
- Dialing code: 0521

Willemsoord is a village in the Dutch provinces of Overijssel and Friesland. For the most part it lays within the municipality Steenwijkerland, and small part lays within the municipality of Weststellingwerf. It was founded in 1820 as an orphanage and colony of the Society of Humanitarianism.

A settlement developed around the colony. In 1840, it was home to 925 people. In 1851, a church was built. In 1923, the Society was disbanded and its possessions were sold. In 1942, the national repository of art was built near Willemsoord. It housed over 3,000 art pieces in a bomb resistant bunker-like building.

== Gallery ==
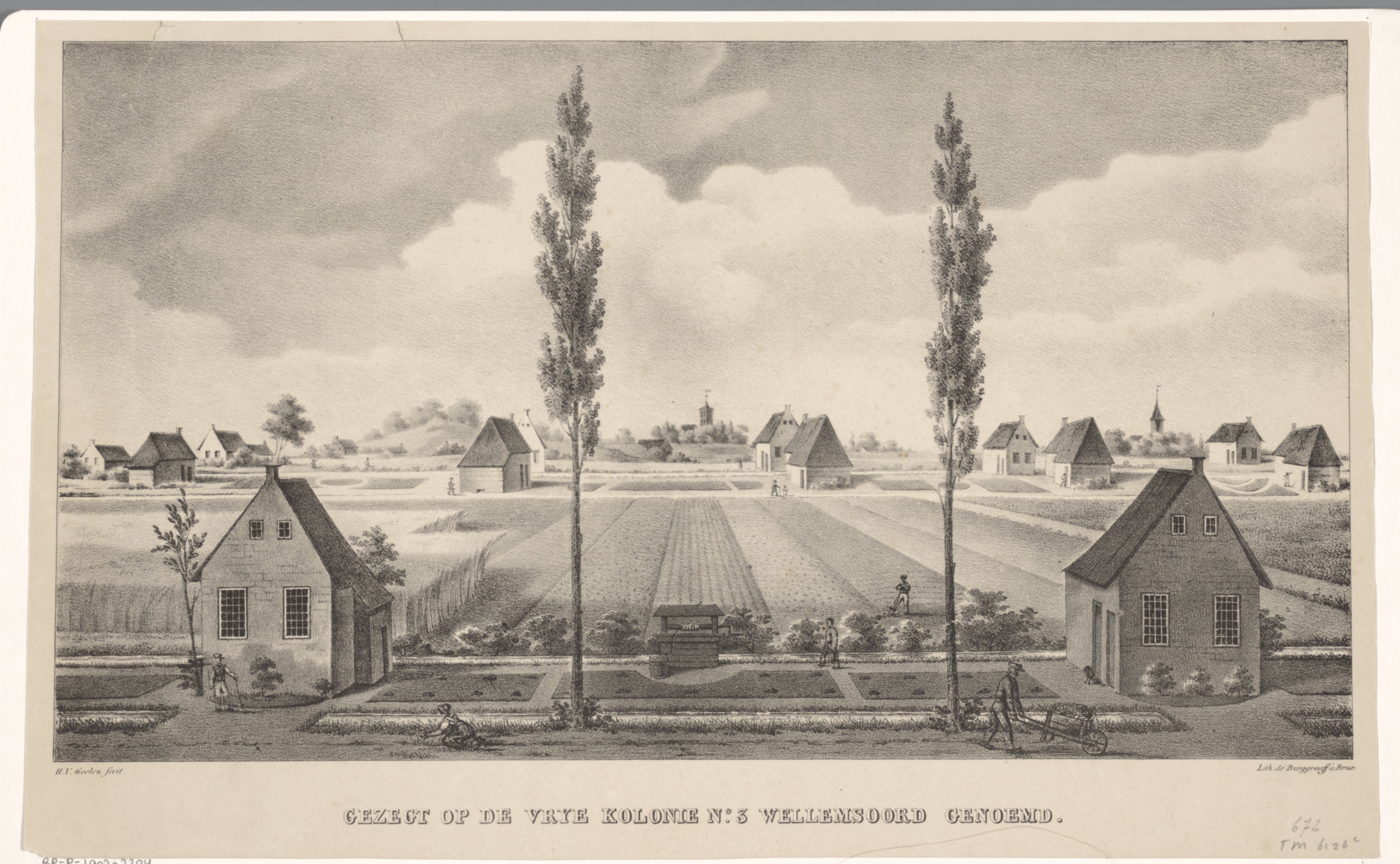
View on the colony (1825-1835)

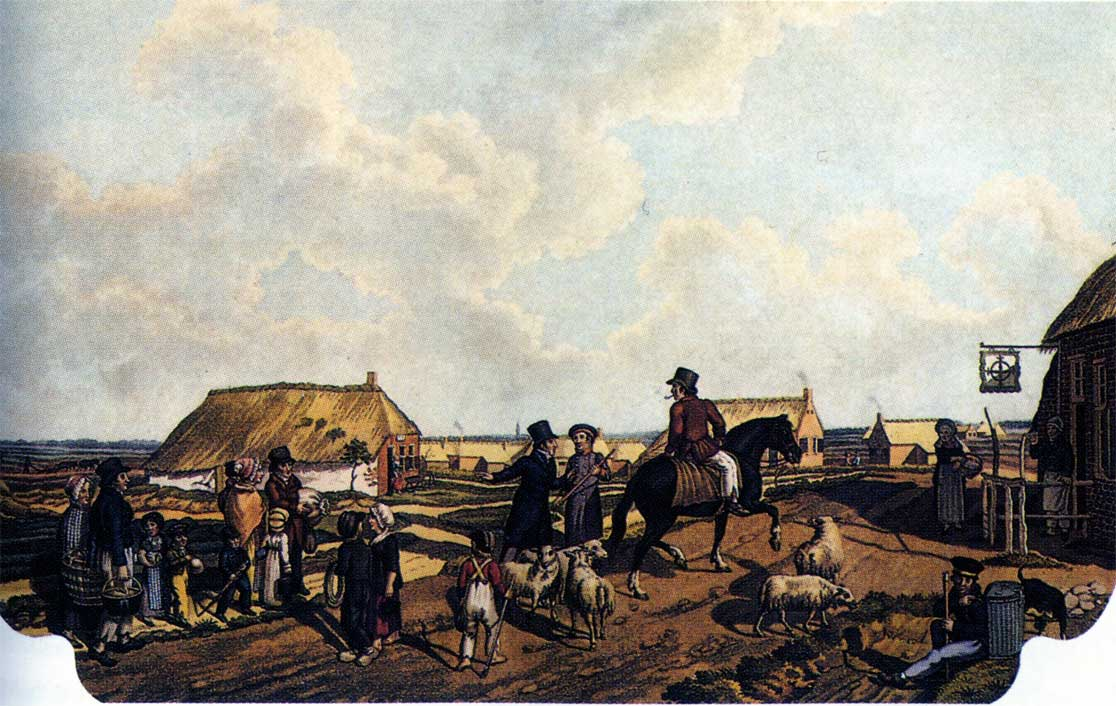
Painting of Willemsoord (c. 1850)

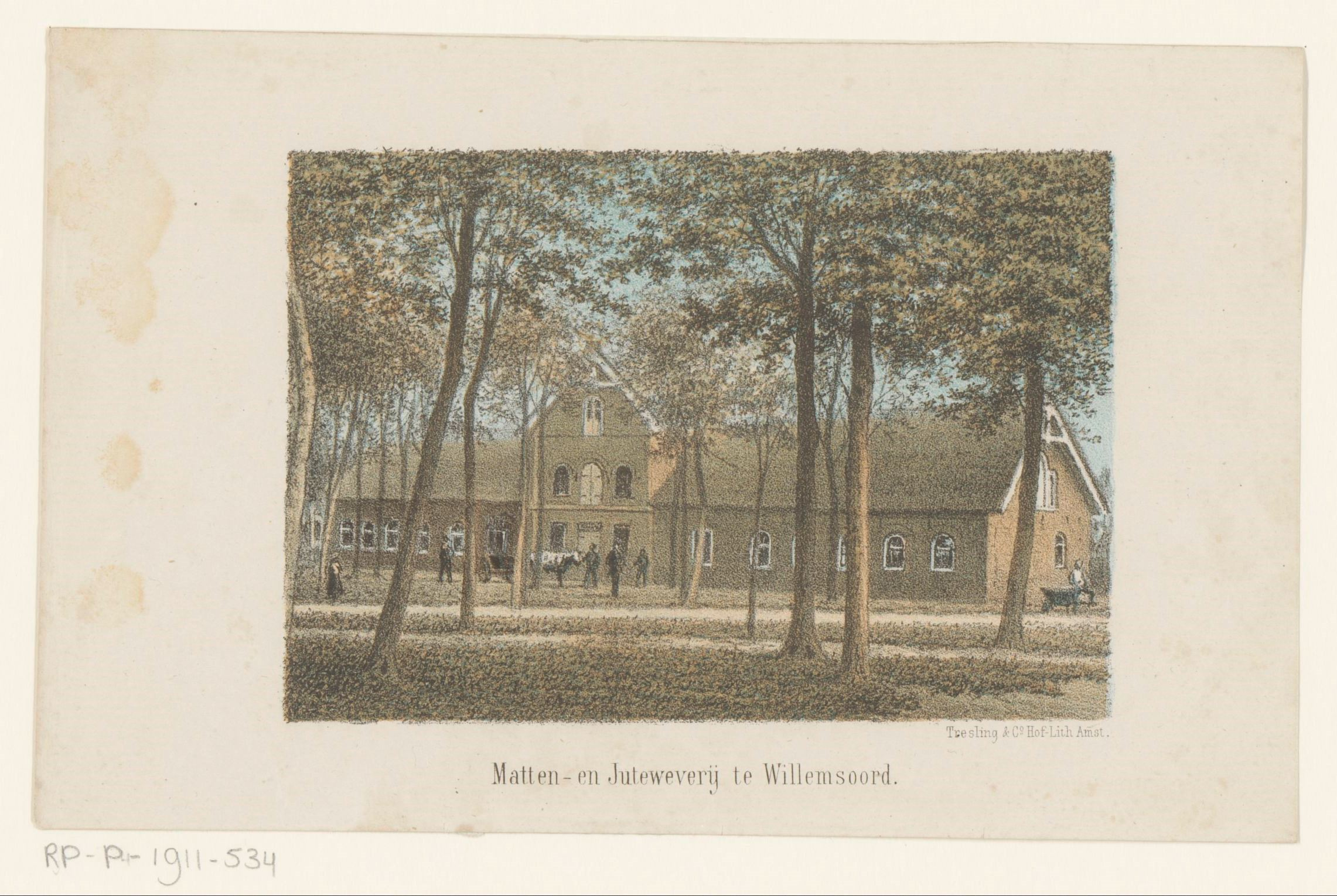
Weaving factory in Willemsoord (1865–1874)

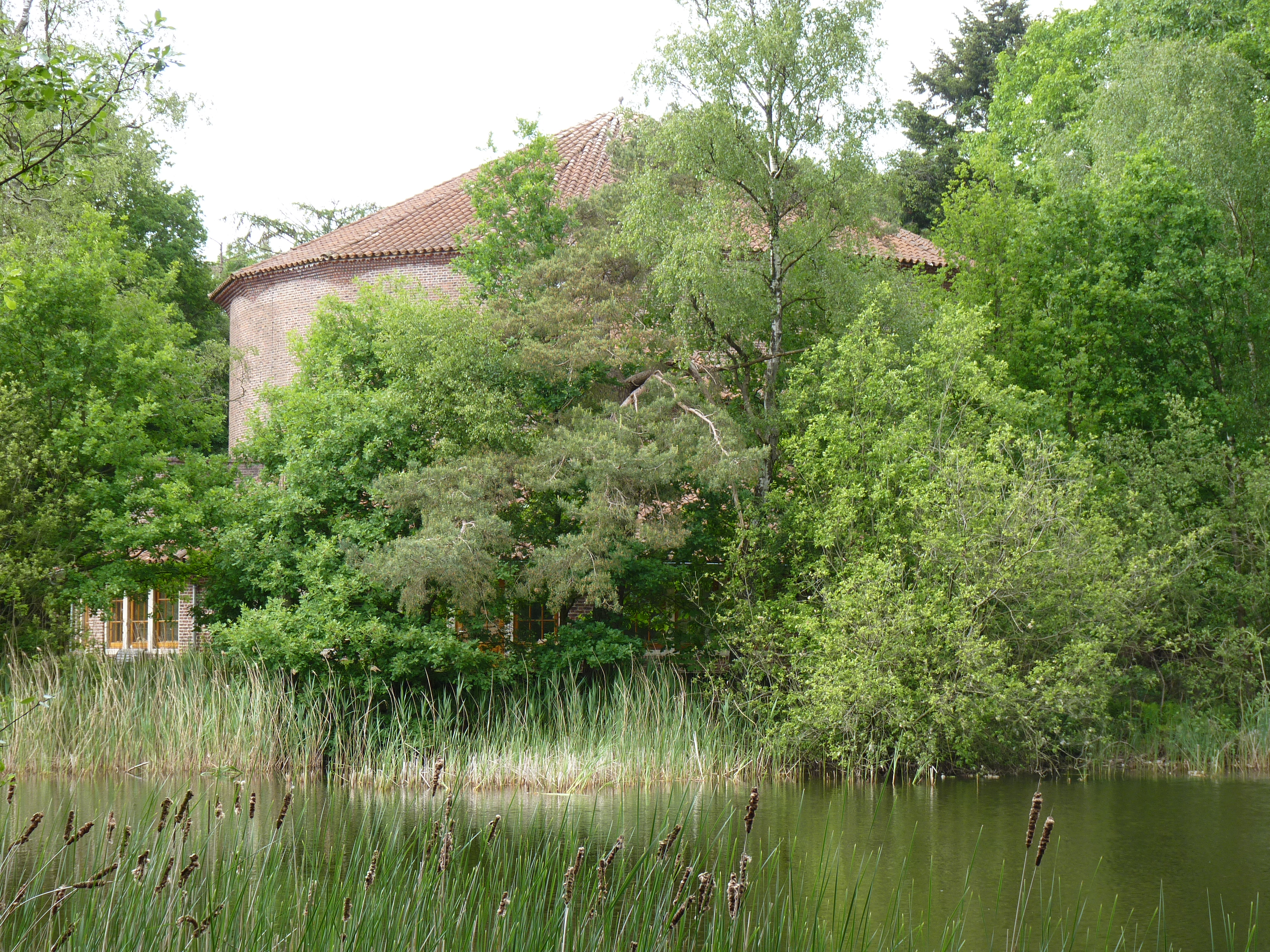
National repository of art
