= Gammelke =

- Hamlet
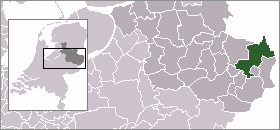

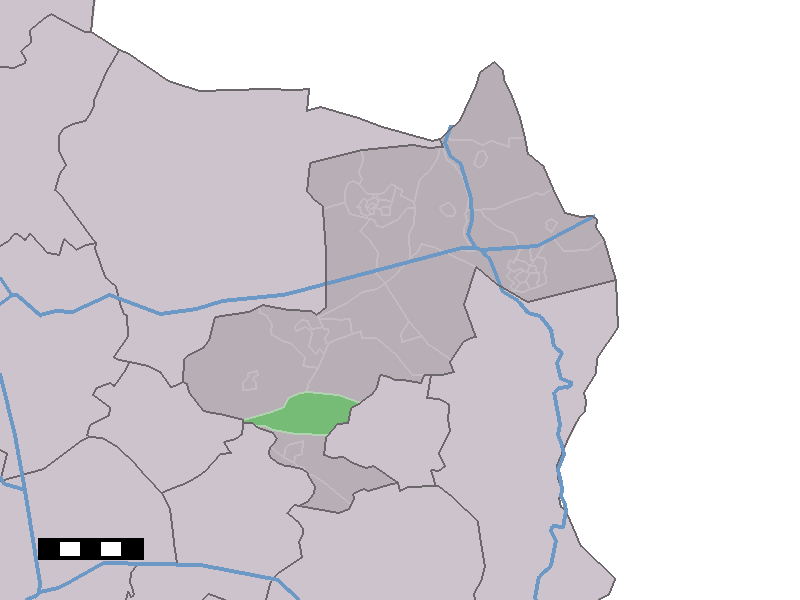
- Gammelke in the municipality of Dinkelland.

- Location in the Netherlands Gammelke (Netherlands)
- Coordinates: 52°19′5″N 6°51′6″E
- Country: Netherlands
- Province: Overijssel
- Municipality: Dinkelland
- Elevation: 19 m (62 ft)
- Time zone: UTC+1 (CET)
  - Summer (DST): UTC+2 (CEST)
- Postal code: 7561
- Dialing code: 074

Gammelke is a hamlet in the Dutch province of Overijssel. It is a part of the municipality of Dinkelland, and lies about 5 km west of Oldenzaal.

Gammelke is not a statistical entity, and the postal authorities have placed it under Deurningen. It was first mentioned in 1272 as Gamminclo, and means "the forest of Gammo (person)". In 1840, it was home to 267 people. Nowadays it consists of about 100 houses.

Seven burial mounds from the Neolithic or Bronze Age have been discovered near Gammelke.

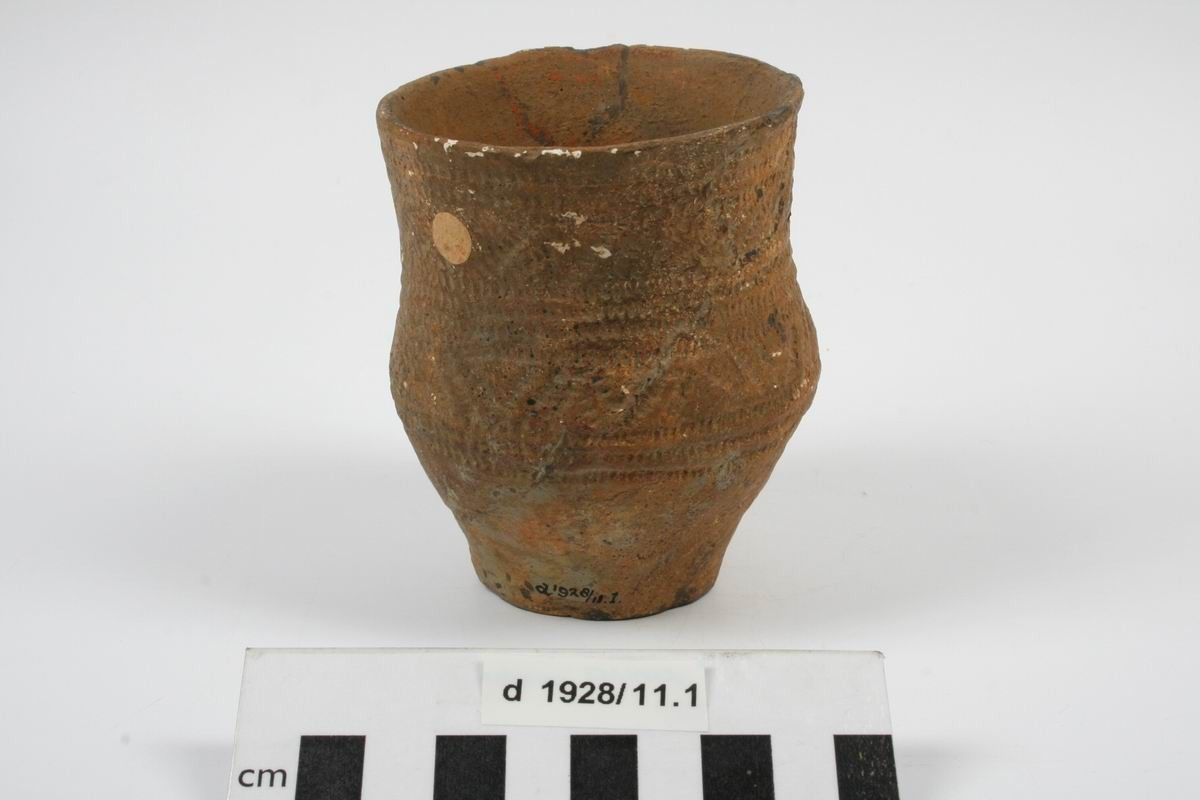
Bell Beaker discovered in Gammelke
