= Noord Deurningen =

- village
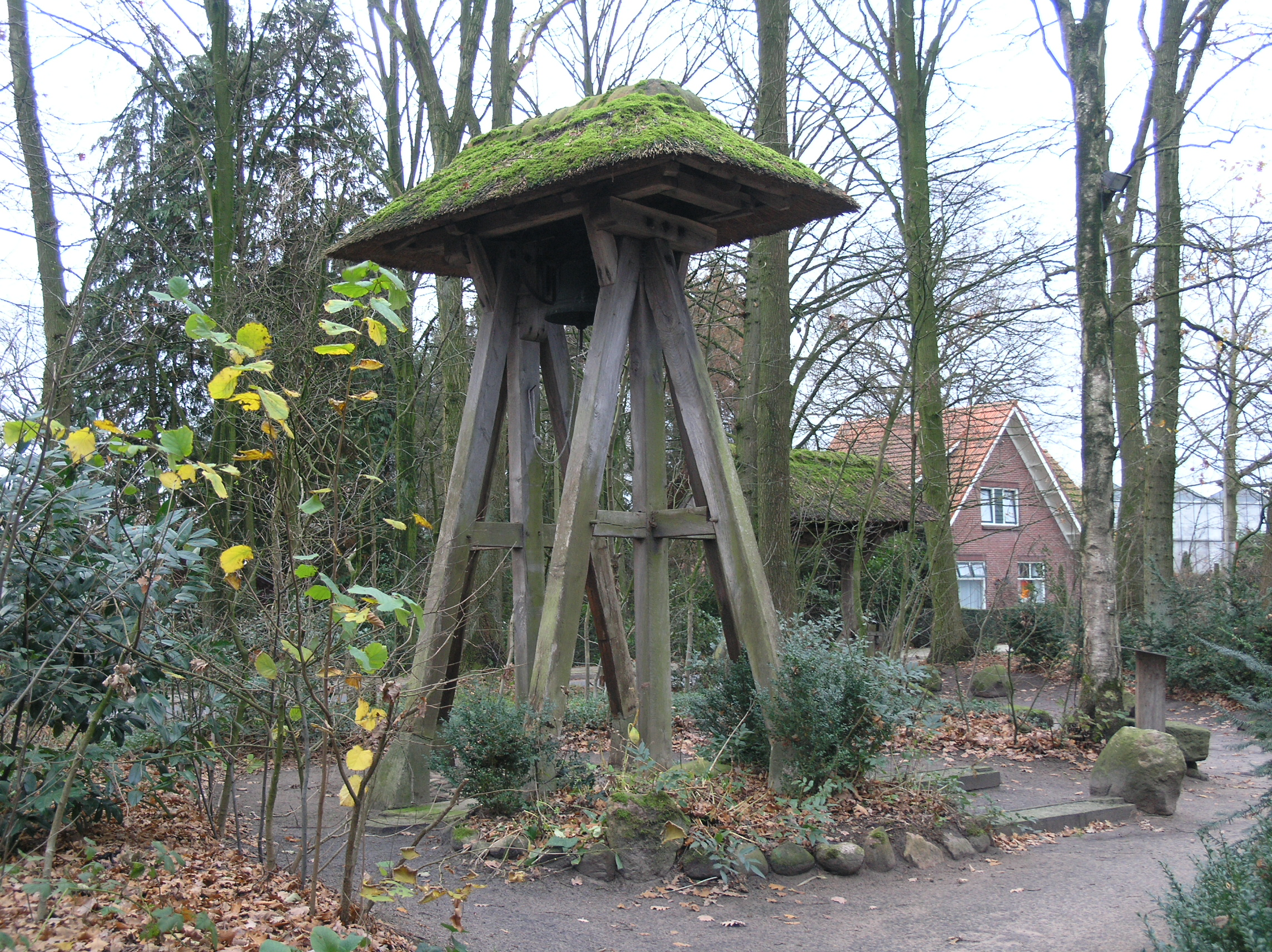
- Bell tower in Noord Deurningen

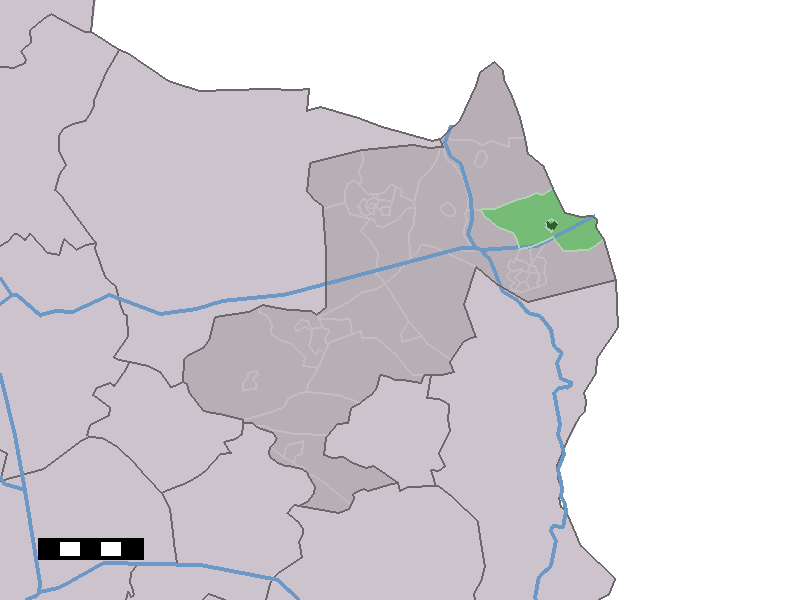
- The town centre (dark green) and the statistical district (light green) of Noord Deurningen in the municipality of Dinkelland.

- Location in the Netherlands Noord Deurningen (Netherlands)
- Coordinates: 52°23′49″N 7°1′31″E
- Country: Netherlands
- Province: Overijssel
- Municipality: Dinkelland

Area
  - Total: 11.03 km^{2} (4.26 sq mi)
- Elevation: 19 m (62 ft)

Population
  - Total: 1,070
  - Density: 97.0/km^{2} (251/sq mi)
- Demonym: Noord-Deurningers
- Time zone: UTC+1 (CET)
  - Summer (DST): UTC+2 (CEST)
- Postal code: 7591
- Dialing code: 074

Noord Deurningen is a village in the Dutch province of Overijssel. It is a part of the municipality of Dinkelland, and lies about 11 km northeast of Oldenzaal.

== Overview ==
It was first mentioned between 1337 and 1339 as 'Nortdorningen', and means 'the northern Deurningen', Deurningen and Noord Deurningen are separate places in Twente, some twenty kilometers apart on the map.

In the 17th century the havezate Noorddeurningen was built near the village. In 1875, Franciscan nuns from Thuine in Germany established an orphanage in the estate, and renamed the estate St.-Nicolaasgesticht. In 1840, Noord Deuningen was home to 722 people.

== Gallery ==
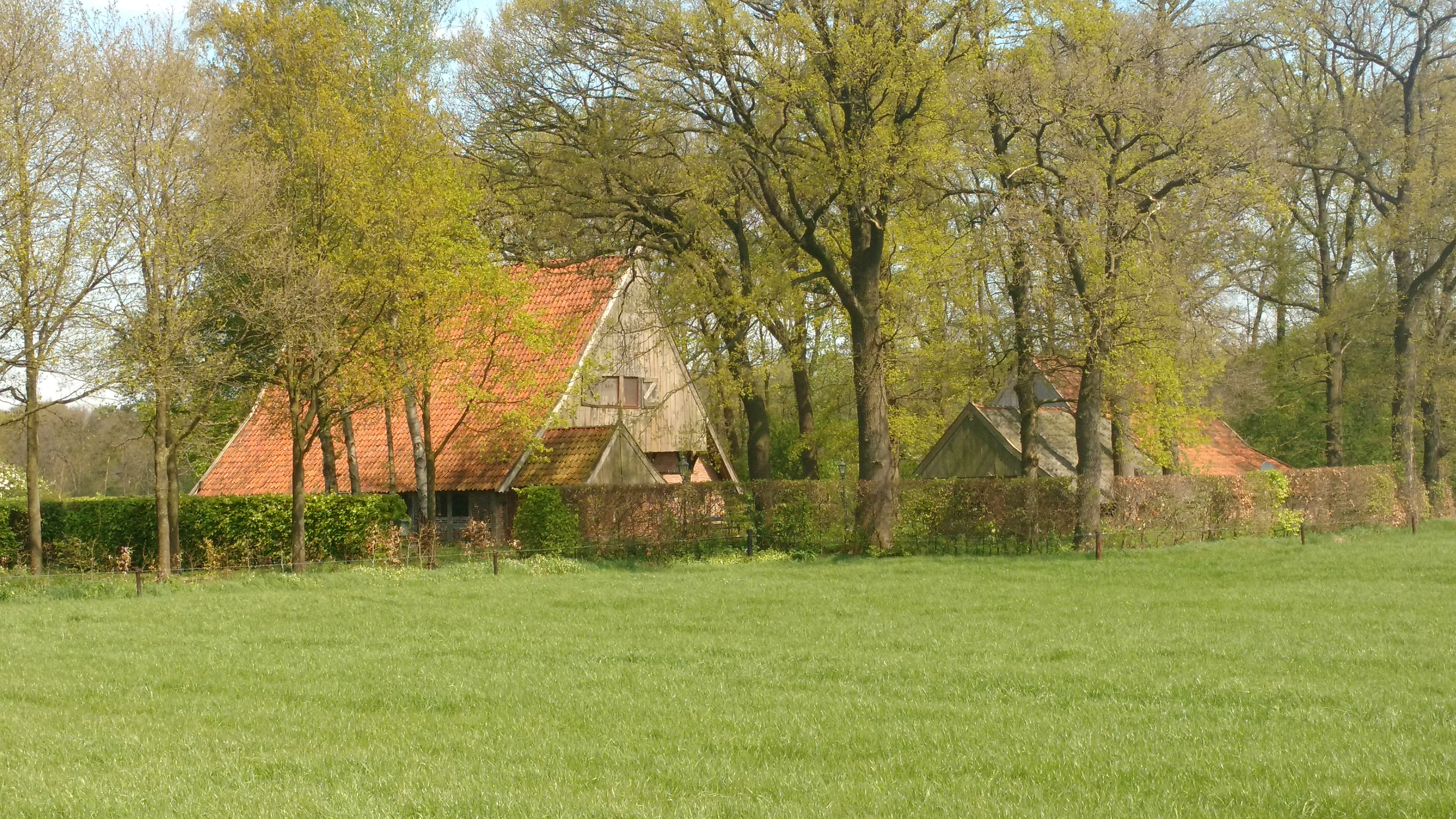
Farm in Noord Deurningen

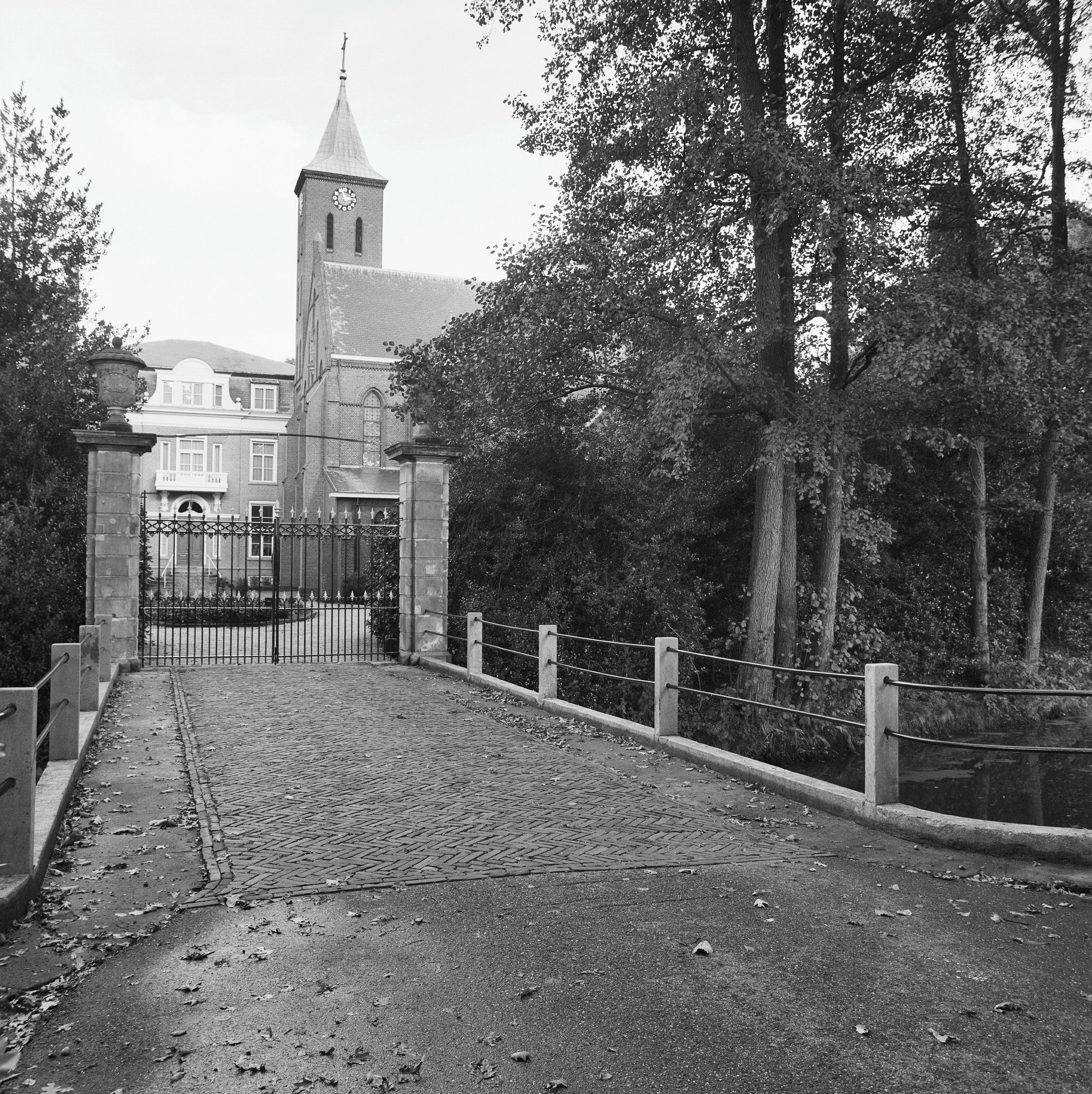
Monastery and church

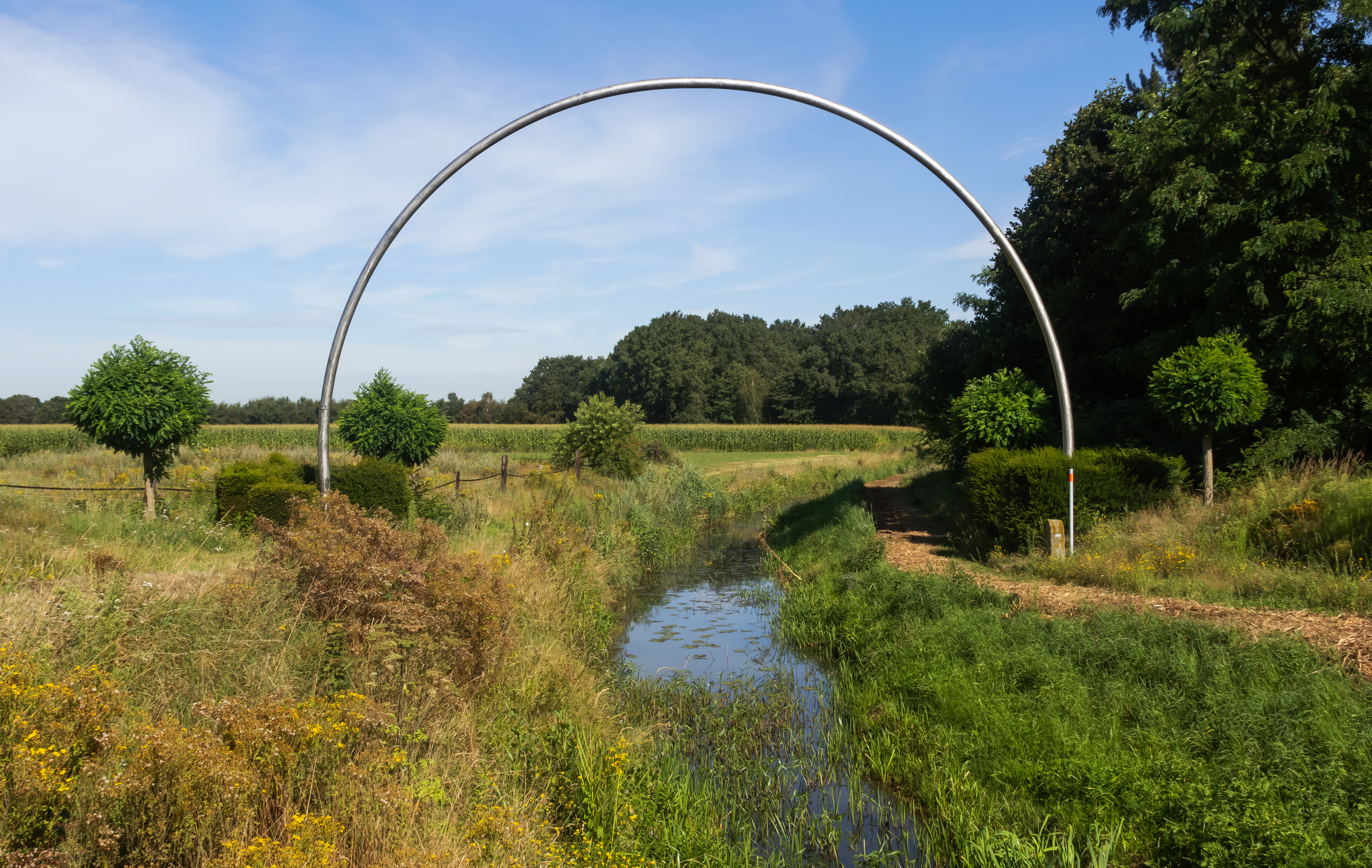
Art on the border with Germany

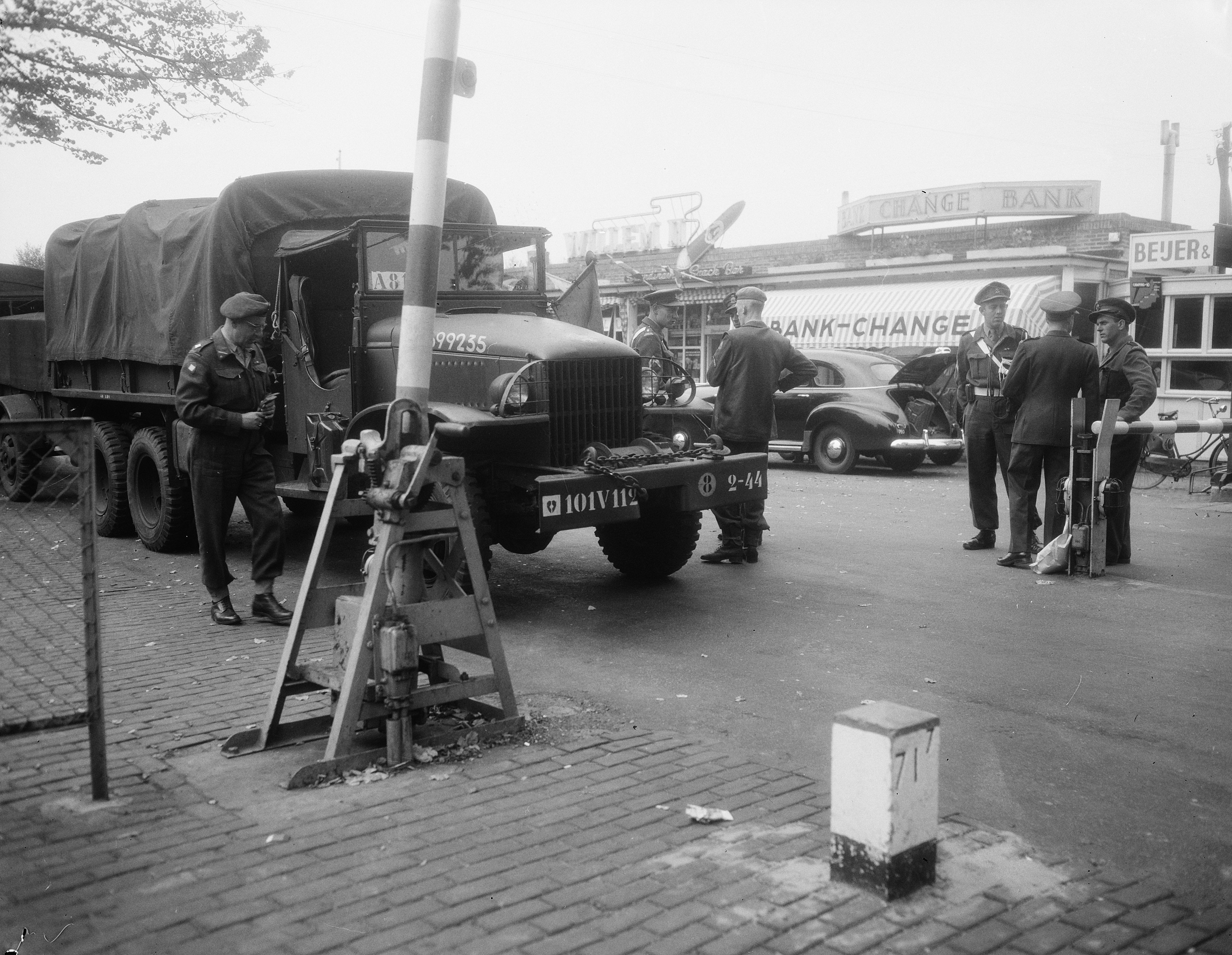
Dutch army moves into Germany (for a joint exercise) (1954)
