= Breklenkamp =

- Hamlet
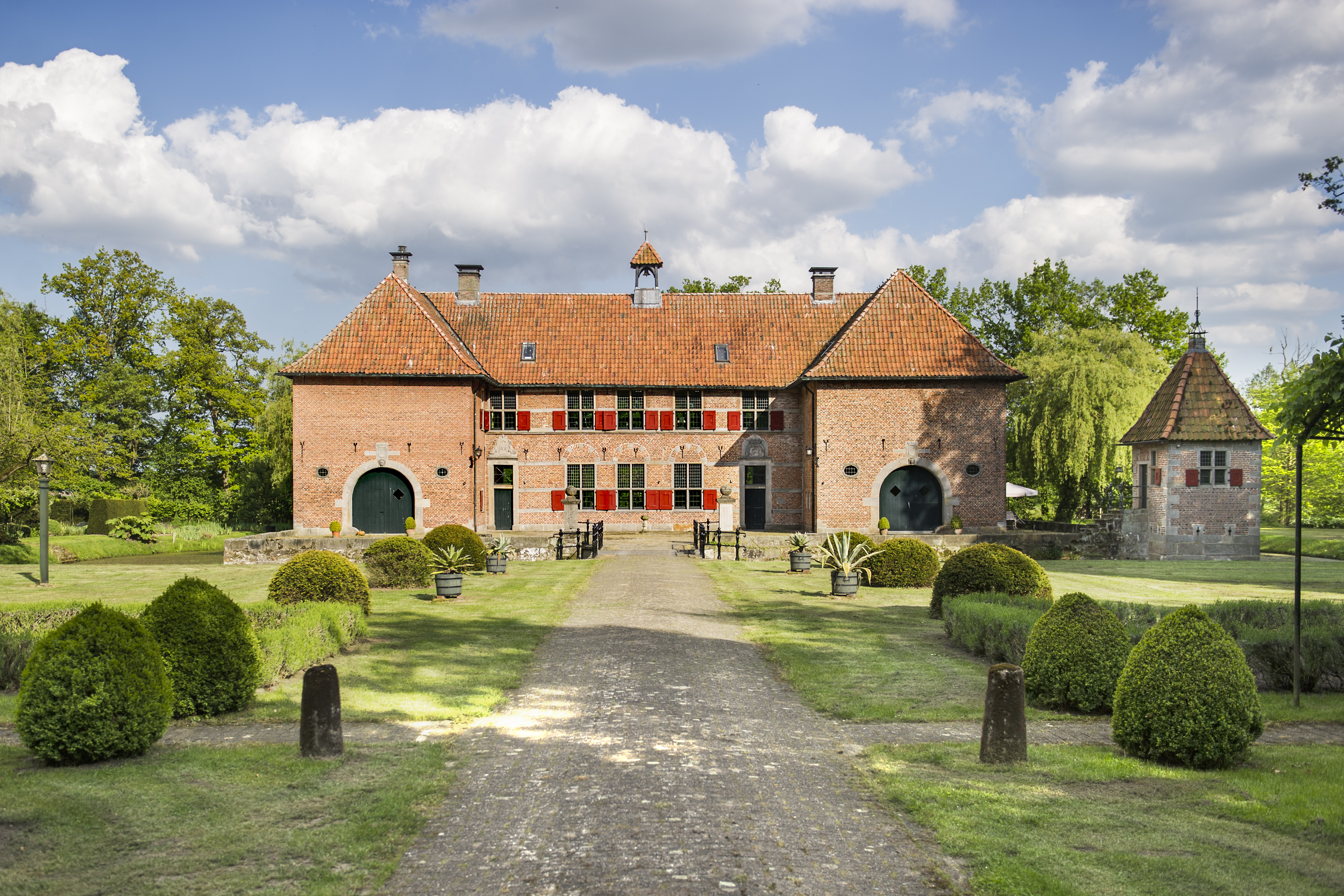
- Huis te Brecklenkamp

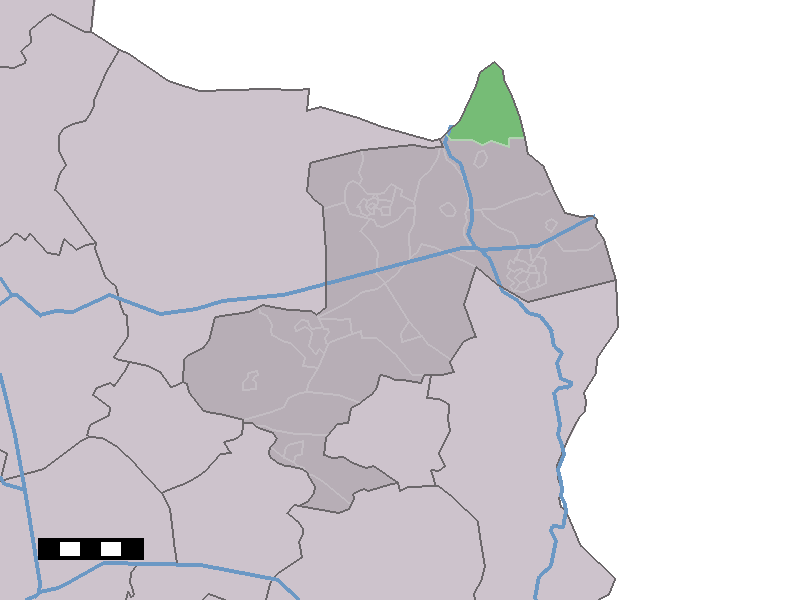
- Breklenkamp in the municipality of Dinkelland.

- Location in the Netherlands Breklenkamp (Netherlands)
- Coordinates: 52°27′7″N 6°59′54″E
- Country: Netherlands
- Province: Overijssel
- Municipality: Dinkelland

Area
  - Total: 8.56 km^{2} (3.31 sq mi)
- Elevation: 19 m (62 ft)

Population (2021)
  - Total: 185
  - Density: 21.6/km^{2} (56.0/sq mi)
- Time zone: UTC+1 (CET)
  - Summer (DST): UTC+2 (CEST)
- Postal code: 7635
- Dialing code: 0541

Breklenkamp is a hamlet in the Dutch province of Overijssel. It is a part of the municipality of Dinkelland, and lies about 16 km north of Oldenzaal.

It was first mentioned in the late-10th century as Brakkinghem, and means "settlement of Brakko (person)". In 1840, it was home to 257 people.

Huis te Brecklenkamp is a havezate which was built in the 1630s. The current layout dates from 1844. In 1990, it became a youth hostel, but has become private property in 1990.
