= Dinkelland =

- Municipality
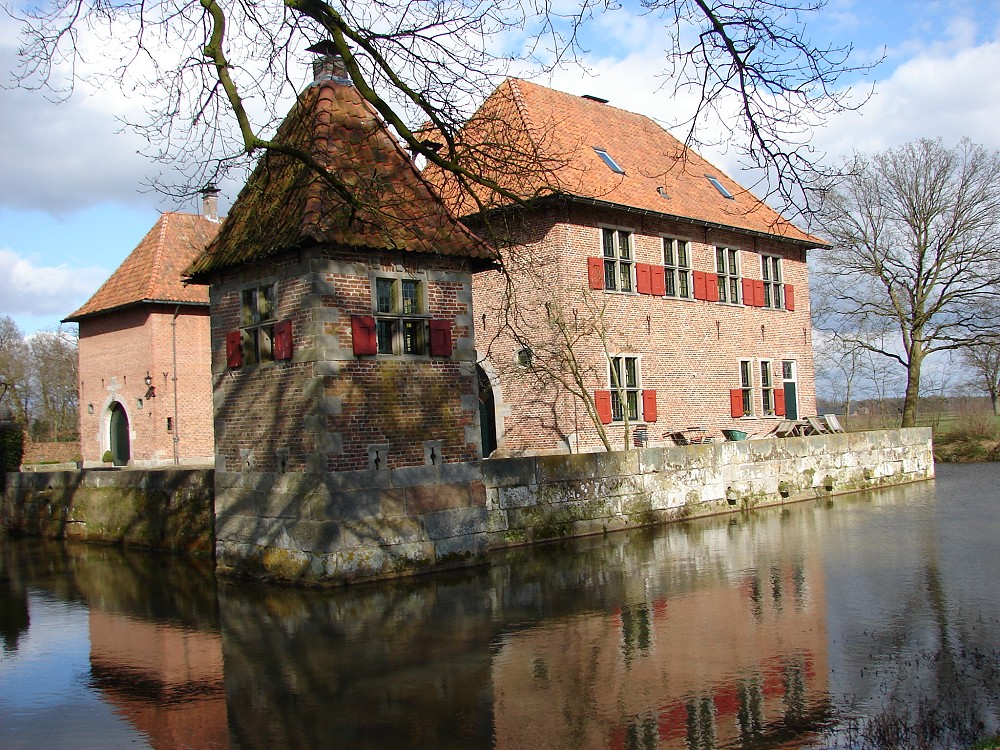
- Castle in Dinkelland

- Flag Coat of arms

- Location in Overijssel
- Coordinates: 52°22′N 7°0′E
- Country: Netherlands
- Province: Overijssel

Government
  - Body: Municipal council
  - Acting Mayor: John Joosten (VVD)

Area
  - Total: 176.83 km^{2} (68.27 sq mi)
  - Land: 175.71 km^{2} (67.84 sq mi)
  - Water: 1.12 km^{2} (0.43 sq mi)
- Elevation: 26 m (85 ft)

Population (January 2021)
  - Total: 26,606
  - Density: 151/km^{2} (390/sq mi)
- Time zone: UTC+1 (CET)
  - Summer (DST): UTC+2 (CEST)
- Postcode: Parts of 7500 and 7600 ranges
- Area code: 0541, 074
- Website: www.dinkelland.nl

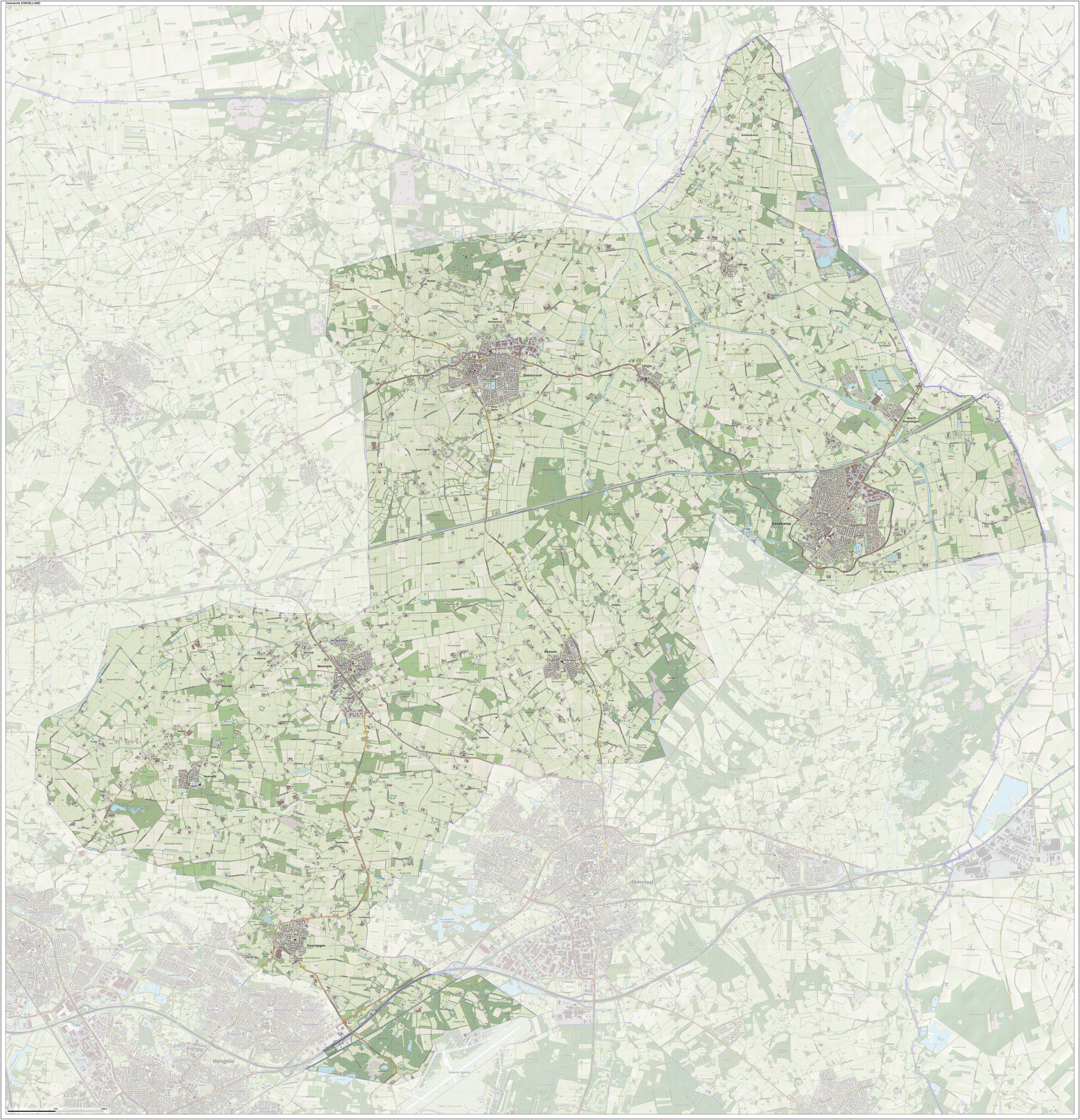
Map of the municipality of Dinkelland, June 2015

Dinkelland (Dutch pronunciation: [ˈdɪŋkəllɑnt]) is a municipality in the eastern Netherlands. For a short time it was known as Denekamp (one of its component towns) until it was renamed in 2002.

== Population centres ==
- Breklenkamp
- Denekamp
- Deurningen
- Dulder
- Gammelke
- Groot Agelo
- Het Stift
- Klein Agelo
- Lattrop
- Lemselo
- Noord Deurningen
- Noordijk
- Nutter
- Ootmarsum
- Oud Ootmarsum
- Rossum
- Saasveld
- Tilligte
- Volthe
- Weerselo

== Notable people ==
- Johan Jongkind (1819 in Lattrop – 1891) a painter and printmaker
- Theo Budde (1889 in Ootmarsum – 1959) a watchmaker, jeweler, antique dealer and poet
- Ton Schulten (1938 in Ootmarsum – 2025) a painter who mainly painted landscapes
- Roméo Dallaire (born 1946 in Denekamp) a Canadian humanitarian, author, statesman and retired senator and general
- Marcha (born 1956 in Lattrop) a singer and TV presenter, took part in the 1987 Eurovision Song Contest
- Han Polman (born 1963 in Ootmarsum) a politician
- Tanja Nijmeijer (born 1978 in Denekamp) a Dutch former guerrilla fighter in Colombia and English teacher

=== Sport ===
- Felix von Heijden (1890 in Weerselo – 1982) a footballer team bronze medallist at the 1920 Summer Olympics; & Mayor of Rosmalen 1923–1955
- Hennie Kuiper (born 1949 in Denekamp) a former professional road racing cyclist, gold medallist at the 1972 Summer Olympics
- Jos Lansink (born 1961 in Weerselo) an equestrian, team gold medallist at the 1992 Summer Olympics
- Marieke Westerhof (born 1974 in Denekamp) a retired rower, team silver medallist at the 2000 Summer Olympics
- Elles Leferink (born 1976 in Weerselo) a volleyball player, competed at the 1996 Summer Olympics
