= Tilligte =

- Village
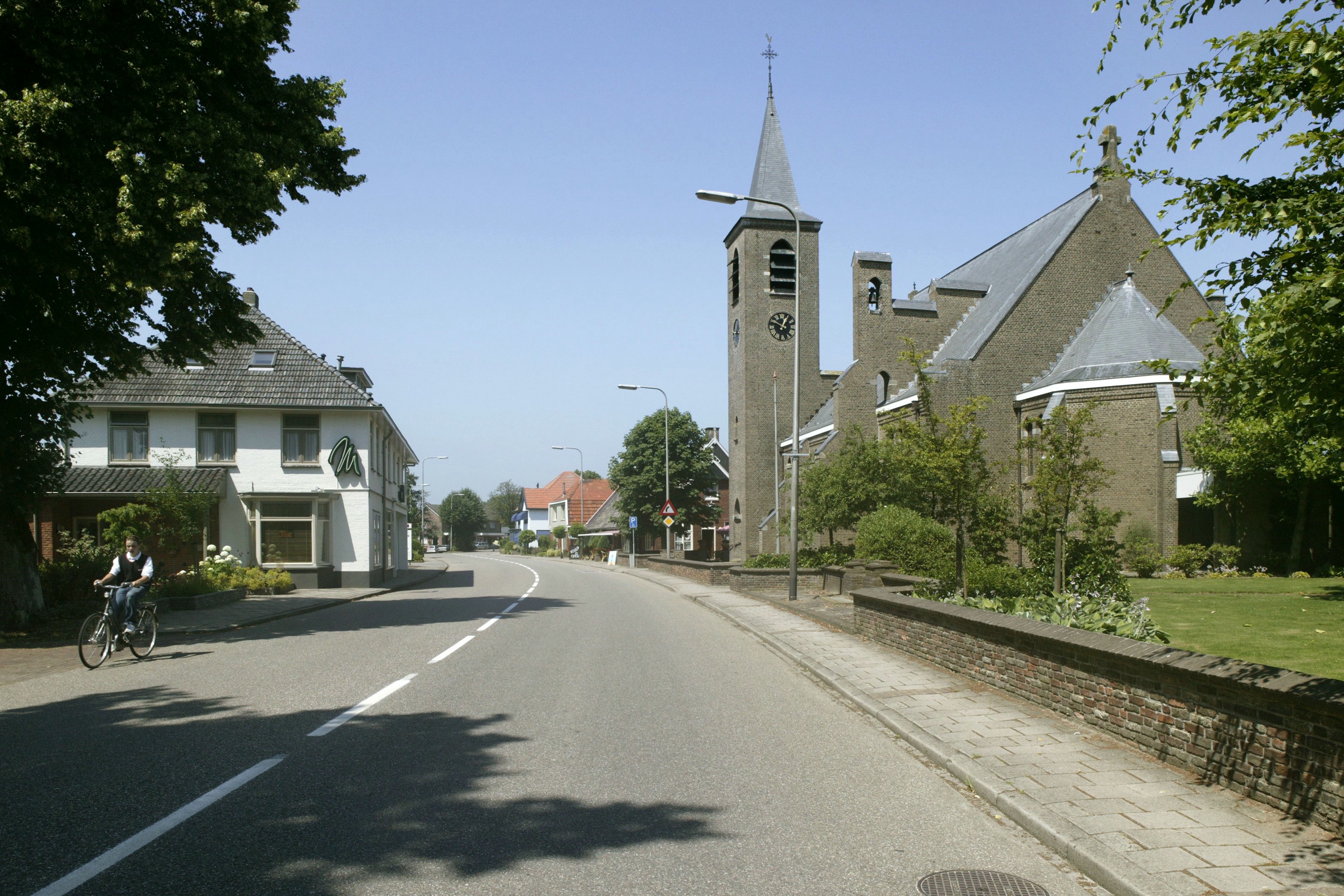
- Simon and Judas Church
- Nickname: Waterpönskesdoarp (Water Bellies Village)
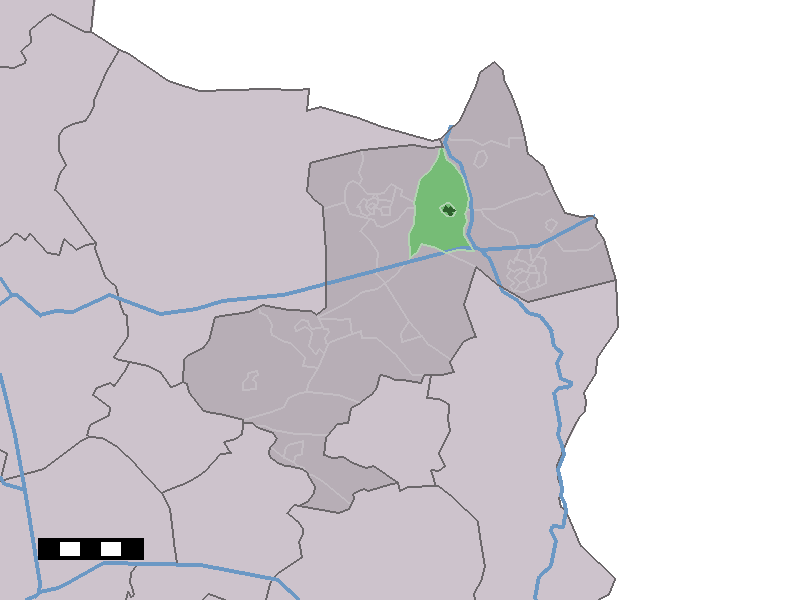
- The town centre (dark green) and the statistical district (light green) of Tilligte in the municipality of Dinkelland.

- Location in the Netherlands Tilligte (Netherlands)
- Coordinates: 52°24′18″N 6°57′5″E
- Country: Netherlands
- Province: Overijssel
- Municipality: Dinkelland

Area
  - Total: 10.12 km^{2} (3.91 sq mi)
- Elevation: 21 m (69 ft)

Population (2021)
  - Total: 770
  - Density: 76/km^{2} (200/sq mi)
- Demonym: Tilligtenaren
- Time zone: UTC+1 (CET)
  - Summer (DST): UTC+2 (CEST)
- Postal code: 7634
- Dialing code: 0541

Tilligte is a rural village in the Dutch province of Overijssel. It is part of the municipality of Dinkelland and is situated approximately 10 km north of Oldenzaal.

IFirst mentioned in 1295 as Tilgde, which translates to "place where young oaks grow", by 1840 it had a population of 463.

The windmill in the village is called 'Westerveld Möl'. The church is called 'Simon en Judaskerk'. Another point of interest is the water inlet 't Schuivenhuisje at the Kanaal Almelo-Nordhorn.

== Gallery ==
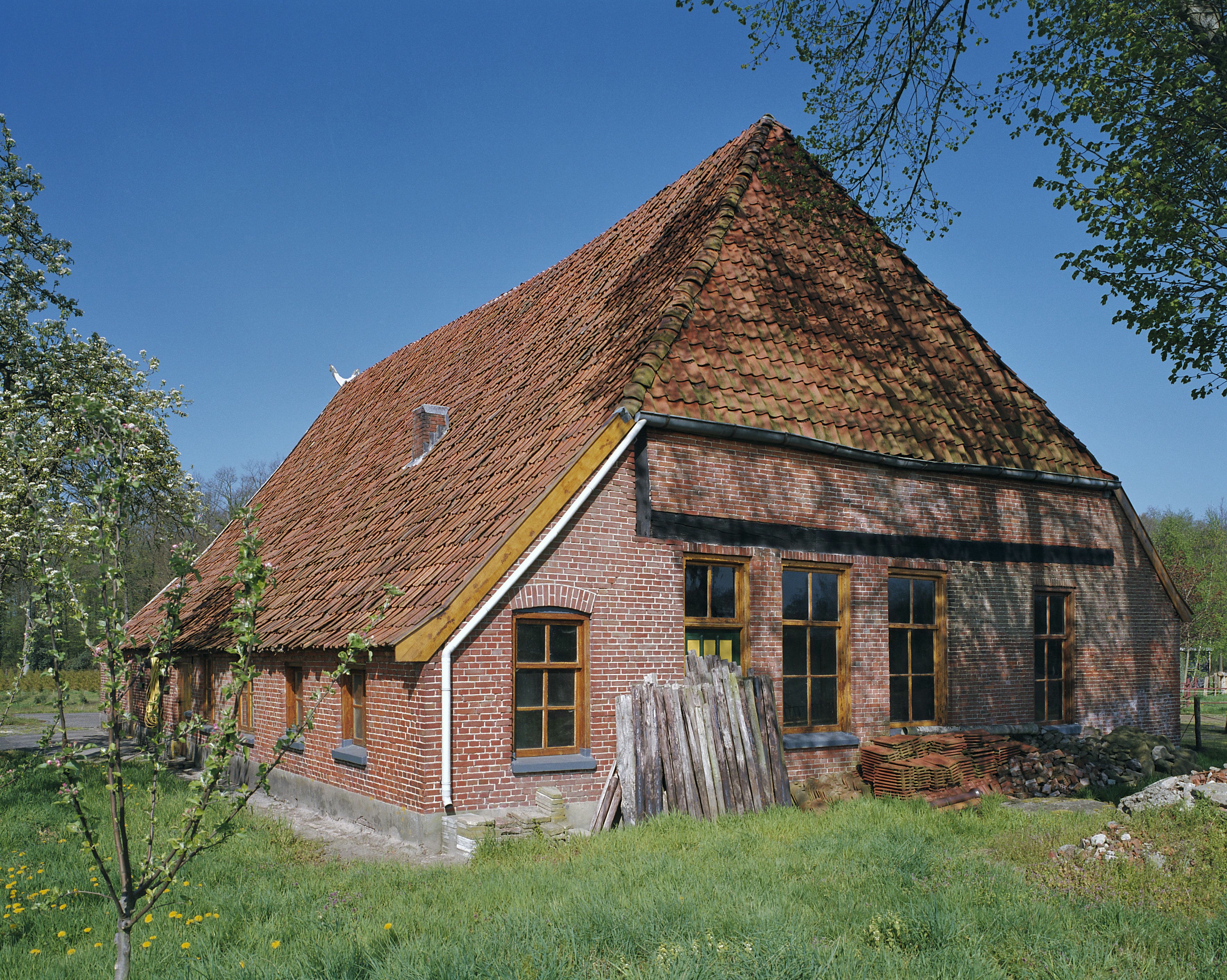
Architectural monument

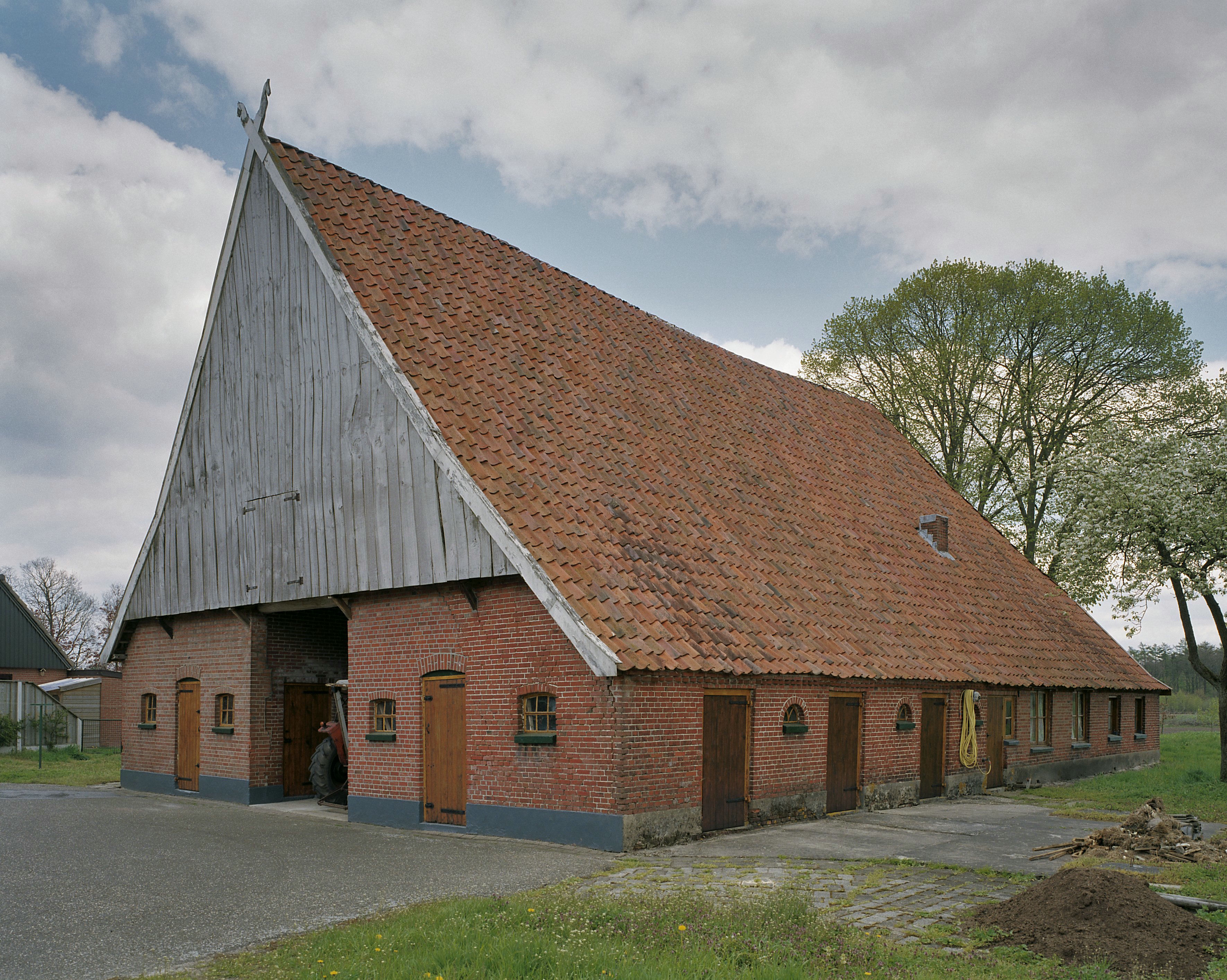
Architectural monument

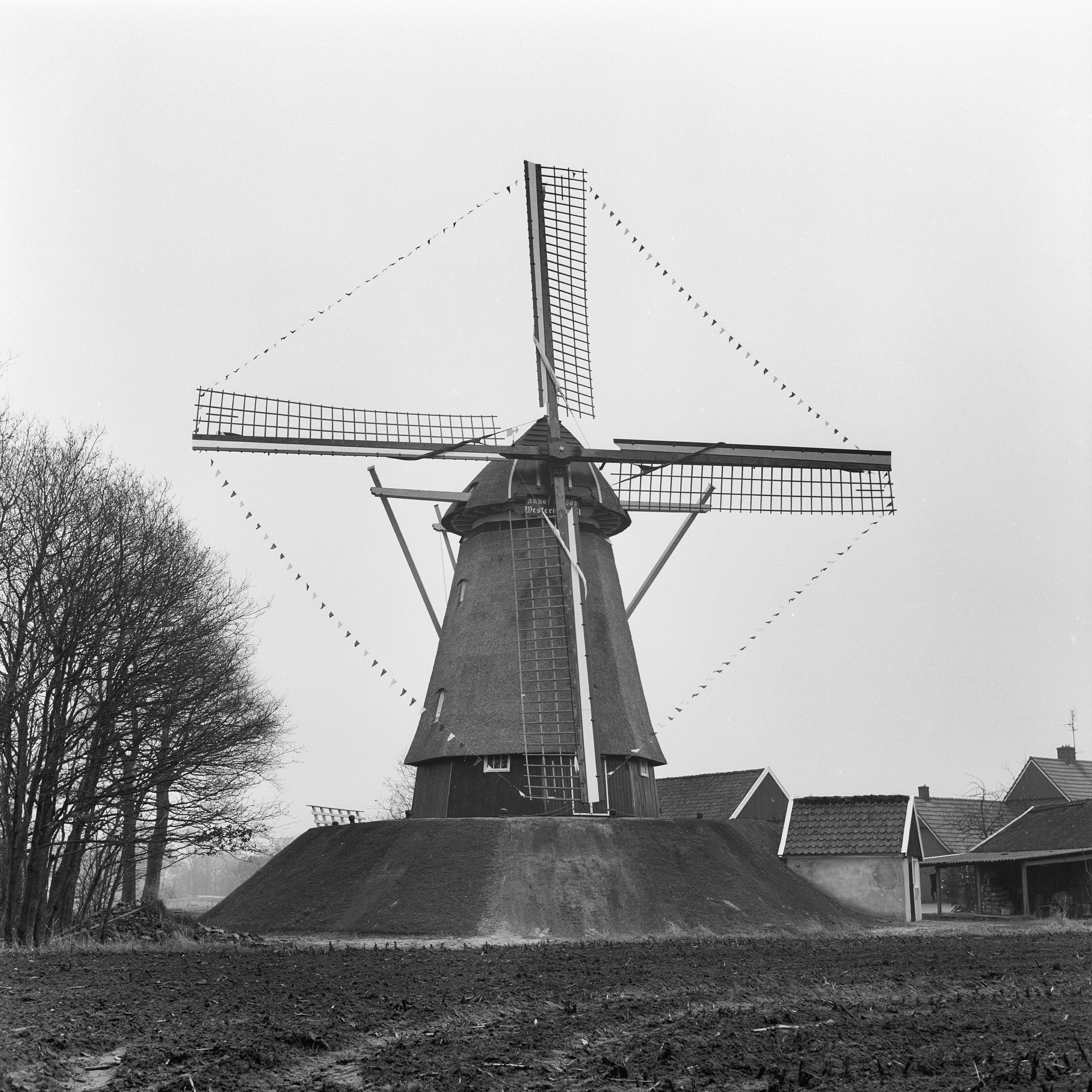
Westerveld Möl

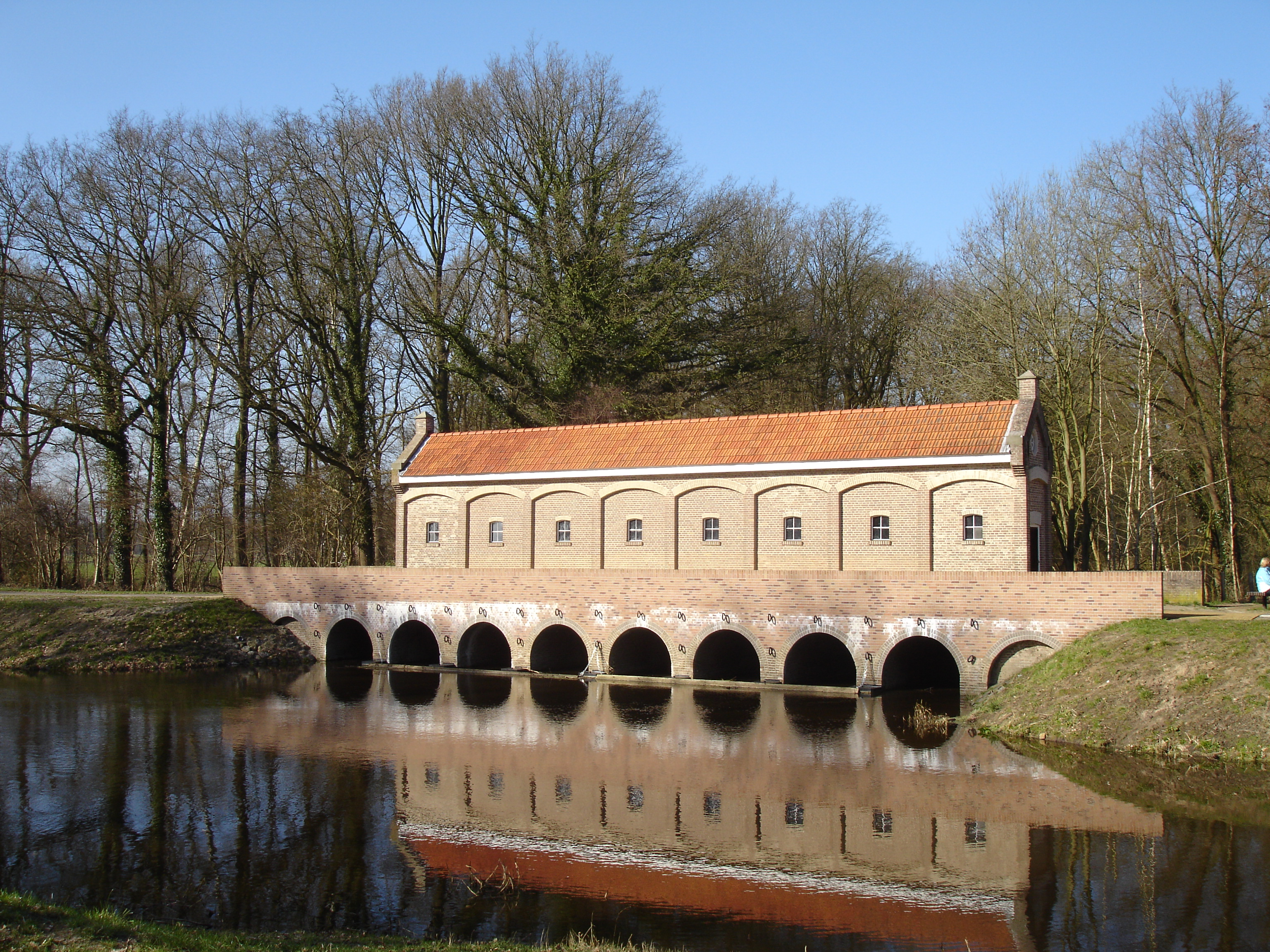
Schuivenhuisje
