= Volthe =

- Hamlet
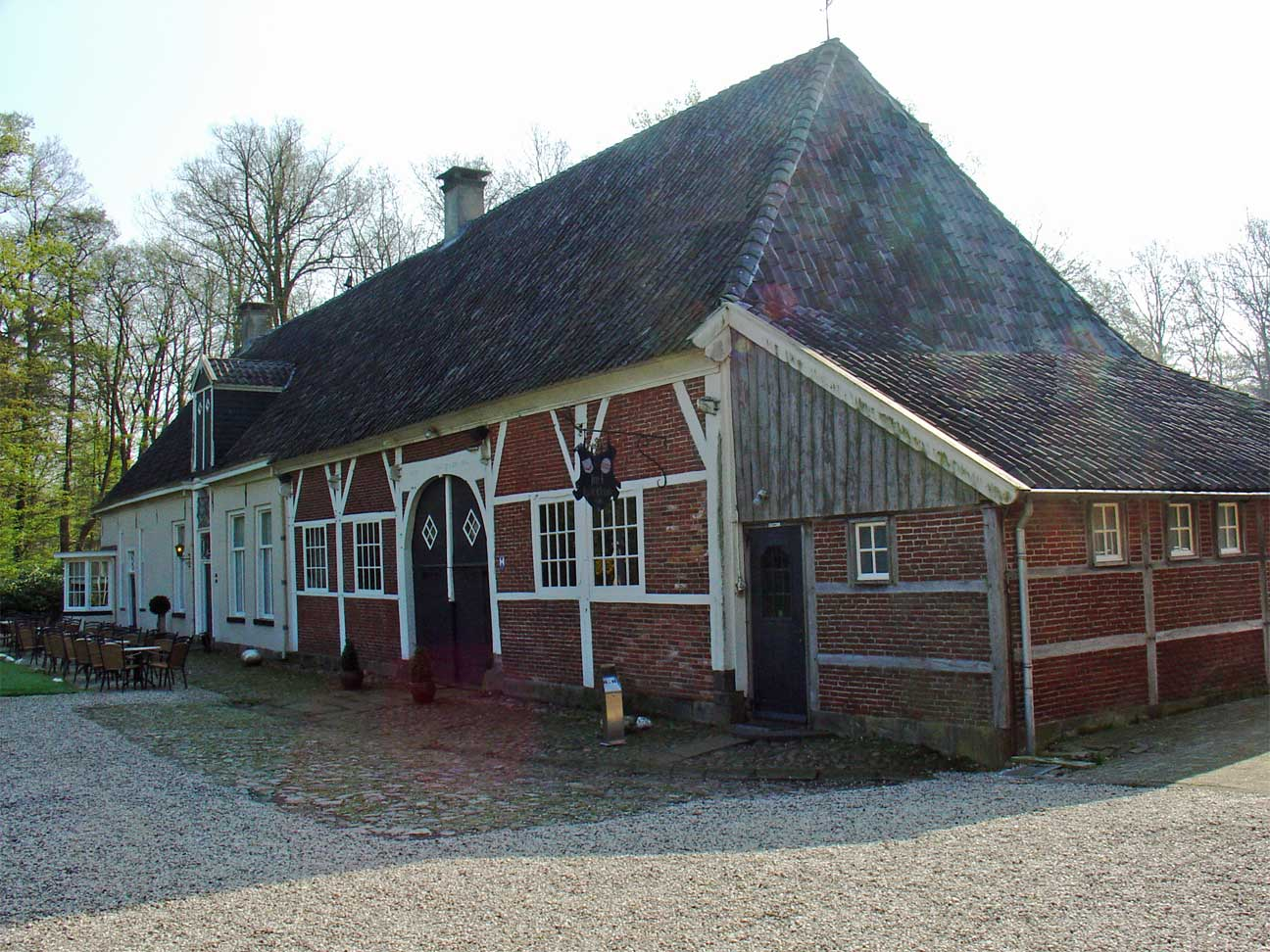
- Havezathe het Everlo in Volthe

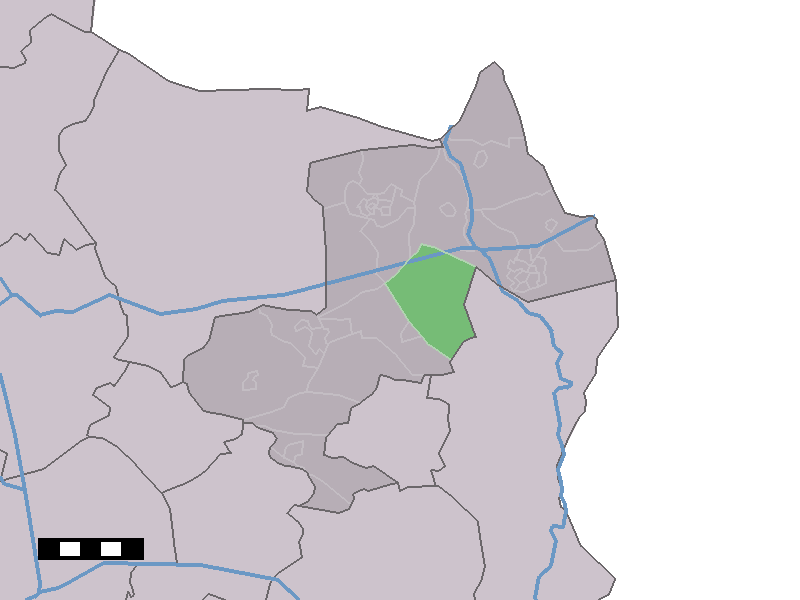
- Volthe in the municipality of Dinkelland.

- Location in the Netherlands Volthe (Netherlands)
- Coordinates: 52°22′15″N 6°56′47″E
- Country: Netherlands
- Province: Overijssel
- Municipality: Dinkelland
- Elevation: 25 m (82 ft)
- Demonym(s): Volthenaren, Öllieböarde
- Time zone: UTC+1 (CET)
  - Summer (DST): UTC+2 (CEST)
- Postal code: 7596
- Dialing code: 0541

Volthe is a hamlet in the Dutch province of Overijssel. It is a part of the municipality of Dinkelland, and lies about 6 km north of Oldenzaal.

Volthe is not a statistical entity, and the postal authorities have placed it under Rossum. It was first mentioned in the late-10th century as Uuluht. The etymology is unclear. In 1840, it was home to 542. Nowadays, it consists of about 200 houses.

It is a rural area with spread out farms and houses, some of them in the timber framed style of the traditional Low German house.

A fortified house, het Everlo, serves as a starting point for walks to the nearby nature reserve Roderveld.

== Gallery ==
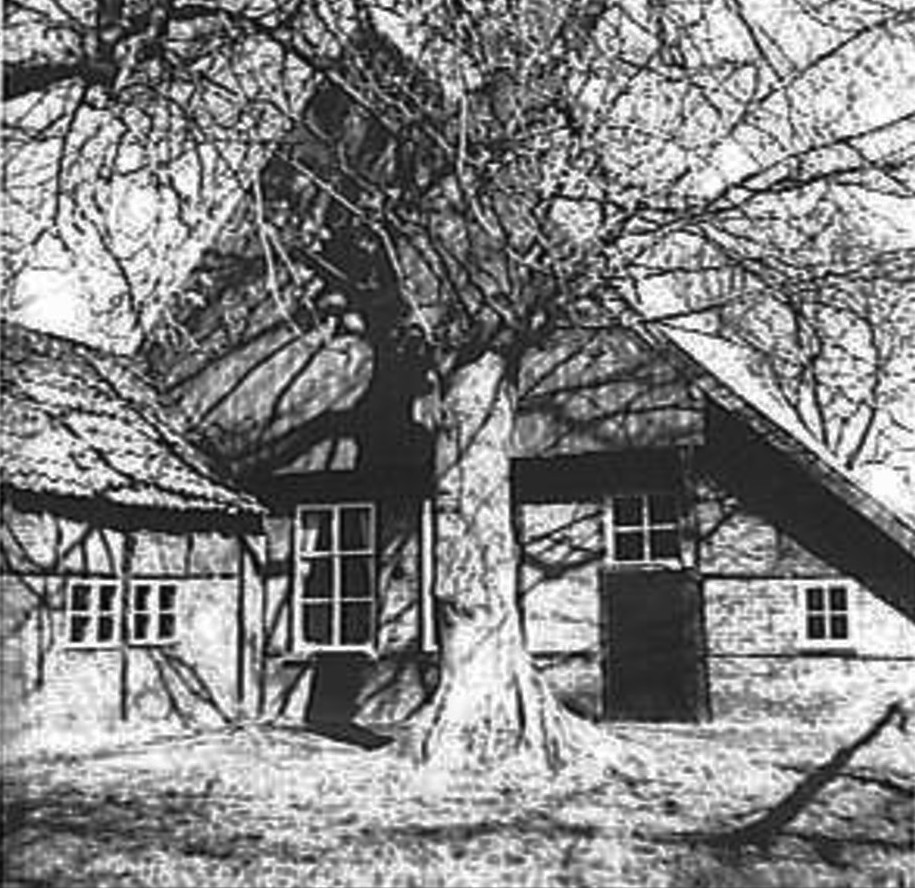
Traditional cottage

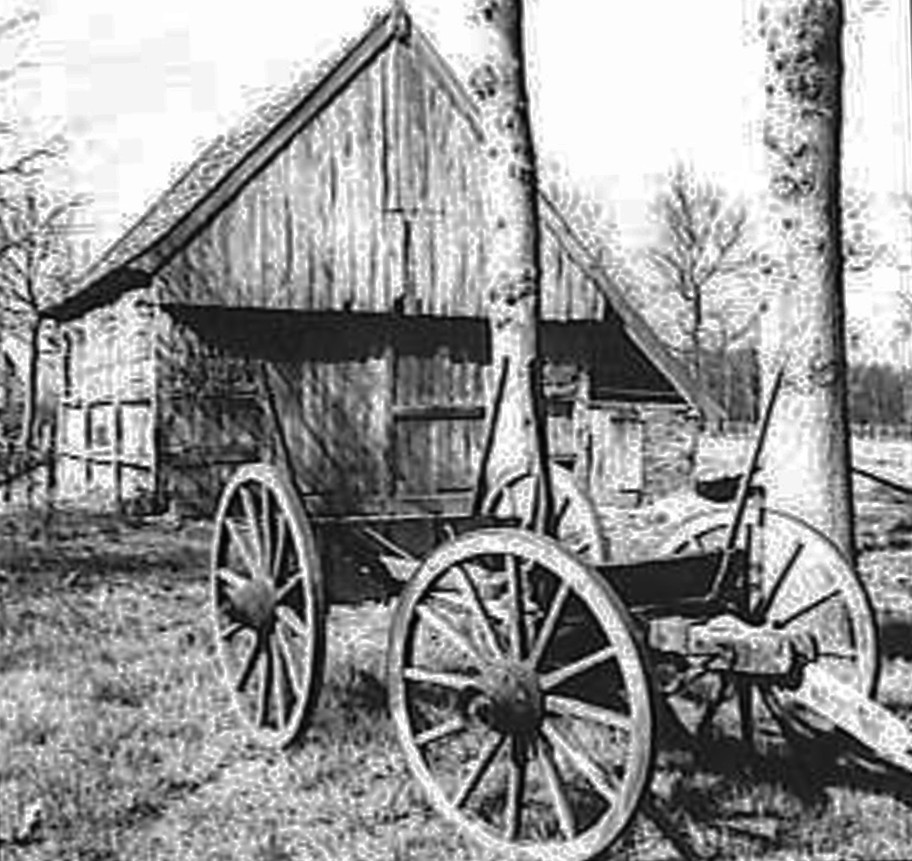
Barn with wagon

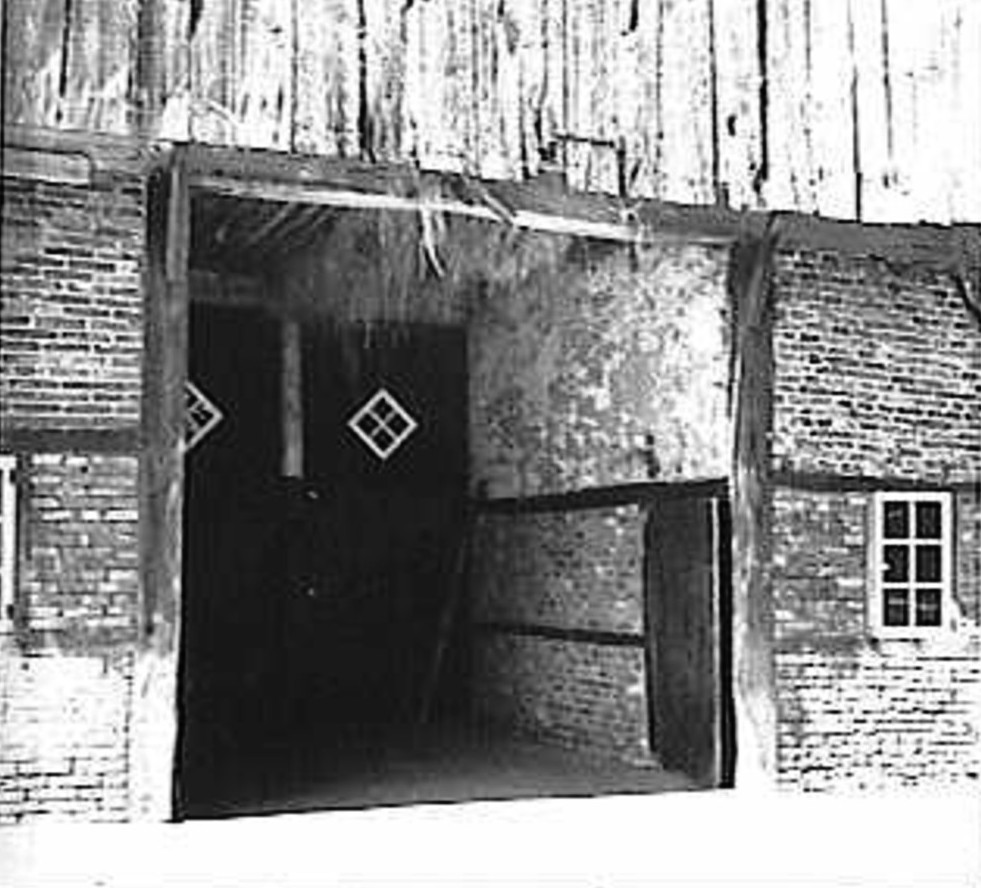
Shedded entrance of a barn
