= Oud Ootmarsum =

- hamlet
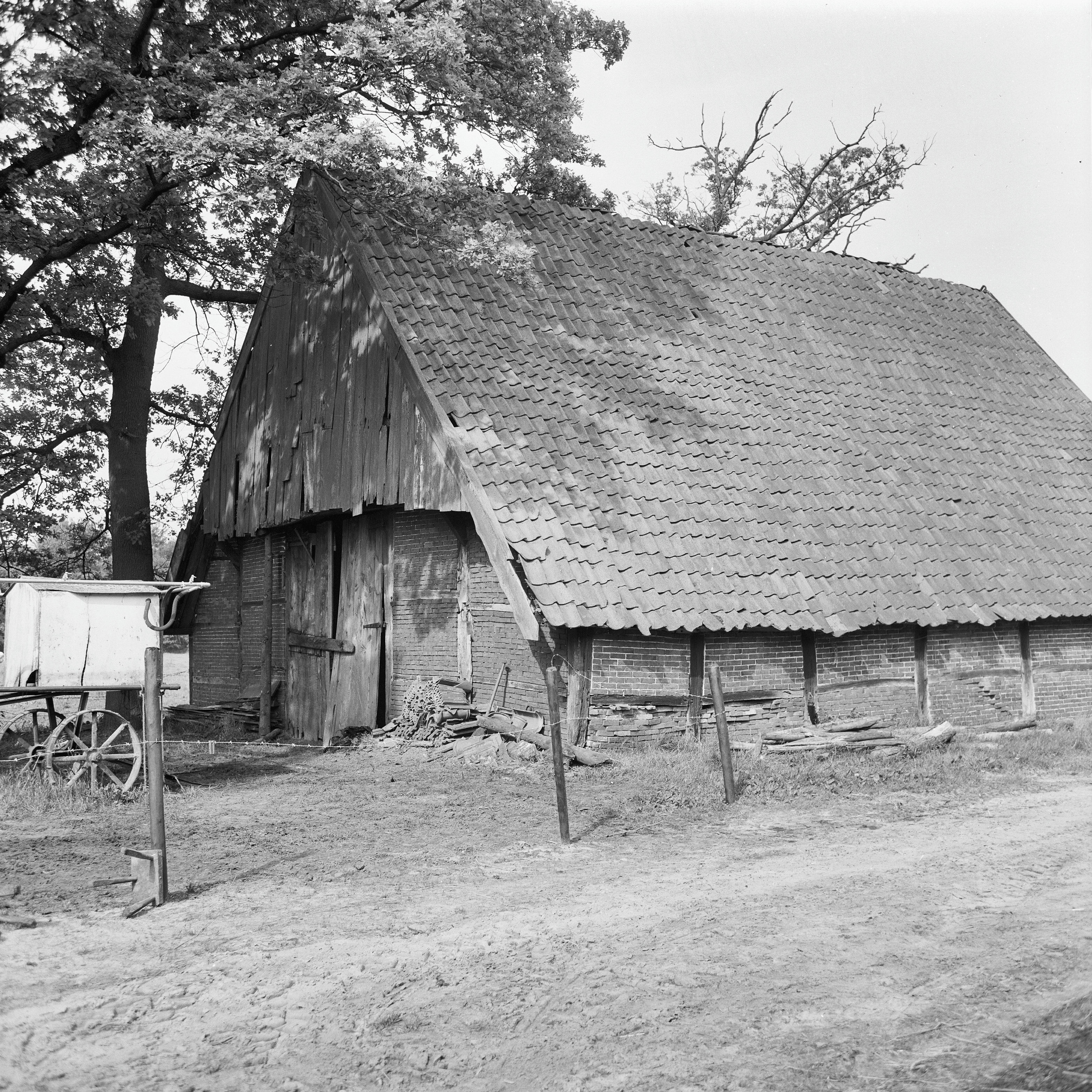
- Old style barn
- Nickname: Héénige Slépvént Land
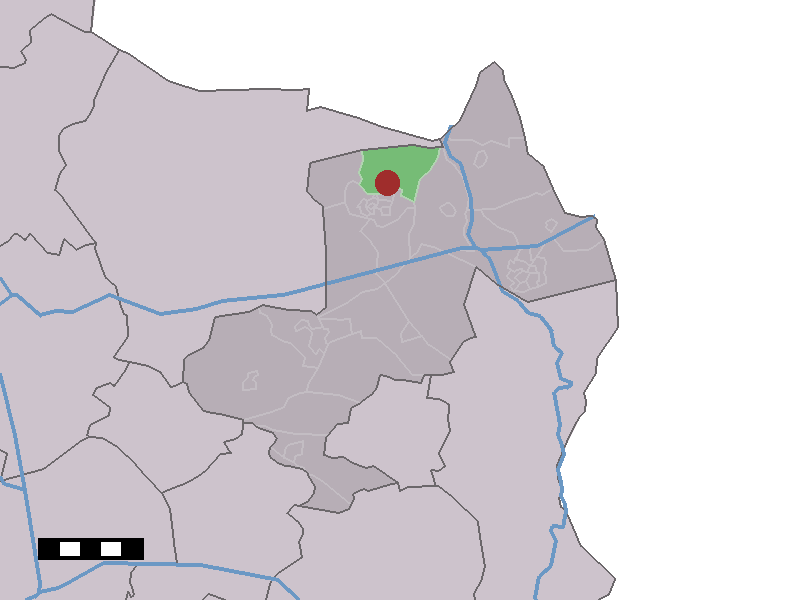
- The village (dark red) and the statistical district (light green) of Oud Ootmarsum in the municipality of Dinkelland.

- Location in the Netherlands Oud Ootmarsum (Netherlands)
- Coordinates: 52.4175°N 6.9079°E
- Country: Netherlands
- Province: Overijssel
- Municipality: Dinkelland

Area
  - Total: 7.48 km^{2} (2.89 sq mi)
- Elevation: 31 m (102 ft)

Population
  - Total: 320
  - Density: 43/km^{2} (110/sq mi)
- Demonym: Oud-Ootmarsumers
- Time zone: UTC+1 (CET)
  - Summer (DST): UTC+2 (CEST)
- Postal code: 7637
- Dialing code: 0541

Oud Ootmarsum is a hamlet in the Dutch province of Overijssel. It is a part of the municipality of Dinkelland, and lies about 12 km north of Oldenzaal and very close to Ootmarsum.

Oud Ootmarsum is a statistical entity and has its own postal code, however it is considered a hamlet. The hamlet is the predecessor of the city of Ootmarsum, and was first mentioned in 1384 as Olde Oetmarsum. In 1840, it was home to 245 people.

The partially timber-framed building style of barns and farmhouses here is closely related to the building style of the Low German house.

== Gallery ==
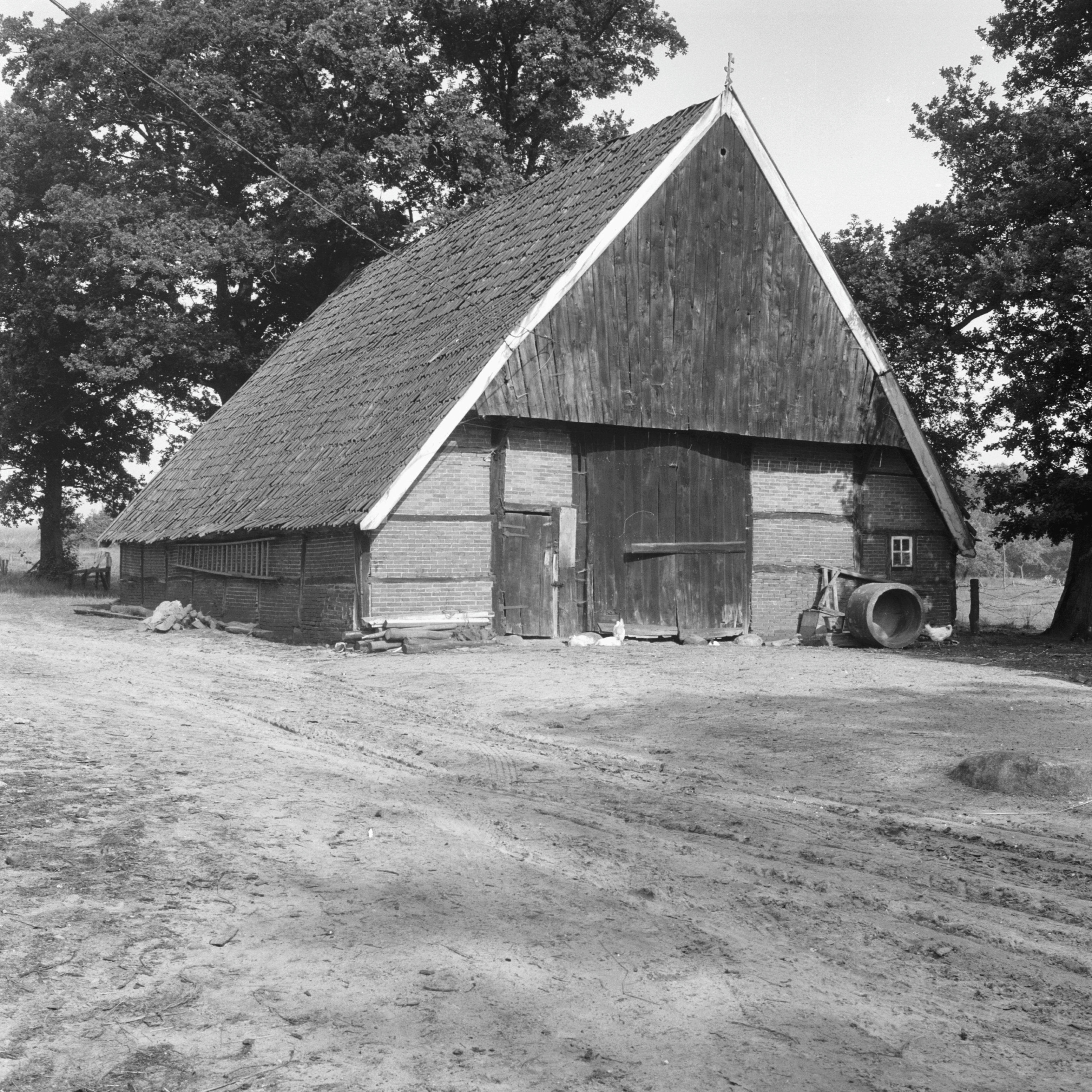
Old style barn

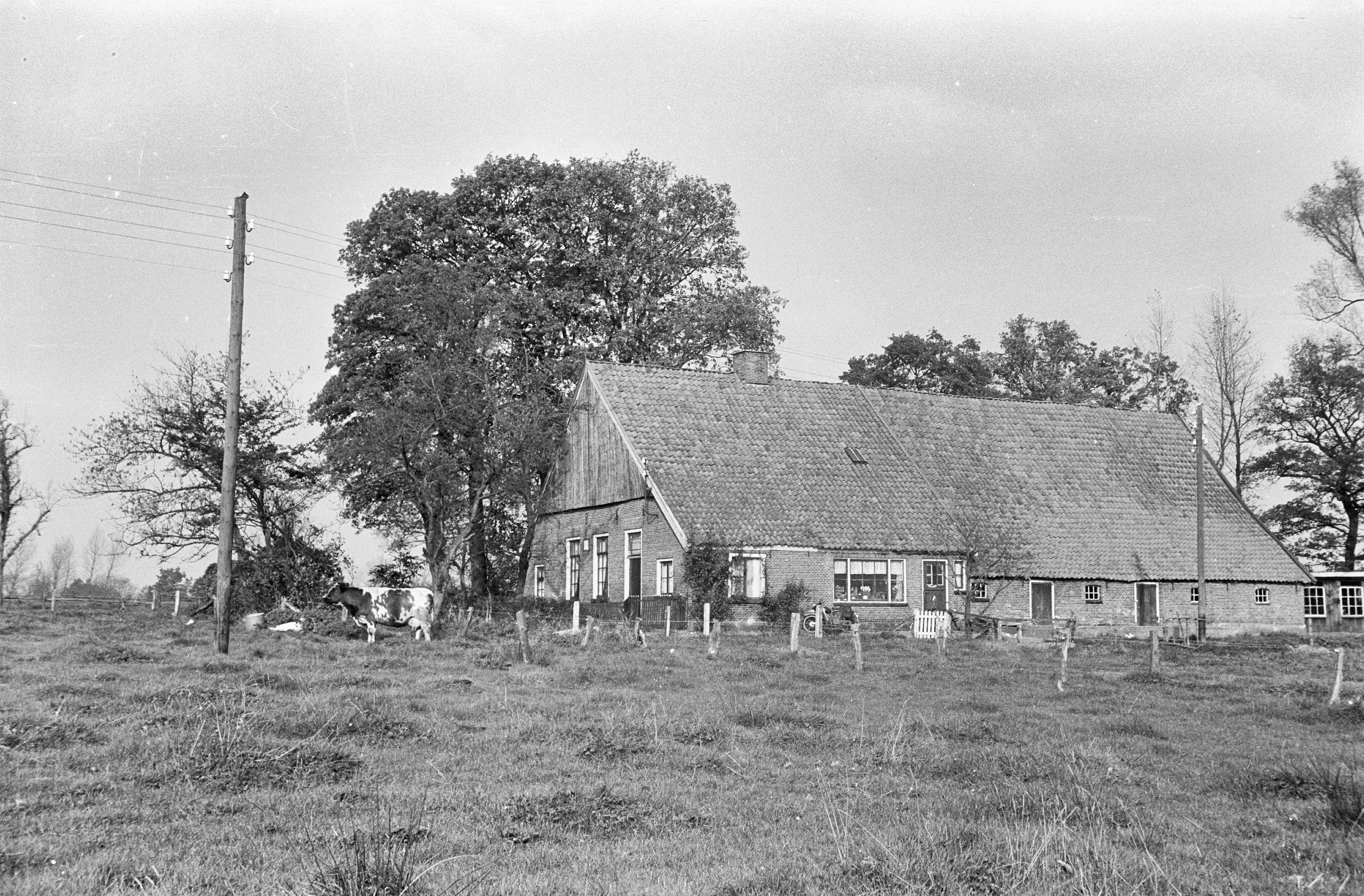
Old style farmhouse

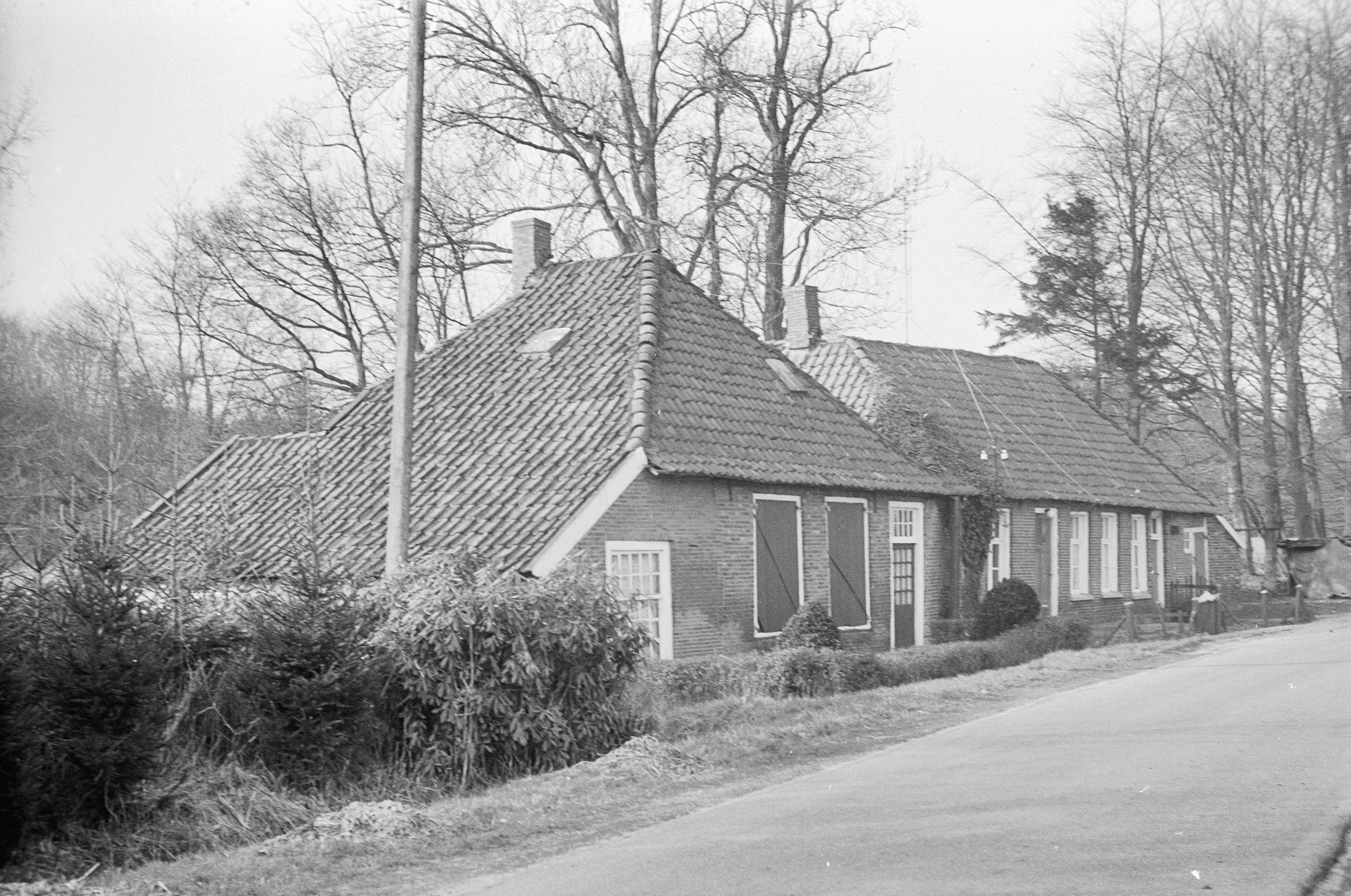
Former watermill
