= Saasveld =

- village
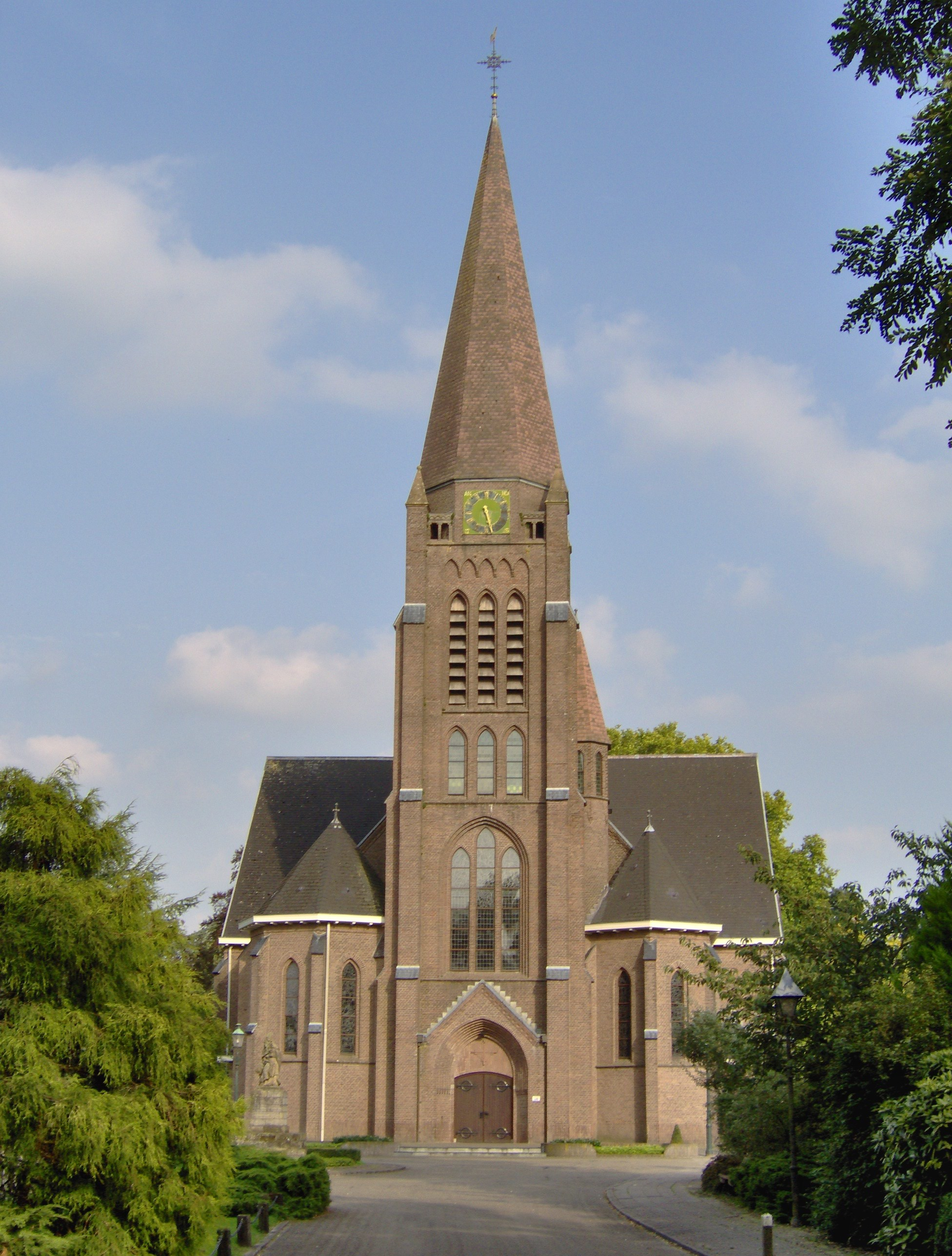
- Saint Plechelmus Church in Saasveld
- Nickname: Koffiedreenkers
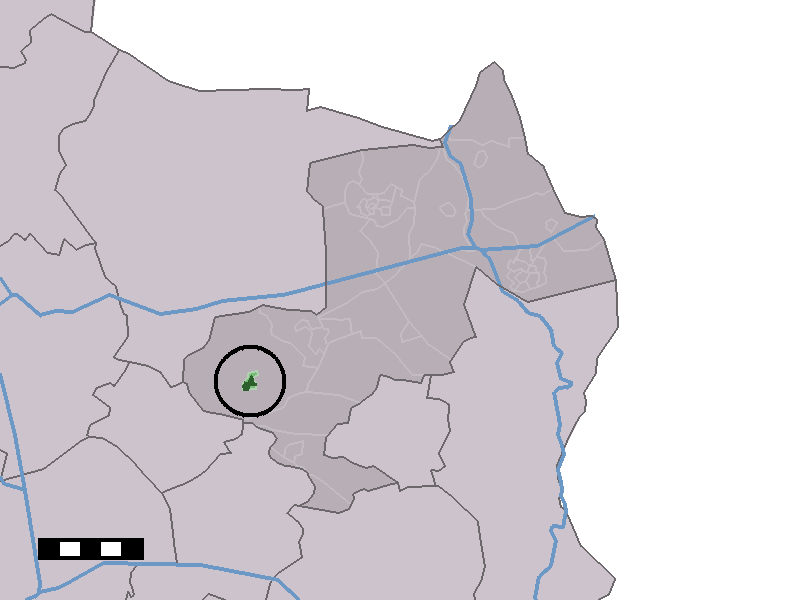
- The town centre (dark green) and the statistical district (light green) of Saasveld in the municipality of Dinkelland.

- Location in the Netherlands Saasveld (Netherlands)
- Coordinates: 52°19′52″N 6°48′23″E
- Country: Netherlands
- Province: Overijssel
- Municipality: Dinkelland

Area
  - Total: 21.98 km^{2} (8.49 sq mi)
- Elevation: 18 m (59 ft)

Population (2021)
  - Total: 1,700
  - Density: 77/km^{2} (200/sq mi)
- Demonym(s): Saasveldenaars, Saasvelders, Soaseler
- Time zone: UTC+1 (CET)
  - Summer (DST): UTC+2 (CEST)
- Postal code: 7597
- Dialing code: 074

Saasveld is a village in the Dutch province of Overijssel. It is a part of the municipality of Dinkelland, and lies about 7 km north of Hengelo.

== Overview ==
It was first mentioned in 1145 as Saterslo. The etymology is unclear. The castle Saterslo was first mentioned in 1361. It was surrounded by swaps and often raided the countryside. After the reformation, a clandestine church was constructed inside the castle. The castle was demolished in 1818, and a church was built in Saasveld. The current Saint Plechelmus Church dates from 1926, and is 46 metres (151 ft) tall. In 1870, the gristmill Soaseler Möl was constructed.

== Gallery ==
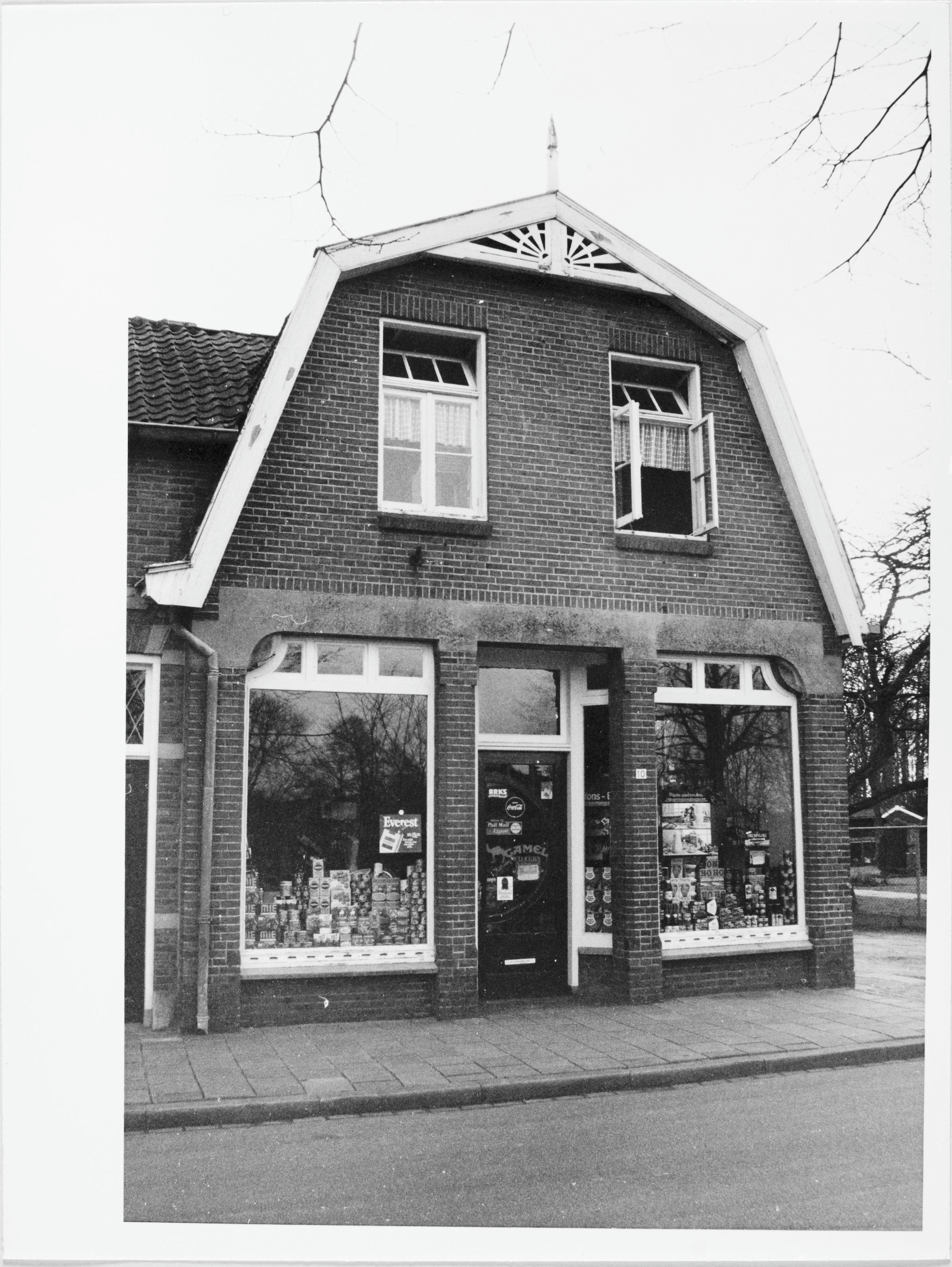
Village shop (1983)

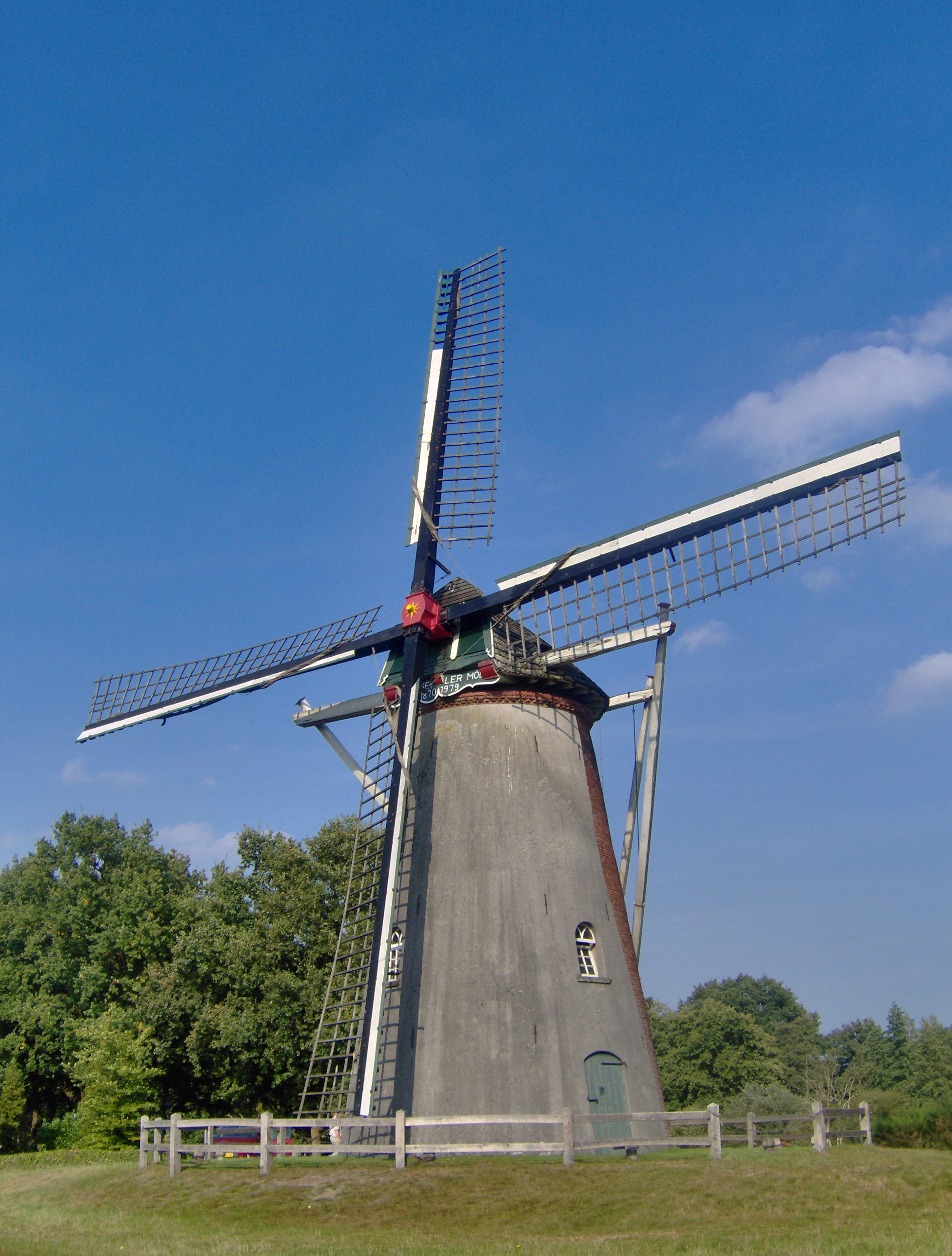
Windmill Soaseler Möl

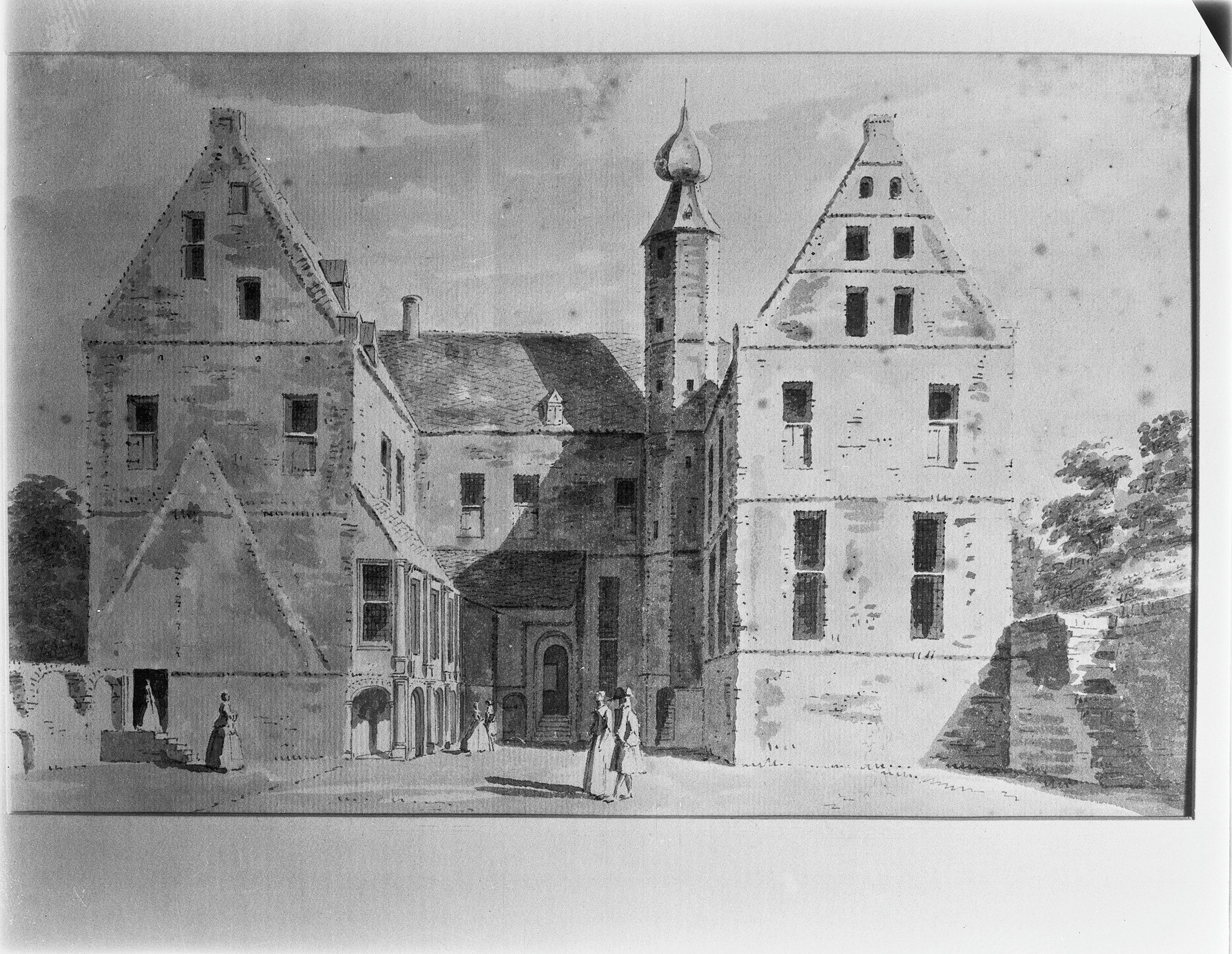
Drawing of Saterslo (1722-1748)
