= Nutter, Netherlands =

Nutter
- Hamlet
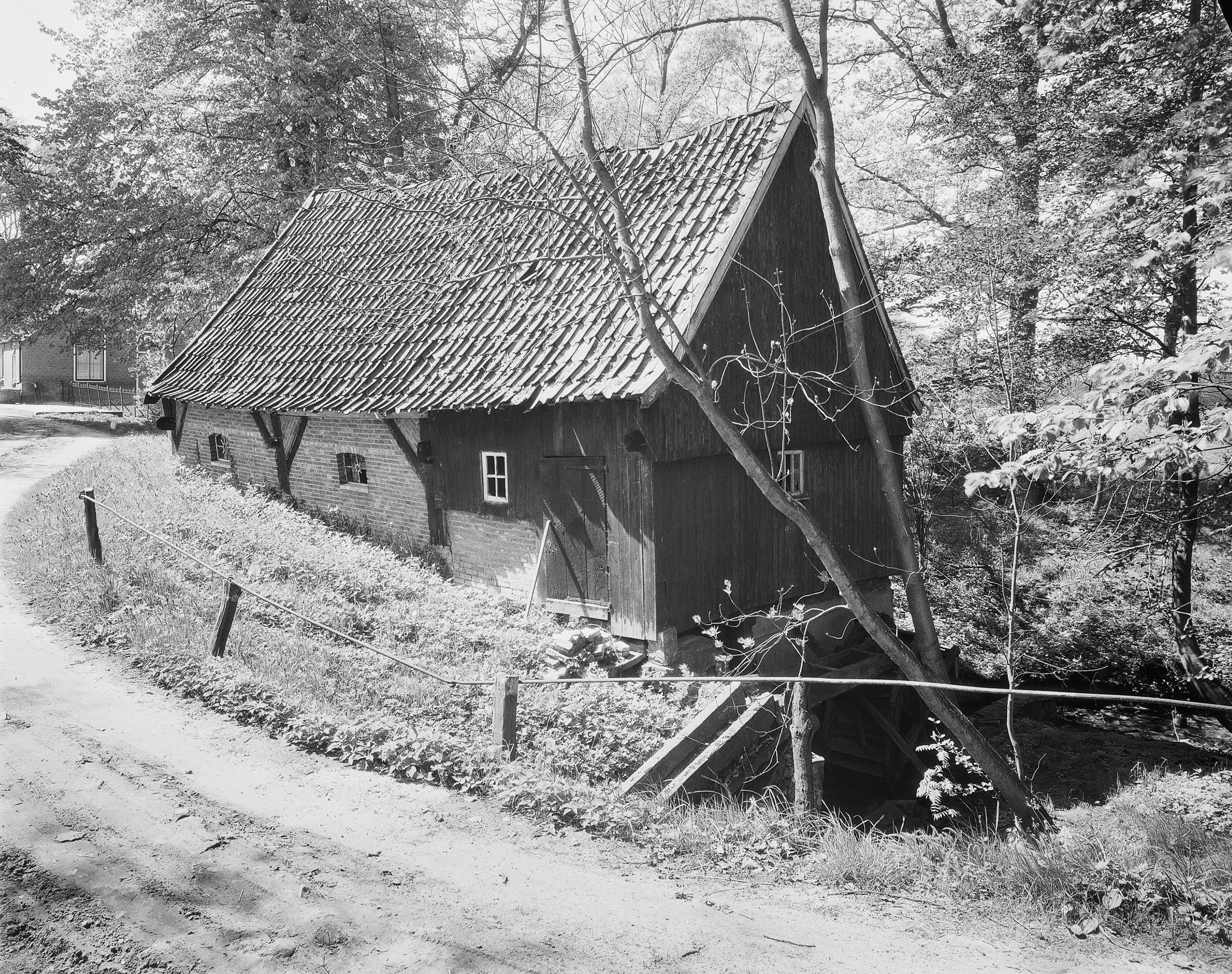
- Hazelbekke watermill

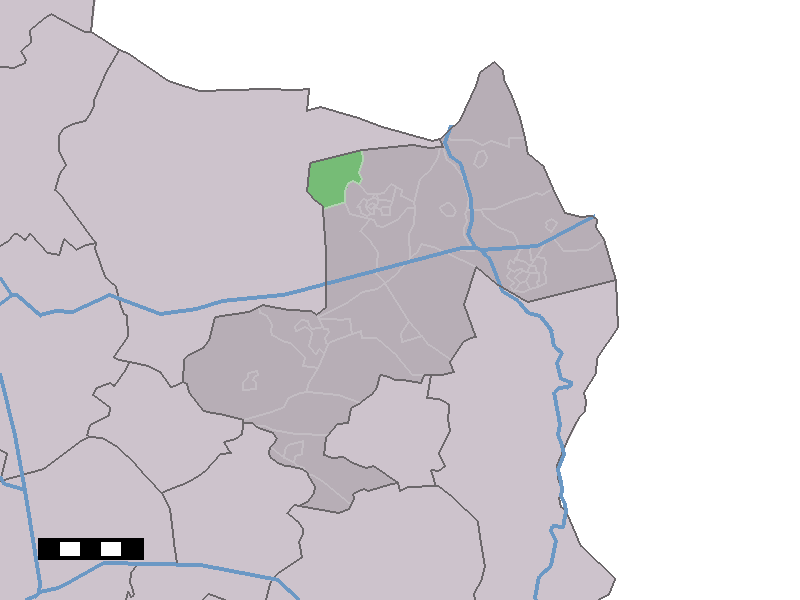
- Nutter in the municipality of Dinkelland.

- Location in the Netherlands Nutter (Netherlands)
- Coordinates: 52°25′30″N 6°52′41″E
- Country: Netherlands
- Province: Overijssel
- Municipality: Dinkelland

Area
  - Total: 5.35 km^{2} (2.07 sq mi)
- Elevation: 65 m (213 ft)

Population (2021)
  - Total: 190
  - Density: 36/km^{2} (92/sq mi)
- Time zone: UTC+1 (CET)
  - Summer (DST): UTC+2 (CEST)
- Postal code: 7638
- Dialing code: 0541

Nutter is a hamlet in the Dutch province of Overijssel. It is a part of the municipality of Dinkelland, and lies about 13 km north of Oldenzaal.

It was first mentioned in 1297 as Nuthere. The etymology is unclear. In 1840, it was home to 194 people. There are direction signs to Nutter, but no place name signs that you have arrived.

== Gallery ==
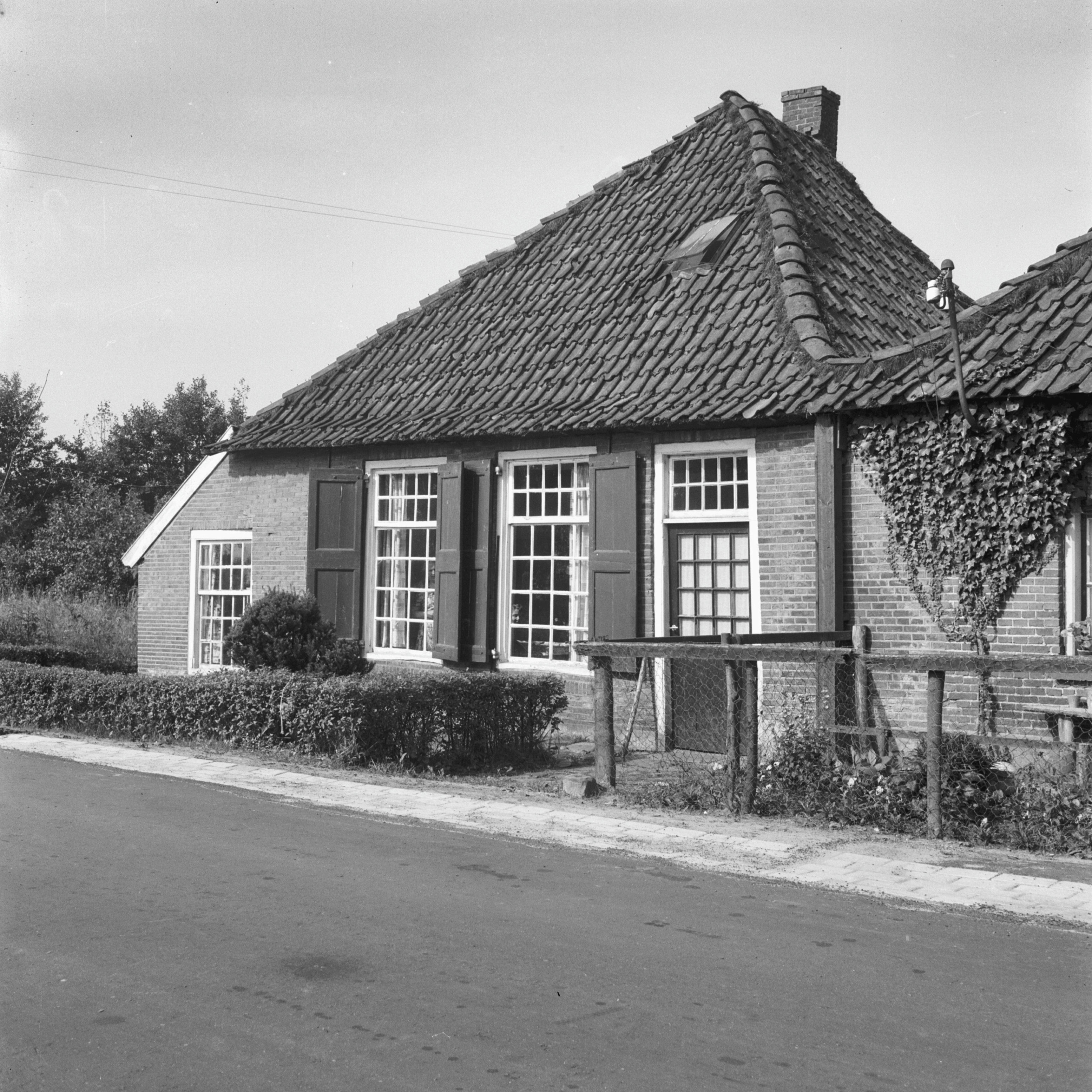
Cottage

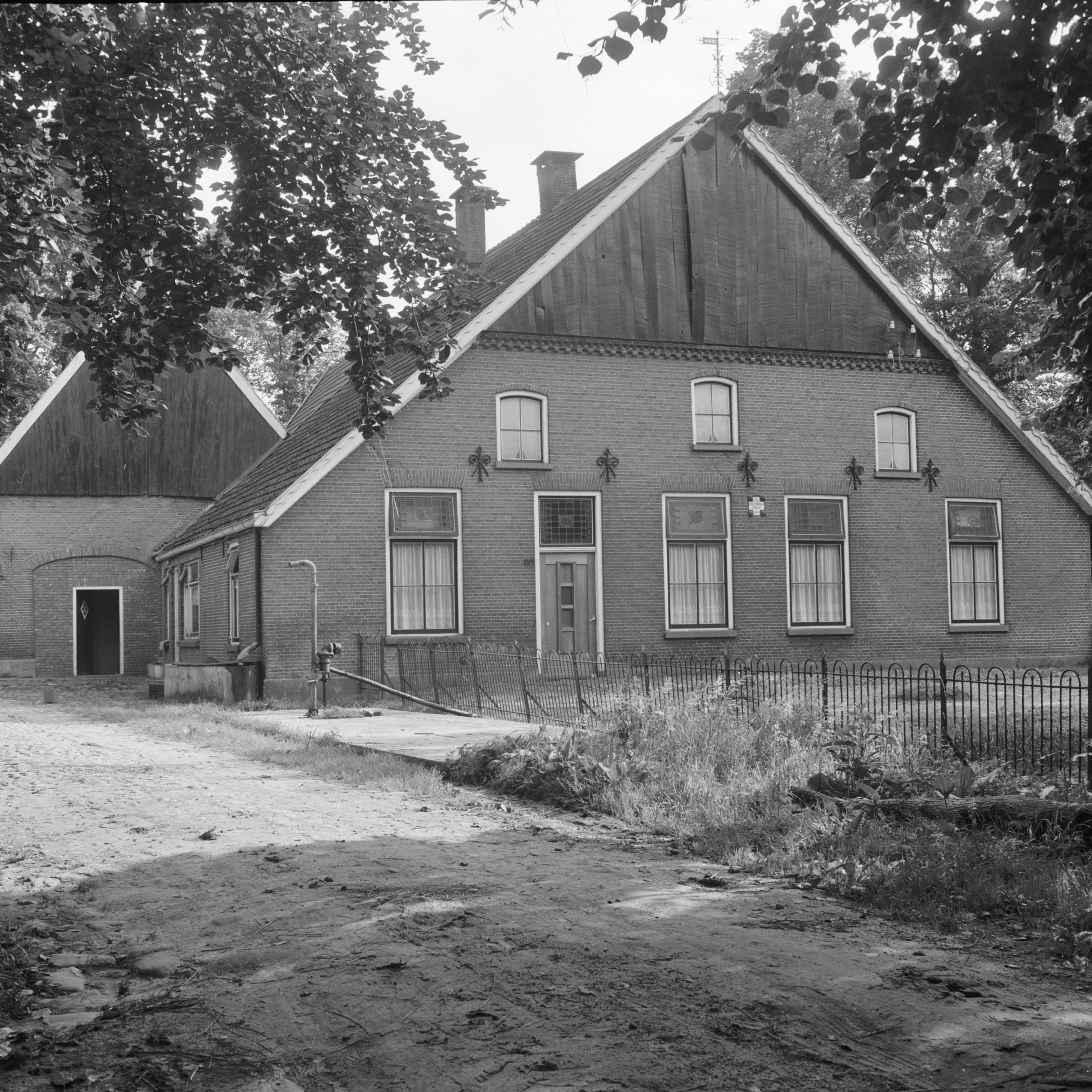
Cottage

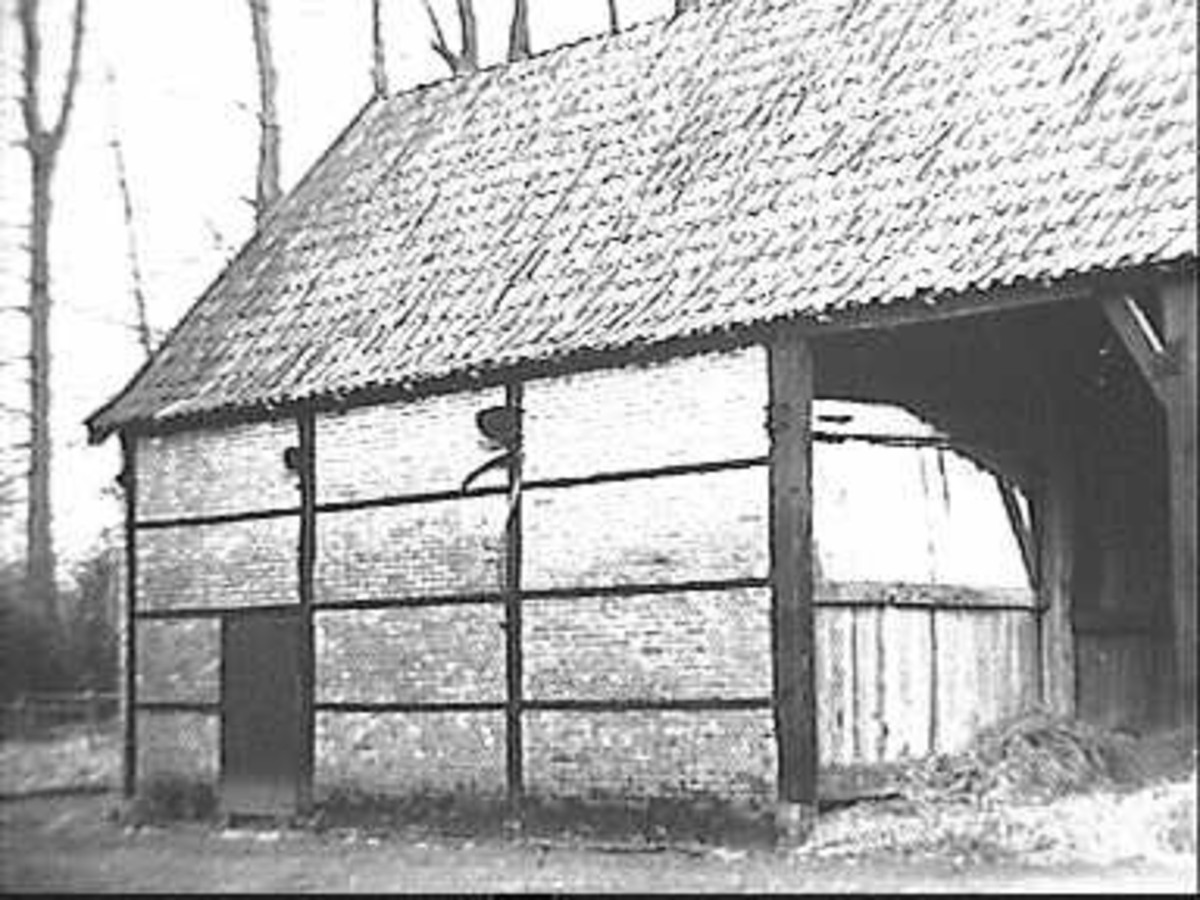
Barn
