= Dulder =

- Hamlet
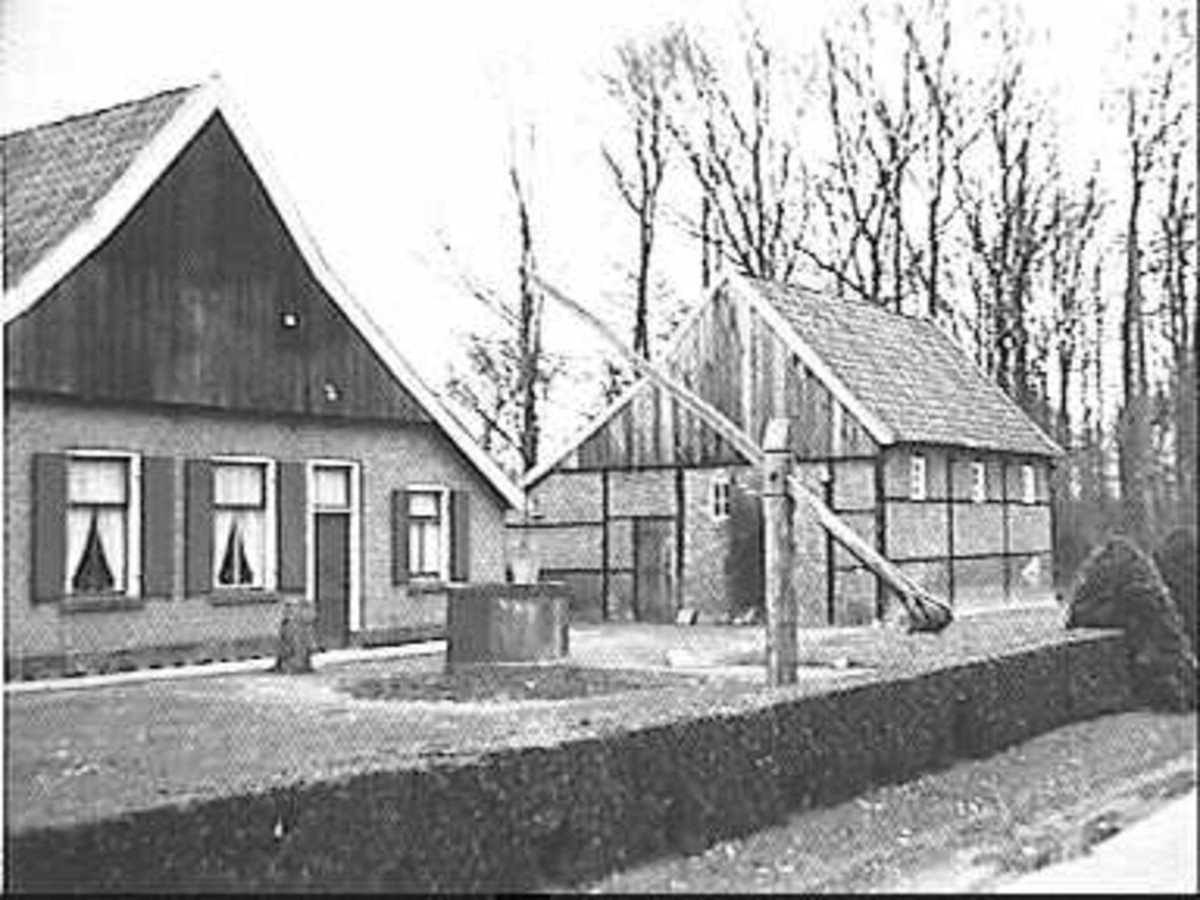
- Farm with well

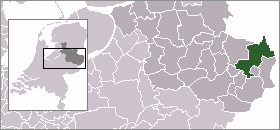

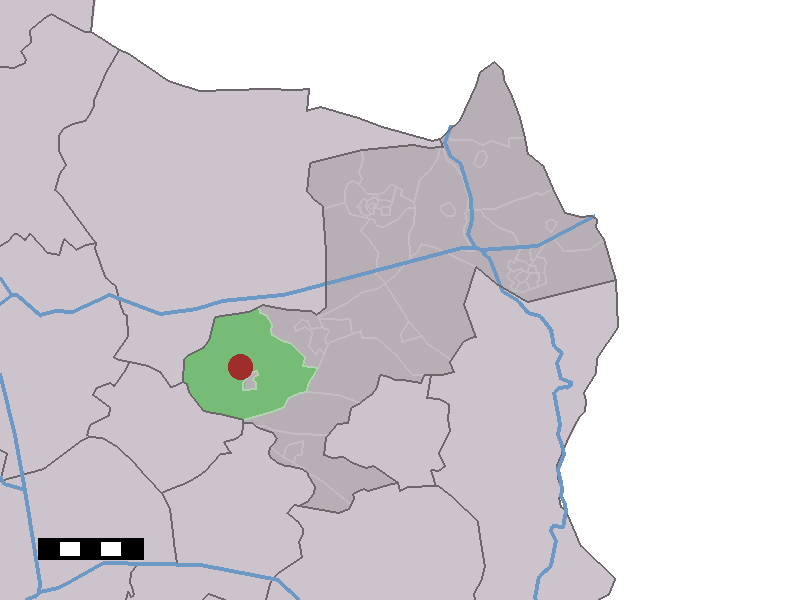
- The village (dark red) and the statistical district (light green) of Dulder in the municipality of Dinkelland.

- Location in the Netherlands Dulder (Netherlands)
- Coordinates: 52°20′27″N 6°48′9″E
- Country: Netherlands
- Province: Overijssel
- Municipality: Dinkelland

Area
  - Total: 21.58 km^{2} (8.33 sq mi)
- Elevation: 18 m (59 ft)

Population (2021)
  - Total: 1,015
  - Density: 47.03/km^{2} (121.8/sq mi)
- Time zone: UTC+1 (CET)
  - Summer (DST): UTC+2 (CEST)
- Postal code: 7597
- Dialing code: 074

Dulder is a hamlet in the Dutch province of Overijssel. It is a part of the municipality of Dinkelland, and lies about 8 km north of Hengelo.

The statistical area includes the hamlets of 't Loo, Noordijk and Zoeke, and therefore the figure is too high. It was first mentioned in the late-10th century as Thuleri. The etymology is unclear. Im 1840, it was home to 932 people.
