= Deurningen =

- Village
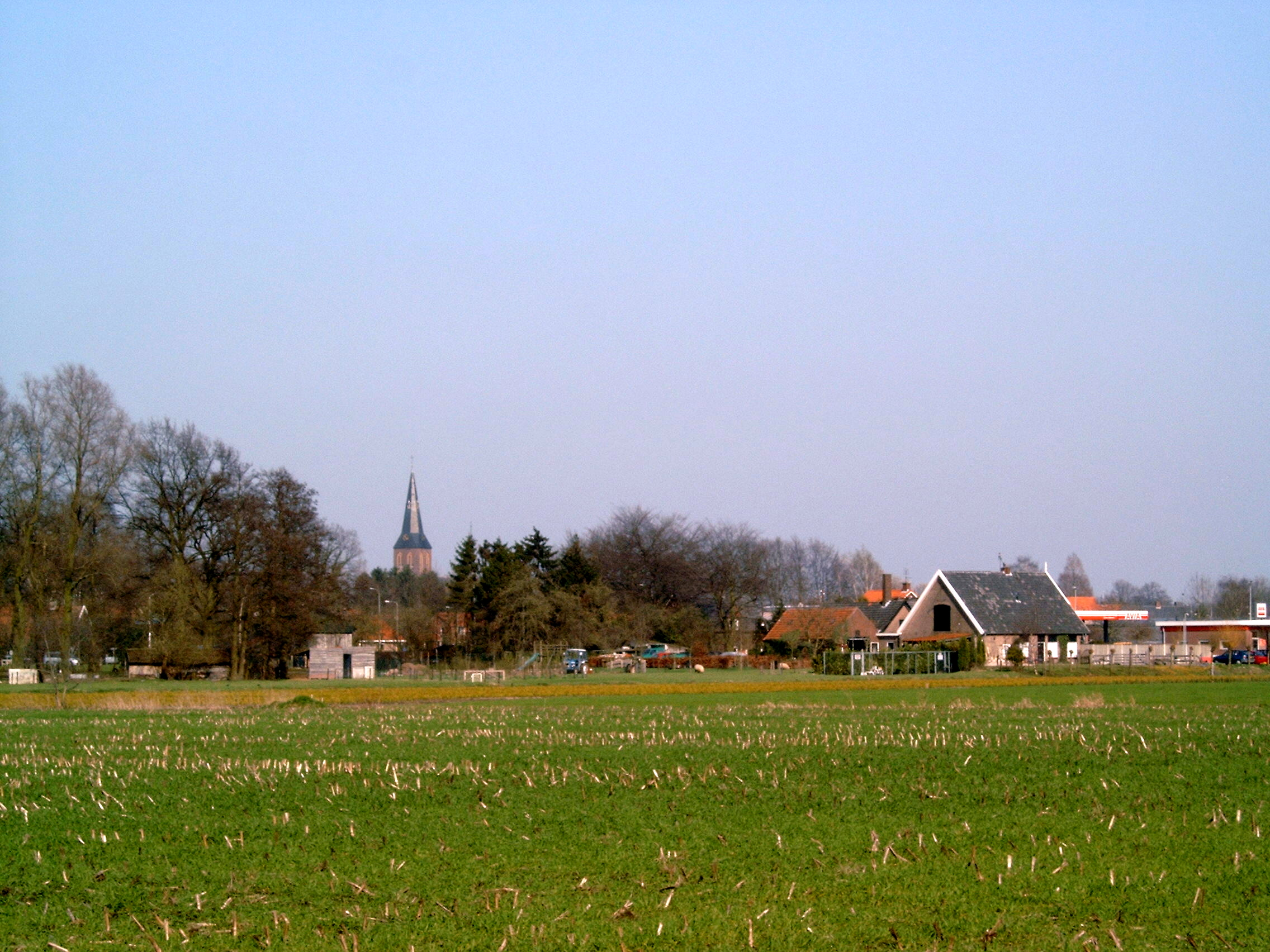
- Nickname: Plagnstekkers
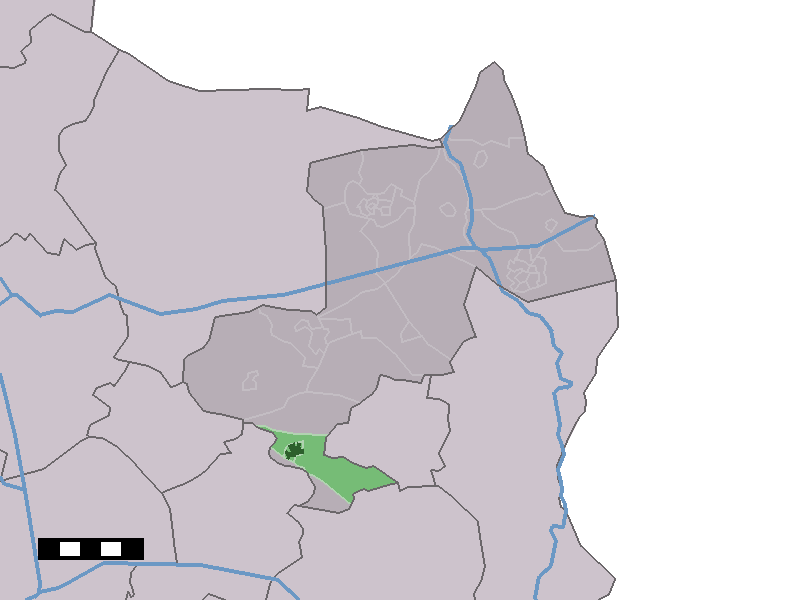
- The village centre (dark green) and the statistical district (light green) of Deurningen in the municipality of Dinkelland.

- Location in the Netherlands Deurningen (Netherlands)
- Coordinates: 52°18′24″N 6°50′22″E
- Country: Netherlands
- Province: Overijssel
- Municipality: Dinkelland

Area
  - Total: 18.66 km^{2} (7.20 sq mi)
- Elevation: 19 m (62 ft)

Population (2021)
  - Total: 2,015
  - Density: 108.0/km^{2} (279.7/sq mi)
- Demonym: Deurningers
- Time zone: UTC+1 (CET)
  - Summer (DST): UTC+2 (CEST)
- Postal code: 7561
- Dialing code: 074

Deurningen is a village in the Dutch province of Overijssel. It is a part of the municipality of Dinkelland, and lies about 5 km (3.1 mi) northeast of Hengelo.

== Overview ==
It was first mentioned in 1295 as Thornengen. The etymology is unclear. In 1787 a church was built, and the village developed around the church. The current church was completed in 1912. In 1840, it was home to 719 people. In 2001, 97 houses in Deurningen were transferred to the municipality of Oldenzaal.

== Gallery ==
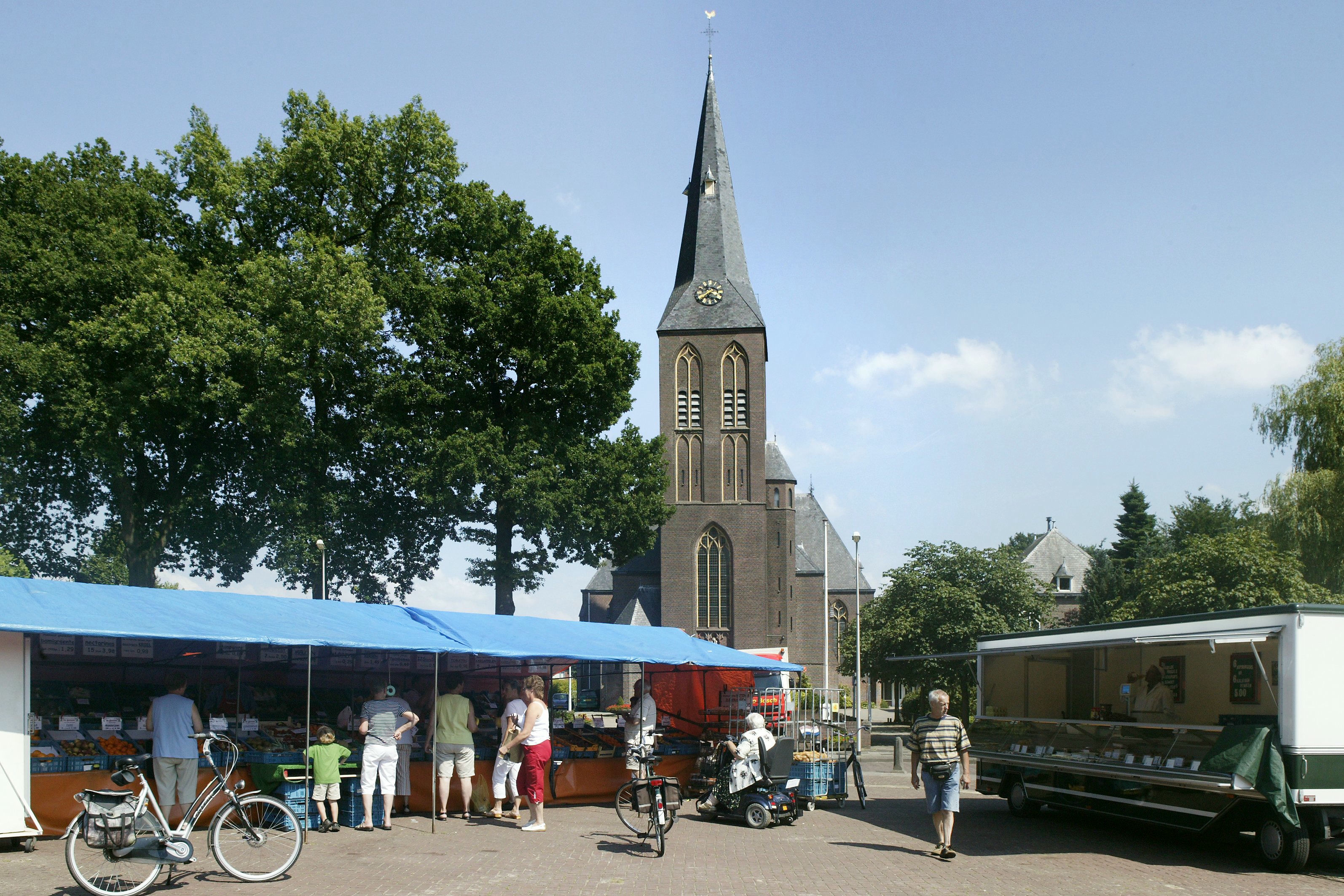
Market in Deurningen

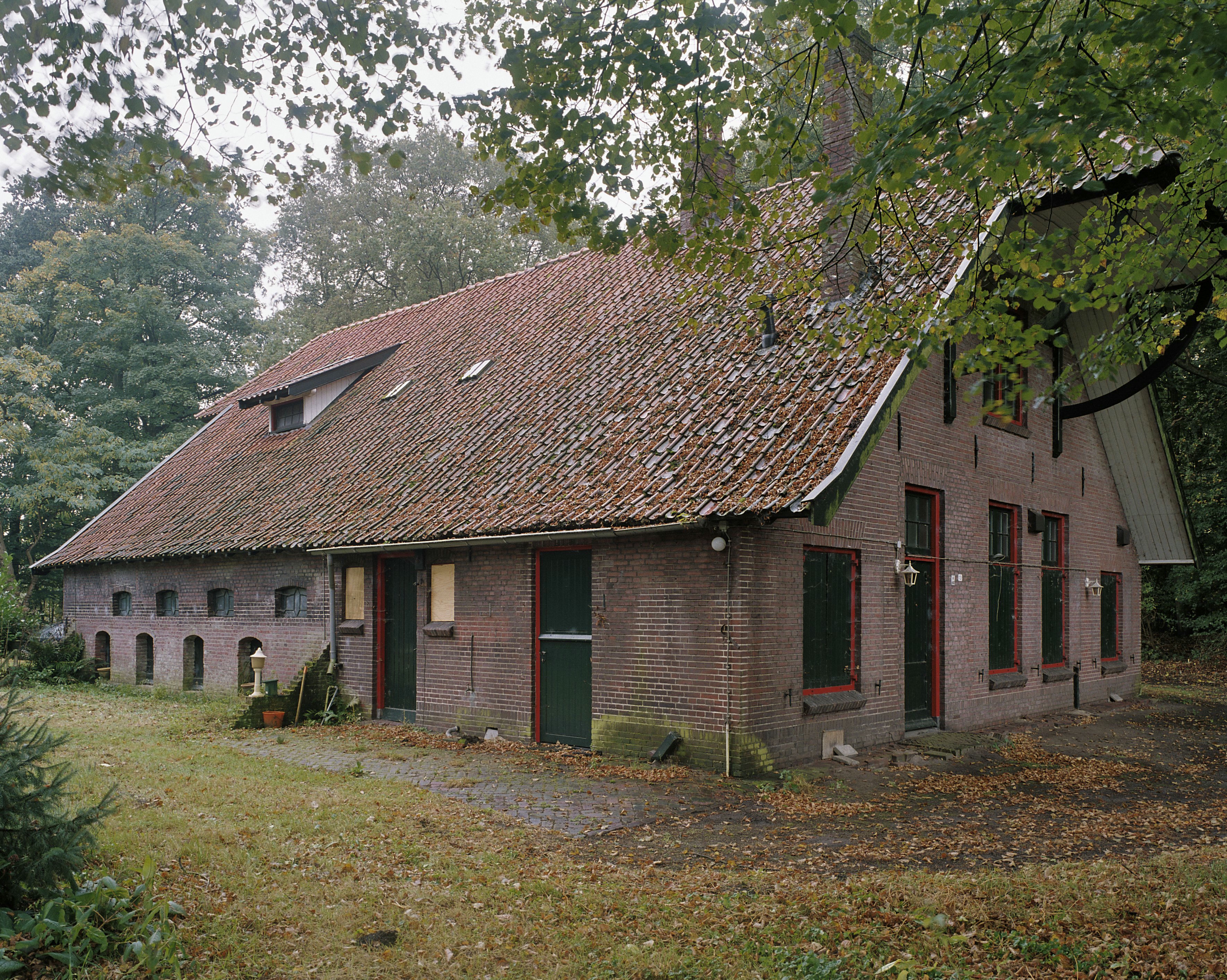
Farm "Oosterhof" in Deurningen
