= List of cities, towns and villages in Overijssel =

Flag of Overijssel

This is a list of settlements in the province of Overijssel, Netherlands.

Name	Municipality	Coordinates
Aadorp	Twenterand	52°22′35″N 6°37′45″E
Achterhoek	Hof van Twente	52°14′55″N 6°29′10″E
Albergen	Tubbergen	52°22′15″N 6°45′45″E
Almelo	Almelo	52°21′25″N 6°39′45″E
Ane	Hardenberg	52°36′50″N 6°39′05″E
Anerveen	Hardenberg	52°37′55″N 6°39′25″E
Anevelde	Hardenberg	52°35′50″N 6°39′10″E
Ankum	Dalfsen	52°31′15″N 6°14′30″E
Apenhuizen	Deventer	52°15′25″N 6°18′00″E
Archem	Ommen	52°28′35″N 6°26′25″E
Arriën	Ommen	52°31′35″N 6°26′55″E
Arriërveld	Ommen	52°33′50″N 6°26′05″E
Averlo	Deventer	52°18′00″N 6°12′55″E
Azelo	Hof van Twente	52°18′00″N 6°42′50″E
Baarlo	Steenwijkerland	52°44′15″N 5°57′00″E
Baarlo	Zwartewaterland	52°39′50″N 6°06′25″E
Baars	Steenwijkerland	52°48′50″N 6°05′30″E
Balkbrug	Hardenberg	52°36′00″N 6°23′40″E
Barsbeek	Steenwijkerland	52°39′25″N 6°01′20″E
Basse	Steenwijkerland	52°48′15″N 6°01′55″E
Basserveld	Steenwijkerland	52°48′50″N 6°02′30″E
Bathmen	Deventer	52°15′00″N 6°17′15″E
Bavinkel	Almelo	52°20′25″N 6°41′35″E
Beckum	Hengelo (O.)	52°12′40″N 6°44′30″E
Beekdorp	Dinkelland	52°21′20″N 6°49′55″E
Beerze	Ommen	52°30′50″N 6°31′45″E
Beerzerveld	Ommen	52°29′35″N 6°34′25″E
Belt-Schutsloot	Steenwijkerland	52°40′20″N 6°03′50″E
Benedenvaart	Hardenberg	52°35′55″N 6°22′40″E
Bentelo	Hof van Twente	52°13′30″N 6°41′00″E
Bergentheim	Hardenberg	52°31′35″N 6°36′50″E
Berghum	Dinkelland	52°22′05″N 7°01′10″E
't Bergje	Hardenberg	52°37′00″N 6°28′35″E
Besthmen	Ommen	52°30′10″N 6°25′50″E
Beuningen,	Losser	52°21′30″N 6°59′55″E
Beuseberg	Rijssen	52°16′05″N 6°25′15″E
Bisschopswetering	Kampen	52°34′00″N 5°59′25″E
Blankenham	Steenwijkerland	52°45′50″N 5°53′45″E
Blokzijl	Steenwijkerland	52°43′35″N 5°57′40″E
Boekelo	Enschede	52°12′15″N 6°47′55″E
Boerhaar	Olst-Wijhe	52°22′30″N 6°09′05″E
Borkeld	Rijssen	52°16′35″N 6°28′00″E
Borne	Borne	52°18′00″N 6°45′00″E
Bornerbroek	Almelo	52°18′35″N 6°39′15″E
Boskamp	Olst-Wijhe	52°19′50″N 6°07′40″E
Braamberg	Hardenberg	52°38′45″N 6°31′10″E
Brammelo	Haaksbergen	52°09′10″N 6°40′40″E
Breklenkamp	Dinkelland	52°27′15″N 6°59′10″E
Brinkhoek	Zwolle	52°32′10″N 6°07′20″E
Broekheurne	Enschede	52°10′50″N 6°52′00″E
Broekhuizen	Dalfsen	52°31′15″N 6°12′45″E
Broekland	Raalte	52°21′40″N 6°11′55″E
Brucht	Hardenberg	52°33′00″N 6°36′35″E
Bruchterveld	Hardenberg	52°31′50″N 6°39′40″E
Bruggenhoek	Zwolle	52°32′00″N 6°08′10″E
Bruinehaar	Twenterand	52°28′10″N 6°42′15″E
Buurse	Haaksbergen	52°08′45″N 6°49′50″E
Cellemuiden	Zwartewaterland	52°37′35″N 6°03′45″E
Collendoorn	Hardenberg	52°35′40″N 6°36′15″E
Collendoornerveen	Hardenberg	52°35′35″N 6°35′30″E
Colmschate	Deventer	52°14′40″N 6°13′45″E
Daarle	Hellendoorn	52°26′05″N 6°32′15″E
Daarlerveen	Hellendoorn	52°26′30″N 6°34′35″E
Dalfsen	Dalfsen	52°30′40″N 6°15′25″E
Dalmsholte	Ommen	52°28′30″N 6°21′50″E
De Belt	Hardenberg	52°38′20″N 6°32′20″E
De Bult	Steenwijkerland	52°48′50″N 6°07′45″E
Dedemsvaart	Hardenberg	52°36′00″N 6°27′30″E
De Haandrik	Hardenberg	52°37′25″N 6°41′55″E
De Haar	Hardenberg	52°36′35″N 6°22′20″E
De Heuvels	Kampen	52°30′45″N 5°53′55″E
De Hooge Wegen	Raalte	52°18′25″N 6°15′50″E
De Kolonie	Wierden	52°23′40″N 6°31′35″E
De Krieger	Steenwijkerland	52°39′20″N 6°00′40″E
De Krim	Hardenberg	52°39′00″N 6°37′05″E
Delden	Hof van Twente	52°15′35″N 6°42′40″E
Deldenerbroek	Hof van Twente	52°17′10″N 6°40′10″E
Deldeneresch	Hof van Twente	52°16′35″N 6°41′40″E
De Leijen	Staphorst	52°39′00″N 6°14′20″E
De Lutte	Losser	52°18′50″N 6°59′20″E
De Maat	Hardenberg	52°36′20″N 6°18′35″E
De Marshoek	Dalfsen	52°30′30″N 6°11′55″E
De Meele	Dalfsen	52°35′15″N 6°15′05″E
De Meene	Hardenberg	52°37′20″N 6°40′50″E
De Mulderij	Hardenberg	52°36′35″N 6°26′30″E
Den Braam	Haaksbergen	52°08′15″N 6°50′25″E
Denekamp	Dinkelland	52°22′40″N 7°00′25″E
Den Ham	Twenterand	52°27′55″N 6°29′45″E
Den Huizen	Hardenberg	52°36′45″N 6°22′50″E
Den Hulst	Dalfsen	52°35′30″N 6°17′15″E
Den Kaat	Hardenberg	52°36′55″N 6°23′55″E
Den Nul	Olst-Wijhe	52°21′30″N 6°06′40″E
Den Oosterhuis	Hardenberg	52°37′05″N 6°25′15″E
Den Velde	Hardenberg	52°36′05″N 6°41′45″E
Den Westerhuis	Hardenberg	52°37′40″N 6°21′50″E
De Pol	Hardenberg	52°36′15″N 6°24′45″E
De Pol	Steenwijkerland	52°49′10″N 6°04′50″E
De Pollen	Twenterand	52°26′00″N 6°39′55″E
De Roskam	Kampen	52°31′20″N 5°54′25″E
De Schans	Hardenberg	52°37′25″N 6°37′40″E
Deurningen	Dinkelland	52°18′05″N 6°50′15″E
De Velde	Zwartewaterland	52°37′15″N 6°05′25″E
Deventer	Deventer	52°15′20″N 6°09′50″E
De Zande	Kampen	52°30′50″N 5°57′35″E
Diepenheim	Hof van Twente	52°12′00″N 6°33′20″E
Diepenveen	Deventer	52°17′20″N 6°09′10″E
Diffelen	Hardenberg	52°31′20″N 6°33′35″E
Dijkerhoek	Rijssen	52°16′45″N 6°21′00″E
Doosje	Steenwijkerland	52°40′45″N 6°08′10″E
Dortherhoek	Deventer	52°13′55″N 6°16′40″E
Driene	Hengelo (O.)	52°15′45″N 6°50′20″E
Dulder	Dinkelland	52°20′15″N 6°48′00″E
Duur	Olst-Wijhe	52°21′50″N 6°06′50″E
Dwarsgracht	Steenwijkerland	52°43′25″N 6°02′15″E
Ebbenbroek	Hardenberg	52°32′10″N 6°41′05″E
Eerde	Ommen	52°29′15″N 6°26′45″E
Eese	Steenwijkerland	52°50′10″N 6°06′50″E
Eesveen	Steenwijkerland	52°49′25″N 6°08′25″E
Egede	Hellendoorn	52°26′25″N 6°27′10″E
Eikelhof	Olst-Wijhe	52°18′50″N 6°09′50″E
Eelen en Rhaan	Hellendoorn	52°25′00″N 6°27′05″E
Elsen	Hof van Twente	52°16′10″N 6°32′20″E
Elsenerbroek	Hof van Twente	52°15′45″N 6°35′10″E
Elshof	Olst-Wijhe	52°23′35″N 6°12′00″E
Emmen	Dalfsen	52°29′45″N 6°13′50″E
Engeland	Dalfsen	52°31′35″N 6°15′10″E
Engeland	Hardenberg	52°36′15″N 6°37′55″E
Enschede	Enschede	52°13′05″N 6°53′45″E
Enter	Wierden	52°17′40″N 6°34′40″E
Eppenzolder	Haaksbergen	52°11′10″N 6°42′40″E
Espelo	Rijssen	52°18′30″N 6°21′05″E
Fleringen	Tubbergen	52°22′55″N 6°48′20″E
Fortmond	Olst-Wijhe	52°22′05″N 6°05′20″E
Frankhuis	Zwolle	52°31′30″N 6°04′05″E
Frieswijk	Deventer	52°17′10″N 6°12′45″E
Gammelke	Dinkelland	52°19′05″N 6°51′05″E
Geerdijk	Twenterand	52°28′35″N 6°34′15″E
Geesteren	Tubbergen	52°25′15″N 6°44′10″E
Genemuiden	Zwartewaterland	52°37′25″N 6°02′25″E
Genne	Zwartewaterland	52°33′45″N 6°07′05″E
Genne-Overwaters	Zwartewaterland	52°34′00″N 6°06′00″E
Gerner	Dalfsen	52°31′15″N 6°15′40″E
Giethmen	Ommen	52°29′40″N 6°24′10″E
Giethoorn	Steenwijkerland	52°44′25″N 6°04′45″E
Glane	Losser	52°13′55″N 7°00′10″E
Glane-Beekhoek	Enschede	52°13′25″N 6°58′30″E
Glanerbrug	Enschede	52°12′55″N 6°58′15″E
Goor	Hof van Twente	52°14′00″N 6°35′10″E
Gouden Ploeg	Hardenberg	52°30′45″N 6°36′05″E
Grafhorst	Kampen	52°34′55″N 5°56′00″E
Gramsbergen	Hardenberg	52°36′35″N 6°40′20″E
Groot Agelo	Dinkelland	52°23′35″N 6°53′15″E
Groot-Oever	Hardenberg	52°39′00″N 6°20′20″E
Haaksbergen	Haaksbergen	52°09′25″N 6°44′20″E
't Haantje	Hardenberg	52°36′50″N 6°36′10″E
Haarle	Hellendoorn	52°21′35″N 6°22′50″E
Haarle	Tubbergen	52°24′15″N 6°50′20″E
Haerst	Zwolle	52°32′30″N 6°08′10″E
Halfweg	Staphorst	52°40′00″N 6°15′35″E
Hallerhoek	Twenterand	52°26′55″N 6°28′10″E
Hamingen	Staphorst	52°40′20″N 6°08′40″E
Hanekamp	Hardenberg	52°34′45″N 6°41′40″E
Hankate	Hellendoorn	52°26′05″N 6°26′20″E
Harbrinkhoek	Tubbergen	52°23′05″N 6°43′05″E
Hardenberg	Hardenberg	52°34′30″N 6°37′10″E
Harmöle	Haaksbergen	52°07′45″N 6°51′15″E
Hasselt	Zwartewaterland	52°35′30″N 6°05′45″E
Heemserveen	Hardenberg	52°34′55″N 6°34′00″E
's-Heerenbroek	Kampen	52°32′20″N 6°00′45″E
Heeten	Raalte	52°19′55″N 6°16′45″E
Heetveld	Steenwijkerland	52°39′45″N 6°00′40″E
Heino	Raalte	52°26′05″N 6°14′00″E
Hellendoorn	Hellendoorn	52°23′20″N 6°27′05″E
Hengelo	Hengelo (O.)	52°15′55″N 6°47′35″E
Hengevelde	Hof van Twente	52°11′55″N 6°38′10″E
Hengforden	Olst-Wijhe	52°18′55″N 6°07′40″E
Herfte	Zwolle	52°30′30″N 6°09′25″E
Herike	Hof van Twente	52°15′00″N 6°32′05″E
Hertme	Borne	52°19′15″N 6°45′35″E
Herxen	Olst-Wijhe	52°25′45″N 6°08′05″E
Hessum	Dalfsen	52°30′45″N 6°18′50″E
Het Loo	Wierden	52°22′10″N 6°34′30″E
Het Stift	Dinkelland	52°21′20″N 6°50′35″E
Hexel	Hellendoorn	52°20′35″N 6°28′00″E
Hezingen	Tubbergen	52°26′30″N 6°51′20″E
Hoge-Hexel	Wierden	52°23′50″N 6°33′45″E
Hogeweg	Kampen	52°30′40″N 5°55′40″E
Holt	Dalfsen	52°31′25″N 6°20′10″E
Holten	Rijssen	52°16′50″N 6°25′20″E
Holten	Zwartewaterland	52°34′15″N 6°06′45″E
Holterbroek	Rijssen	52°16′05″N 6°23′25″E
Holtheme	Hardenberg	52°36′45″N 6°41′20″E
Holthone	Hardenberg	52°38′25″N 6°41′05″E
Honesch	Haaksbergen	52°08′50″N 6°44′40″E
Hoogengraven	Ommen	52°32′35″N 6°28′50″E
Hoogenweg	Hardenberg	52°34′00″N 6°39′45″E
Hoonhorst	Dalfsen	52°29′10″N 6°13′40″E
Hulsen	Hellendoorn	52°22′45″N 6°28′25″E
Huurne	Wierden	52°21′00″N 6°34′40″E
IJhorst	Staphorst	52°39′35″N 6°17′30″E
IJpelo	Wierden	52°19′20″N 6°35′25″E
IJsselham	Steenwijkerland	52°48′30″N 5°57′25″E
IJsselmuiden	Kampen	52°33′55″N 5°56′00″E
Jonen	Steenwijkerland	52°43′10″N 6°01′05″E
Junne	Ommen	52°31′10″N 6°29′25″E
Kadoelen	Steenwijkerland	52°40′10″N 6°00′30″E
Kalenberg	Steenwijkerland	52°46′35″N 5°57′15″E
Kallenkote	Steenwijkerland	52°47′55″N 6°10′45″E
Kampen	Kampen	52°33′20″N 5°54′40″E
Kampereiland	Kampen	52°35′00″N 5°53′30″E
Kamperveen	Kampen	52°31′10″N 5°55′00″E
Kamperzeedijk-Oost	Zwartewaterland	52°35′50″N 6°00′25″E
Kamperzeedijk-West	Zwartewaterland	52°35′40″N 5°59′05″E
Katerveer	Zwolle	52°30′00″N 6°04′10″E
Keiendorp	Hardenberg	52°37′20″N 6°34′50″E
Kievitshaar	Hardenberg	52°37′00″N 6°19′05″E
Kievitsnest	Zwartewaterland	52°36′10″N 6°06′00″E
Klein Agelo	Dinkelland	52°24′00″N 6°54′00″E
Kloosterhaar	Hardenberg	52°29′50″N 6°40′10″E
Klössehoek	Tubbergen	52°22′30″N 6°43′15″E
Kuinre	Steenwijkerland	52°47′15″N 5°50′25″E
Laag Zuthem	Raalte	52°27′35″N 6°10′15″E
Langelo	Haaksbergen	52°08′35″N 6°42′30″E
Langenholte	Zwolle	52°32′55″N 6°06′35″E
Langeveen	Tubbergen	52°27′45″N 6°43′05″E
Lankhorst	Staphorst	52°40′40″N 6°13′20″E
Lattrop	Dinkelland	52°25′35″N 6°58′35″E
Leeuwte	Steenwijkerland	52°41′30″N 5°59′15″E
Lemele	Ommen	52°27′10″N 6°24′55″E
Lemelerveld	Dalfsen	52°26′45″N 6°20′30″E
Lemselo	Dinkelland	52°20′20″N 6°53′35″E
Lenthe	Dalfsen	52°28′55″N 6°12′00″E
Lettele	Deventer	52°16′40″N 6°16′25″E
Lichtmis	Zwolle	52°35′00″N 6°11′40″E
Lierderholthuis	Raalte	52°26′10″N 6°11′30″E
Ligtenberg	Rijssen	52°19′00″N 6°27′45″E
Linde	Deventer	52°16′40″N 6°14′05″E
Linde	Twenterand	52°27′05″N 6°30′20″E
Lonneker	Enschede	52°15′00″N 6°54′40″E
Loo	Deventer	52°15′10″N 6°20′20″E
Look	Rijssen	52°16′45″N 6°26′50″E
Losser	Losser	52°15′40″N 7°00′15″E
Lutten	Hardenberg	52°36′40″N 6°34′25″E
Luttenberg	Raalte	52°24′20″N 6°22′05″E
Lutten-Oever	Hardenberg	52°38′20″N 6°21′45″E
Lutterhartje	Hardenberg	52°38′05″N 6°37′25″E
Magele	Twenterand	52°28′10″N 6°31′15″E
Mander	Tubbergen	52°26′35″N 6°49′30″E
Manderveen	Tubbergen	52°26′40″N 6°46′50″E
Mariaparochie	Tubbergen	52°22′55″N 6°42′25″E
Mariënberg	Hardenberg	52°30′32″N 6°34′24″E
Mariënheem	Raalte	52°23′00″N 6°19′20″E
Marijenkampen	Steenwijkerland	52°48′50″N 6°03′25″E
Markelo	Hof van Twente	52°14′05″N 6°29′55″E
Markvelde	Hof van Twente	52°10′25″N 6°36′30″E
Marle	Olst-Wijhe	52°24′50″N 6°07′35″E
Marle	Hellendoorn	52°25′25″N 6°28′50″E
Mastenbroek	Zwartewaterland	52°34′30″N 6°01′25″E
Mataram	Dalfsen	52°29′50″N 6°13′00″E
Meer	Twenterand	52°27′40″N 6°27′40″E
Mekkelhorst	Losser	52°21′30″N 7°01′10″E
Middel	Olst-Wijhe	52°21′00″N 6°10′35″E
Millingen	Dalfsen	52°29′30″N 6°15′10″E
Moespot	Steenwijkerland	52°41′10″N 5°57′55″E
Molenbelt	Deventer	52°18′05″N 6°08′55″E
Molenhoek	Steenwijkerland	52°48′10″N 6°02′40″E
Muggenbeet	Steenwijkerland	52°44′30″N 5°59′35″E
Nederland	Steenwijkerland	52°45′20″N 5°57′55″E
Neerdorp	Rijssen	52°17′40″N 6°23′15″E
Nieuwebrug	Ommen	52°29′20″N 6°25′25″E
Nieuwe Wetering	Zwartewaterland	52°35′25″N 6°02′45″E
Nieuw-Heeten	Raalte	52°19′15″N 6°21′05″E
Nieuwleusen	Dalfsen	52°34′55″N 6°16′55″E
Nieuwstad	Kampen	52°32′05″N 5°57′55″E
Nijrees	Almelo	52°20′05″N 6°39′50″E
Nijverdal	Hellendoorn	52°21′35″N 6°28′05″E
Noetsele	Hellendoorn	52°21′15″N 6°27′25″E
Noord Deurningen	Dinkelland	52°23′50″N 7°01′15″E
Noordijk	Dinkelland	52°21′00″N 6°49′00″E
Noord-Meer	Twenterand	52°28′05″N 6°27′45″E
Noord-Stegeren	Hardenberg	52°36′45″N 6°28′15″E
Notter	Wierden	52°20′05″N 6°31′15″E
Nutter	Dinkelland	52°25′30″N 6°52′50″E
Oele	Hengelo (O.)	52°14′45″N 6°45′10″E
Okkenbroek	Deventer	52°17′55″N 6°19′10″E
Oldemarkt	Steenwijkerland	52°49′15″N 5°58′30″E
Oldeneel	Zwolle	52°28′50″N 6°05′20″E
Oldenzaal	Oldenzaal	52°18′50″N 6°55′45″E
Olst	Olst-Wijhe	52°20′15″N 6°06′35″E
Ommen	Ommen	52°31′15″N 6°25′15″E
Ommerschans	Ommen	52°35′20″N 6°23′30″E
Onna	Steenwijkerland	52°46′30″N 6°08′50″E
Ooster-Dalfsen	Dalfsen	52°30′40″N 6°16′30″E
Oosterholt	Kampen	52°33′35″N 5°57′20″E
Ootmarsum	Dinkelland	52°24′30″N 6°54′05″E
Ossenzijl	Steenwijkerland	52°48′35″N 5°55′05″E
Oud-Avereest	Hardenberg	52°37′10″N 6°22′20″E
Oud-Bergentheim	Hardenberg	52°31′25″N 6°34′55″E
Oude Molen	Deventer	52°15′40″N 6°17′10″E
Oudleusen	Dalfsen	52°32′00″N 6°18′45″E
Oud-Lutten	Hardenberg	52°37′25″N 6°36′25″E
Oud Ootmarsum	Dinkelland	52°25′05″N 6°54′30″E
Overdinkel	Losser	52°14′10″N 7°02′15″E
Overwater	Hellendoorn	52°23′45″N 6°30′15″E
Oxe	Deventer	52°13′50″N 6°14′10″E
Paasloo	Steenwijkerland	52°48′45″N 6°00′55″E
Pieriksmars	Deventer	52°16′10″N 6°19′55″E
Piksen	Hellendoorn	52°24′30″N 6°31′10″E
Poepershoek	Steenwijkerland	52°39′55″N 6°01′30″E
Pothoek	Hof van Twente	52°14′50″N 6°30′30″E
Punthorst	Staphorst	52°36′50″N 6°15′45″E
Raalte	Raalte	52°23′10″N 6°16′30″E
Radewijk	Hardenberg	52°34′20″N 6°42′35″E
Rande	Deventer	52°17′25″N 6°07′35″E
Rechteren	Dalfsen	52°29′40″N 6°17′25″E
Rectum	Wierden	52°19′40″N 6°34′10″E
Reutum	Tubbergen	52°23′25″N 6°50′40″E
Rhaan	Hellendoorn	52°25′45″N 6°27′00″E
Rheeze	Hardenberg	52°32′55″N 6°34′55″E
Rheezerveen	Hardenberg	52°33′55″N 6°31′30″E
Rijssen	Rijssen	52°18′25″N 6°31′05″E
Roebolligehoek	Zwartewaterland	52°36′30″N 6°04′50″E
Roekebosch	Steenwijkerland	52°43′10″N 6°08′05″E
Rollecate	Staphorst	52°35′30″N 6°14′50″E
Ronduite	Steenwijkerland	52°41′15″N 6°02′40″E
Rosengaarde	Dalfsen	52°31′40″N 6°14′15″E
Rossum	Dinkelland	52°21′05″N 6°55′20″E
Rouveen	Staphorst	52°36′50″N 6°11′05″E
Ruitenveen	Dalfsen	52°33′55″N 6°15′05″E
Rutbeek	Enschede	52°10′50″N 6°48′05″E
Saasveld	Dinkelland	52°19′55″N 6°48′25″E
Schalkhaar	Deventer	52°16′05″N 6°11′40″E
Scheerwolde	Steenwijkerland	52°45′25″N 6°00′50″E
Schoolbuurt	Hof van Twente	52°15′25″N 6°31′45″E
Schuilenburg	Hellendoorn	52°24′35″N 6°28′15″E
Schuinesloot	Hardenberg	52°38′45″N 6°33′25″E
Sibculo	Hardenberg	52°28′55″N 6°38′15″E
Sint Isidorushoeve	Haaksbergen	52°10′35″N 6°42′05″E
Sint Jansklooster	Steenwijkerland	52°40′40″N 6°00′20″E
Slagharen	Hardenberg	52°37′45″N 6°33′20″E
Slingenberg	Staphorst	52°40′40″N 6°11′15″E
Sluis Zeven	Hardenberg	52°36′30″N 6°31′30″E
Snippeling	Deventer	52°15′00″N 6°11′35″E
Sponturfwijk	Hardenberg	52°36′25″N 6°25′30″E
Spoolde	Zwolle	52°30′25″N 6°03′15″E
Staphorst	Staphorst	52°38′40″N 6°12′40″E
Steenwijk	Steenwijkerland	52°47′15″N 6°07′15″E
Steenwijkerwold	Steenwijkerland	52°48′15″N 6°03′50″E
Stegeren	Ommen	52°31′25″N 6°30′30″E
Stegerveld	Ommen	52°34′20″N 6°30′00″E
Stepelo	Haaksbergen	52°11′55″N 6°43′35″E
Stokkum	Hof van Twente	52°12′45″N 6°30′25″E
Streukel	Zwartewaterland	52°35′05″N 6°06′55″E
Strooiendorp	Hardenberg	52°36′30″N 6°25′55″E
Thij	Steenwijkerland	52°48′00″N 6°04′20″E
Tilligte	Dinkelland	52°24′20″N 6°57′05″E
Tjoene	Deventer	52°17′15″N 6°10′45″E
Tubbergen	Tubbergen	52°24′25″N 6°47′05″E
Tuk	Steenwijkerland	52°47′50″N 6°05′40″E
Tusveld	Almelo	52°19′20″N 6°41′30″E
Twekkelo	Enschede	52°13′45″N 6°48′35″E
Usselo	Enschede	52°12′10″N 6°49′55″E
Varsen	Ommen	52°31′15″N 6°23′05″E
Vasse	Tubbergen	52°26′05″N 6°49′55″E
Veecaten	Kampen	52°32′00″N 6°01′20″E
Veldhoek	Zwolle	52°30′40″N 6°08′20″E
Venebrugge	Hardenberg	52°33′40″N 6°40′25″E
Vennenberg	Dalfsen	52°28′40″N 6°19′40″E
Vilsteren	Ommen	52°30′40″N 6°21′05″E
Vinkenbuurt	Ommen	52°34′35″N 6°21′05″E
Vollenhove	Steenwijkerland	52°40′50″N 5°57′15″E
Volthe	Dinkelland	52°21′50″N 6°56′15″E
Vriezenveen	Twenterand	52°24′30″N 6°37′20″E
Vroomshoop	Twenterand	52°27′40″N 6°33′55″E
Wanneperveen	Steenwijkerland	52°42′15″N 6°07′20″E
Weerselo	Dinkelland	52°21′05″N 6°51′25″E
Weitemanslanden	Tubbergen	52°24′10″N 6°41′25″E
Weleveld	Borne	52°19′50″N 6°44′10″E
Welsum	Dalfsen	52°31′20″N 6°17′25″E
Welsum	Olst-Wijhe	52°20′10″N 6°05′30″E
Welsumerveld	Olst-Wijhe	52°18′50″N 6°05′10″E
Wesepe	Olst-Wijhe	52°19′50″N 6°12′45″E
Westeinde	Steenwijkerland	52°41′45″N 6°05′55″E
Westerhaar-Vriezenveensewijk	Twenterand	52°27′20″N 6°37′25″E
West Geesteren	Tubbergen	52°25′55″N 6°41′40″E
Wetering	Steenwijkerland	52°45′45″N 5°59′35″E
Wetserhuizingerveld	Staphorst	52°38′20″N 6°18′25″E
Wiene	Hof van Twente	52°14′05″N 6°39′05″E
Wierden	Wierden	52°21′35″N 6°35′35″E
Wijhe	Olst-Wijhe	52°23′10″N 6°08′05″E
Wijthmen	Zwolle	52°29′15″N 6°10′15″E
Willemsoord	Steenwijkerland	52°49′30″N 6°03′35″E
Wilsum	Kampen	52°31′45″N 5°58′00″E
Windesheim	Zwolle	52°26′50″N 6°07′55″E
Witharen	Ommen	52°33′40″N 6°23′45″E
Witman	Hardenberg	52°37′55″N 6°31′30″E
Witte Paarden	Steenwijkerland	52°48′35″N 6°04′40″E
Zalk	Kampen	52°31′15″N 6°00′30″E
Zalné	Zwolle	52°30′10″N 6°07′55″E
Zeesse	Ommen	52°30′45″N 6°26′15″E
Zeldam	Hof van Twente	52°15′25″N 6°37′45″E
Zenderen	Borne	52°19′25″N 6°43′25″E
Zoeke	Dinkelland	52°20′15″N 6°48′55″E
Zuideinde	Kampen	52°28′55″N 5°55′50″E
Zuidloo	Deventer	52°13′55″N 6°18′25″E
Zuidveen	Steenwijkerland	52°46′40″N 6°06′25″E
Zuna	Wierden	52°20′05″N 6°30′10″E
Zwartewatersklooster	Zwartewaterland	52°37′10″N 6°06′20″E
Zwartsluis	Zwartewaterland	52°38′30″N 6°04′10″E
Zwolle	Zwolle	52°30′45″N 6°05′40″E
