= Baarlo (disambiguation) =

Baarlo may refer to several places in the Netherlands:

- Baarlo, a town in the southeast
- Baarlo, Steenwijkerland, a village in the east
- Baarlo, Zwartewaterland, a village in the east

== See also ==
- Baarle, a village spanning the Belgium–Netherlands border
