= Siege of Hasselt (1657) =

1657 siege of the town Hasselt during a 'civil war'

- Part of the civil war in Overijssel
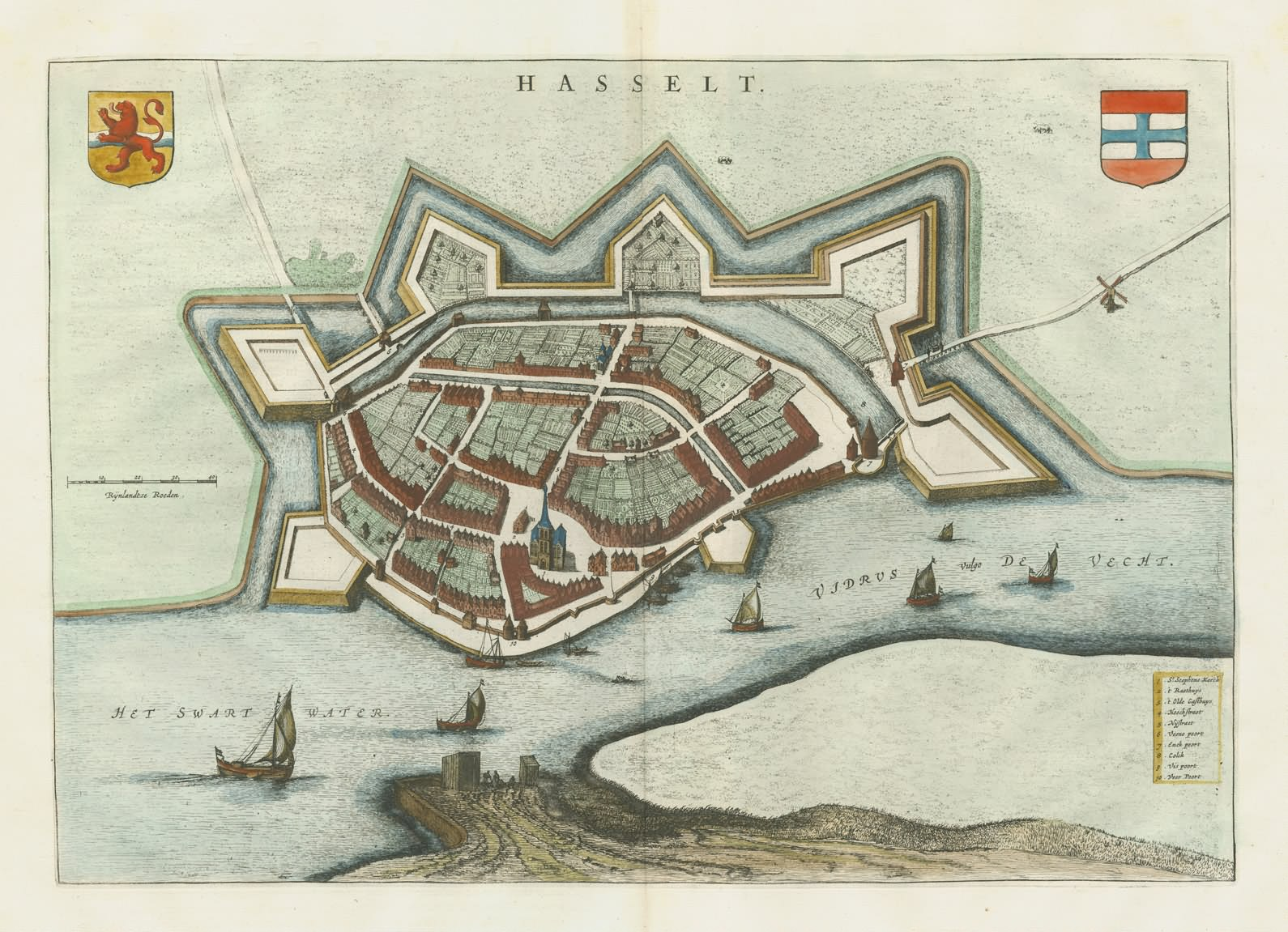
- Depiction of the city of Hasselt, 1649
Date	25–28 May 1657
Location	Hasselt, Overijssel
Result	Inconclusive: Capture of the city by Zwolle; Eventual political defeat for Zwolle after the Negotiations

Belligerents
Zwolle; Kampen	Deventer

Commanders and leaders
Hiddo van Voerst	Coppier van Couleburgh

Strength
Hundreds	Unknown

The siege of Hasselt was the 3 day siege of the city of Hasselt located in the province of Overijssel. The siege took place between the 25th to 28th May of 1657 and was part of a small civil war in the province of Overijssel.

== Background ==
Negotiations between the two parties began as early as January 1656, the first proposal was that the Stadtholder of Friesland would distance himself from the stadtholderate of Overijssel and that the earlier terms proposed in Overijssel made in April 1654 were to be declared as 'invalid', including the appointments of Rutger van Haerscholte. The parties were asked to negotiate with each other and create a regulation regarding the distribution of offices.

The negotiations however, did not go as planned. Because the tensions between both sides kept rising instead of declining as a consequence of the collection of taxes in Hasselt. In early 1657, Deventer was responsible of collecting taxes and port fees under its own management. This consequently enraged the people of Zwolle who now had an excuse to take action against their opposing party. And marched towards Hasselt with hundreds of soldiers and armed civilians. This led to the States General being under pressure of a possible civil war within their own country, both parties subsequently appointed their two mediators; Johan de Witt and Cornelis de Graeff.

== Siege ==
Negotiating for Hasselt to prevent a potential conflict between both parties was too late, because the troops from Zwolle and Kampen captured and occupied the outer fortifications, the areas around the Vechte and the redoubt on the 24th of May by armed civilians, and would surrender after the troops from Zwolle and Kampen surrounded the city on the 28th of May.

The siege itself lasted 3 days, but there were 780 shots fired in total. 250 on May 27th, and 280 on the 28th. And in order to protect the Veersteeg, the men of the city built large walls in front of the gate.

The shots from both sides were responded to in a 'vigorous way'. And one of the men of the city, named Jan Ter Linden who was 80 years old died after standing on top of the bulwark, called the 'Houten Wambuis' due to canon fire. Along with another young child. The council of the city, whilst awaiting a relief force by Deventer (Note: The relief force never came during the siege) consulted with the municipality in which the guilds were called upon. A solution came in which the counciled called for a truce and that the Mayors of the town to negotiate with the Field deputies. However the truce for a truce was rejected. And the city had to surrender.

== Aftermath ==
Although a minor siege, the siege of Hasselt was costly for the Dutch Republic and its economy. The siege cost 11.625 Guilders in terms of damage towards the town's buildings, with merchants paying 2.000 Guilders as tax.

The civil war in Overijssel came to an end after Johan de Witt made negotiations between the two parties in the Hague. During these negotiations, the representatives of Hasselt which included Arnold Waterham, Joan Studich, van Kemnade and Thijmen Telvoren would get the news that their rights were confirmed, but their desire of 'Expansion' was out of question. But the damages that the siege caused were to be compensated by the Dutch government. And because the negotiations were made in the form of a government regulation and amnesty scheme meant a political defeat for Zwolle.

The city of Hasselt would be besieged and captured again by the forces of the Prince-Bishopric of Münster led by Christoph Bernhard von Galen during the Second Münster War.

== Sources ==
- Haverkate, Jan (2021). Spindoctors van de Gouden Eeuw, Een vergeten pamfletoorlog (1654 - 1675) (E-book ed.). Amsterdam University Press. ISBN 9789462497306.
- Schmidt, F.W (2020). "Hasselt vestingstad" (PDF).
- Ebinge Wubben, F.A (1861). Geschiedenis van het beleg der stad Hasselt in den jare 1657 (E-book ed.). L. Nijholt.
