= Willem van Schaik =

Dutch microbiologist

Willem van Schaik (born 18 February 1975) is a Dutch microbiologist. He is professor of Microbiology and Infection at the University of Birmingham.

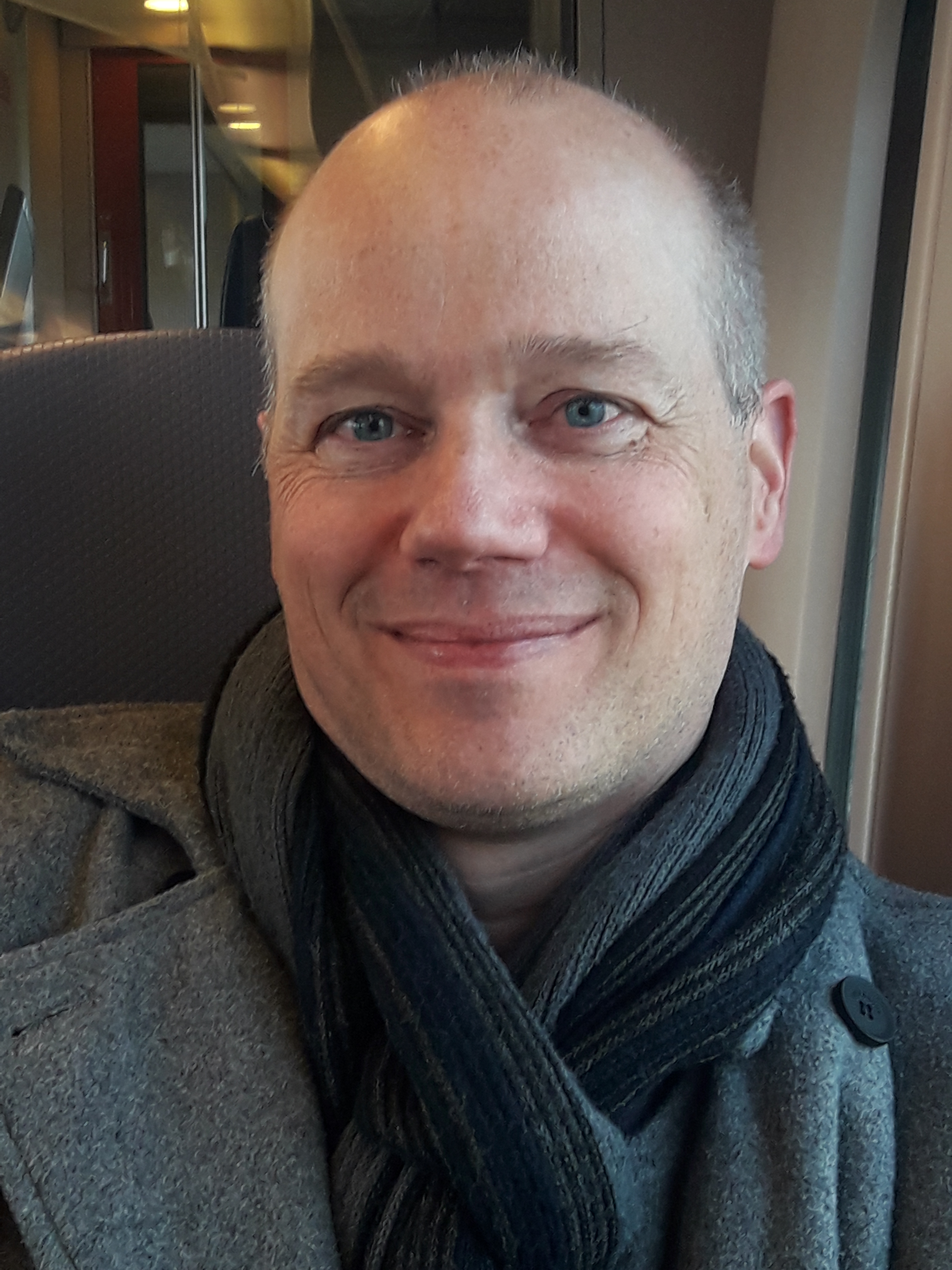
Prof. Willem van Schaik

== Biography ==
Van Schaik was born 18 February 1975 in Hasselt, Overijssel in The Netherlands. He received his M.Sc. and PhD in microbiology both with honour at Wageningen University and Research Centre. After his PhD, Van Schaik obtained a European Molecular Biology Organization (EMBO) long-term fellowship for a postdoctoral project at the Pasteur Institute in France, followed by a senior scientist position at Utrecht University Medical Center in the Netherlands. Since 2017, he holds the chair of Microbiology and Infection at the Institute of Microbiology and Infection at the University of Birmingham. Also in 2017, he obtained a Royal Society Wolfson Research Merit Award.

His research focuses on bacterial pathogen drug resistance, including to antibiotics. His Birmingham research group combines experimental tools in molecular biology and biochemistry with novel DNA sequencing technologies and bioinformatics.
