= Windesheim =

The name Windesheim may refer to:

- Windesheim, Netherlands, a place in the Netherlands, near Zwolle
- the Christelijke Hogeschool Windesheim, an institution of higher education there
- the Augustianian abbey there, which gave its name to the Congregation of Windesheim
- Windesheim, Germany, a place in Rhineland-Palatinate, Germany
