= Weetman =

Weetman is both a surname and a given name. Notable people with the name include:

- Harry Weetman (1920–1972), English professional golfer
- Weetman Harold Miller Pearson, 2nd Viscount Cowdray, DL (1882–1933), British peer and Liberal Party politician
- Weetman Pearson, 1st Viscount Cowdray GCVO, PC (1856–1927), British engineer, oil industrialist, benefactor and Liberal politician

== See also ==
- Witman
