= Halfweg (disambiguation) =

Halfweg (Dutch for "halfway") is the name of several villages in the Netherlands and a place in South Africa:

- Halfweg, North Holland, located on the Haarlemmertrekvaart halfway between Amsterdam and Haarlem
- Halfweg (Beemster), North Holland
- Halfweg (Overijssel)
- Halfweg (South Holland), located on the Leidsevaart halfway between Leiden and Haarlem
- Halfweg (Friesland)
- Halfweg (Northern Cape, South Africa), located half way on the Sishen–Saldanha railway line as a crew change place for the train driver and train driver assistants.
