= Gerner =

Gerner is a surname of English and German origin. Notable people with the surname include:

- Andreas Gerner (1698–1749), Danish naval officer
- Gebhard Gerner (1902–1991), Liechtenstein politician
- Henrik Gerner (1742–1787), Danish naval officer
- Henrik Gerner (bishop) (1629–1700), Danish Lutheran bishop
- Ingrid Hassler-Gerner (born 1947), Liechtenstein politician
- Kristian Gerner (1942–2026), Swedish historian, author, and academic
- Leo Gerner (1912–1981), Liechtenstein politician
- Maximilian Gerner (born 1998), German politician
- Viktoria Gerner, Liechtensteiner footballer
