= HMS Augusta (1736) =

Ship of the line of the Royal Navy

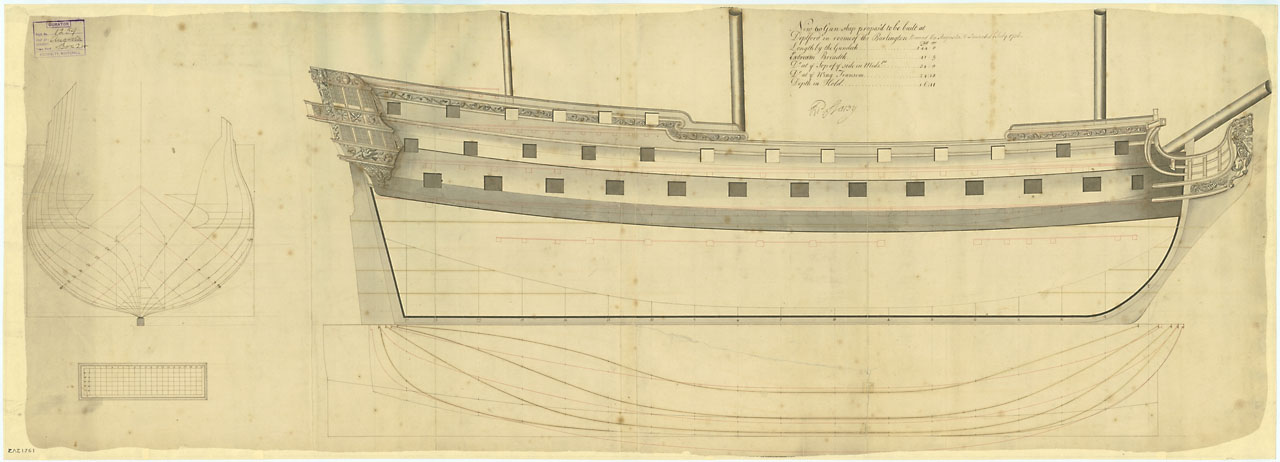
- Augusta

History

Great Britain
- Name: HMS Augusta
- Ordered: 4 September 1733
- Builder: Deptford Dockyard
- Launched: 1 July 1736
- Fate: Broken up, 1765

General characteristics
- Class & type: 1733 proposals 60-gun fourth rate ship of the line
- Tons burthen: 1067
- Length: 144 ft (43.9 m) (gundeck)
- Beam: 41 ft 5 in (12.6 m)
- Depth of hold: 16 ft 11 in (5.2 m)
- Propulsion: Sails
- Sail plan: Full-rigged ship
- Armament: 60 guns: Gundeck: 24 × 24-pounders; Upper gundeck: 26 × 9-pounders; Quarterdeck: 8 × 6-pounders; Forecastle: 2 × 6-pounders

HMS Augusta was a 60-gun fourth-rate ship of the line of the Royal Navy, built to the 1733 proposals of the 1719 Establishment at Deptford Dockyard, and launched on 1 July 1736.

Augusta was active in the Caribbean during the Seven Years' War. Arthur Forrest became the ship's commander in 1757. On 23 December 1757 she sighted an armed 9-ship French convoy off of Haiti, which was disguised under neutral Dutch flags. The convoy, led by the 32-gun Le Mars, wrongly assumed Augusta was a Dutch warship. Forrest fired a broadside at Le Mars that resulted in the ship's surrender, as well as the capitulation of the entire convoy. Forrest and Augusta captured the 400-ton French ship Pallas after a 5-day chase in October 1758. The prize, laden with oil, wine, and other goods, was valued at over two million livres.

Augusta served until 1765, when she was broken up.

This British ship served as the inspiration to Danish shipbuilder Andreas Gerner in designing the 50-gun ship-of-the-line HDMS Fyen. Senior lieutenant A Gerner had been impressed by Augusta's sailing qualities while he was on a study tour of Britain during the 1730s.
