= Maximilian Gerner =

German politician (born 1998)

Member of the Landtag of Baden-Württemberg
- Incumbent
- Assumed office 11 May 2026

Personal details
- Born: 1998 (age 27–28)
- Party: Alternative for Germany (since 2017)

Maximilian Gerner (born 1998) is a German politician who was elected member of the Landtag of Baden-Württemberg in 2026. From 2022 to 2026, he served as advisor to the Alternative for Germany group in the Landtag committee on environment, climate and energy.
