= Wiene =

Wiene is a surname. Notable people with the surname include:

- Conrad Wiene, German film director
- Robert Wiene (1873–1938), German film director, screenwriter and producer
