= Andreas Gerner =

Danish naval officer

Andreas Gerner was a Danish naval officer who was also employed in the building of ships for the Royal Dano-Norwegian Navy.

== Personal ==
Gerner was the grandson of Henrik Gerner, the bishop of Viborg and the father of Henrik Gerner, the fabrikmester shipbuilder. Kommandørkaptajn (Note: Equivalent to Commander - see Ranks and insignia of NATO navies' officers) Gerner was born in 1698 and died in 1749.

== Career ==
In 1735 Andreas Gerner was sent abroad as a senior lieutenant to study shipbuilding, and on return he was entrusted with the building of some ships (but never achieved the top post of fabrikmester to the Royal Danish navy). In 1746 he bought three snows in England.

His largest ship, the ship-of-the-line Fyen of 50 guns, was deemed unsuitable for use with the fleet even while it was still on the stocks and so it was transferred to the Danish East India Company. In this capacity the design proved a great success and copied for future armed trading vessels. Notes attached to the ships plans indicate that Fyen's design was inspired by the British ship HMS Augusta (1736) at Deptford.

On his deathbed, he is recorded as having warned his sons not to have a career in shipbuilding, as this was a sure way to lose a fortune. His son Henrik did not heed this advice and became a very successful fabrikmester.

== Citations ==
- This article includes information gleaned from the Danish Wikipedia pages da:Fabrikmester and da:Henrik Gerner (skibskonstruktør)
- Project Runeberg: Dansk biografisk Lexikon /Vol 5. Faaborg - Gersdorff / p 614 (1887–1905) Author: Carl Frederik Bricka
- Gjødesen, P.F. (1900) Mindeskrift om Henrik Gerner. Publisher Denmark : Sølieutenants-Selskabet (contains details of Andreas)
