= Baarlo, Zwartewaterland =

Baarlo
- hamlet
- Location in the Netherlands Baarlo (Netherlands)
- Coordinates: 52°39′47″N 6°6′20″E
- Country: Netherlands
- Province: Overijssel
- Municipality: Kampen; Zwartewaterland; Zwolle
- Elevation: 1 m (3.3 ft)
- Time zone: UTC+1 (CET)
  - Summer (DST): UTC+2 (CEST)
- Postal code: 8064
- Dialing code: 038

Baarlo is a small village in the eastern Netherlands. It is located in the municipality Zwartewaterland, Overijssel, about 4 km northeast of the town of Zwartsluis.

The village lies on the Meppelerdiep canal between Zwartsluis and Meppel. The village is not a statistical entity, and the postal authorities have placed it under Zwartsluis. In 1840, it was home to 75 people. Nowadays, the population is estimated at 20.

There is another village with the same name in Overijsel, about 15 km to the northwest.
