= Baarlo, Steenwijkerland =

Baarlo
- Hamlet
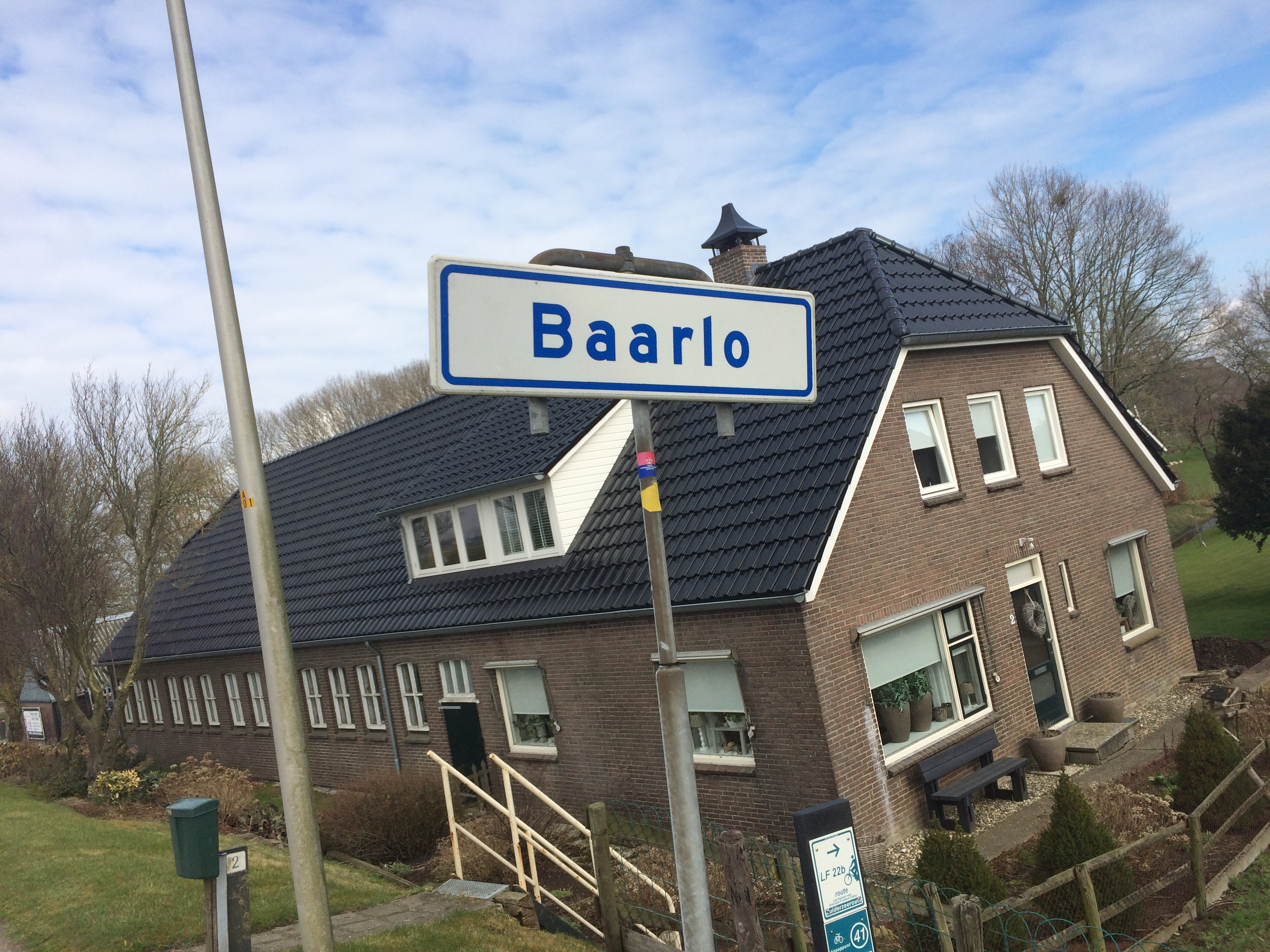

- Location in the Netherlands Baarlo (Netherlands)
- Coordinates: 52°44′18″N 5°57′0″E
- Country: Netherlands
- Province: Overijssel
- Municipality: Steenwijkerland

Area
  - Total: 3.95 km^{2} (1.53 sq mi)
- Elevation: 0 m (0 ft)

Population (2021)
  - Total: 45
  - Density: 11/km^{2} (30/sq mi)
- Time zone: UTC+1 (CET)
  - Summer (DST): UTC+2 (CEST)
- Postal code: 8372
- Dialing code: 0527

Baarlo is a hamlet in the Dutch province of Overijssel. It is located in the municipality Steenwijkerland, about 1 km northwest of the city of Blokzijl.

It was first mentioned in 1219 as Barlo, and means "barren forest". During the Middle Ages, it used to have a chapel, which was damaged in a 1825 flood, and demolished in 1836. Until the Noordoostpolder was reclaimed, the village lay on the dyke of the IJsselmeer. In 1840, it was home to 145 people.

Baarlo should not be confused with a village with the same name in the municipality of Zwartewaterland, about 15 km to the southeast.
