= Zuideinde, Overijssel =

Zuideinde
- Hamlet
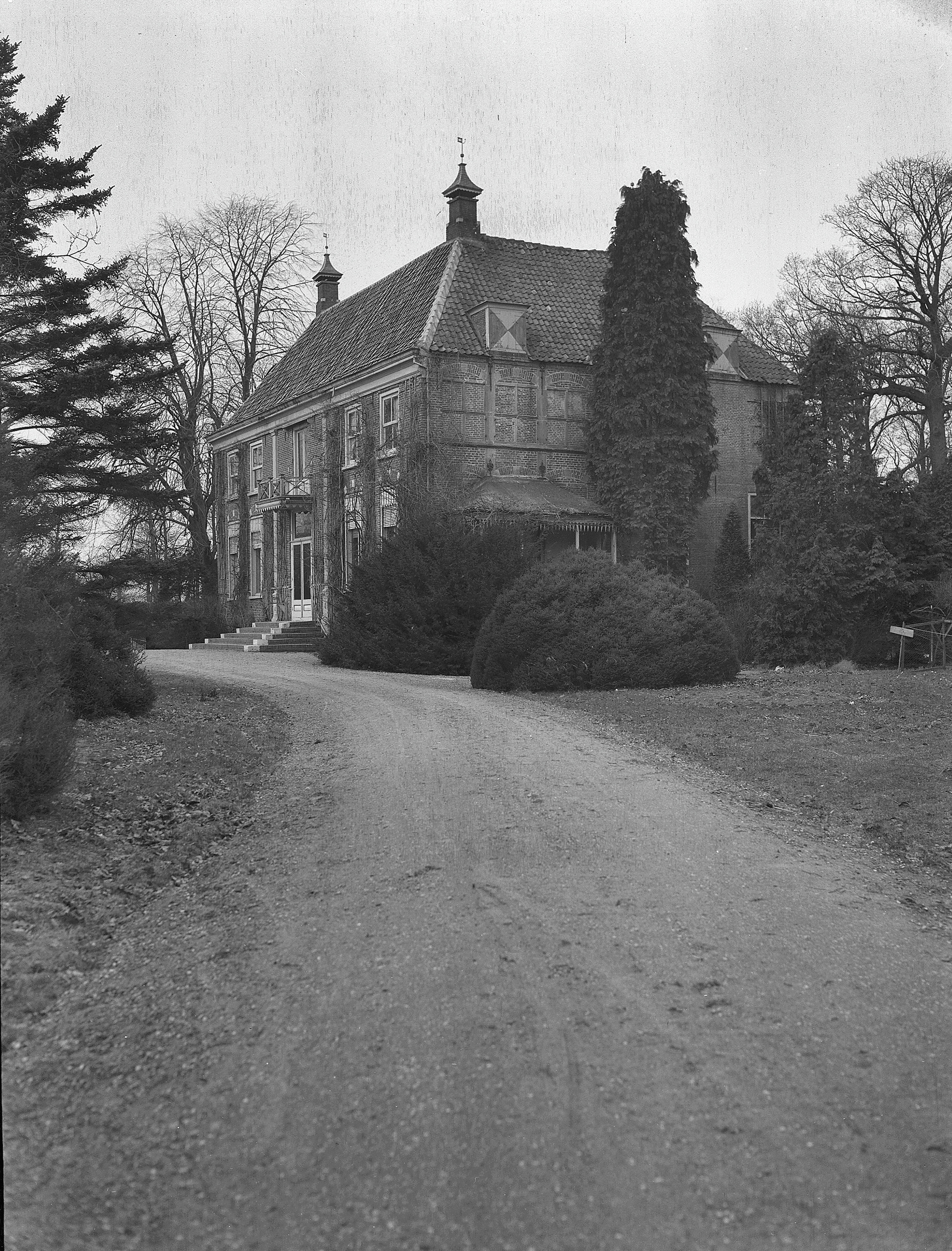
- Huis Wittenstein

- Location in the Netherlands Zuideinde (Netherlands)
- Coordinates: 52.4822°N 5.9306°E
- Country: Netherlands
- Province: Overijssel; Gelderland
- Municipality: Kampen; Oldebroek
- Elevation: 2 m (6.6 ft)
- Time zone: UTC+1 (CET)
  - Summer (DST): UTC+2 (CEST)
- Postal code: 8278
- Dialing code: 038

Zuideinde is a hamlet in the Dutch province of Overijssel located in the municipality of Kampen, about 8 km south of that city. Part of the hamlet extends to Oldebroek, Gelderland.

Even though it still has its own place name signs, Zuideinde is considered part of Kamperveen. In 1840, the hamlet was home to 159 people, and today it consists of about 125 houses.

In 1595, the Huis Wittenstein was built in Zuideinde by Johan Witten. In 1615, it became a havezate (manor house). It was demolished in 1938, and replaced by a new building.
