= Mastenbroek =

- Polder and hamlet
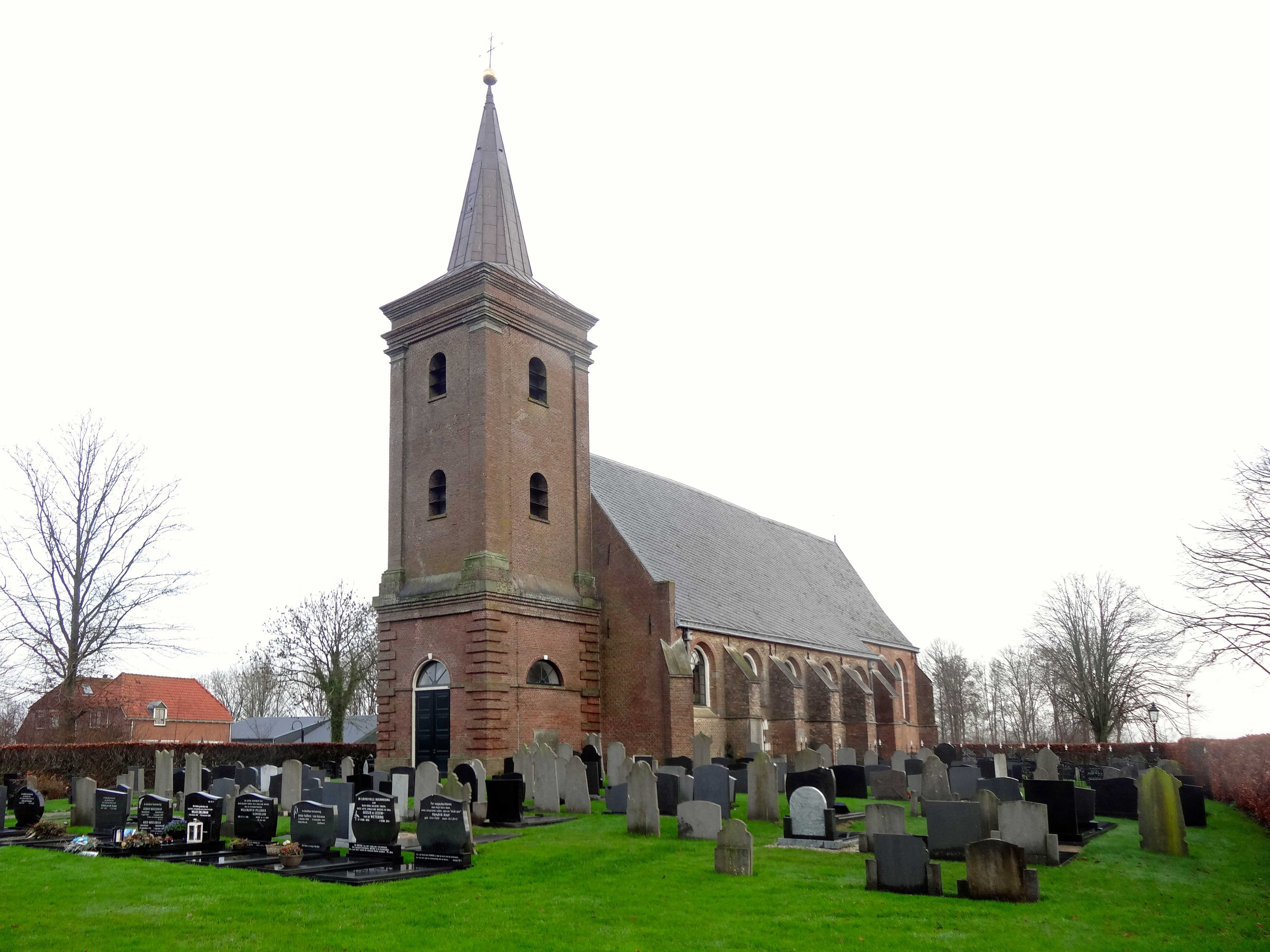
- Church of Mastenbroek

- Location in the Netherlands Mastenbroek (Netherlands)
- Coordinates: 52°34′30″N 6°1′25″E
- Country: Netherlands
- Province: Overijssel
- Municipality: Kampen; Zwartewaterland; Zwolle

Area
  - Total: 11.40 km^{2} (4.40 sq mi)
- Elevation: 0 m (0 ft)

Population (2021)
  - Total: 190
  - Density: 17/km^{2} (43/sq mi)
- Time zone: UTC+1 (CET)
  - Summer (DST): UTC+2 (CEST)
- Postal code: 8294
- Dialing code: 038

Mastenbroek is a polder in the Dutch province of Overijssel. It lies north of the city of Zwolle. "Mastenbroek" is also the name of an hamlet, built around a church in the middle of the polder.

The polder is part of three municipalities: the western part, including the hamlet Bisschopswetering and half of the village of Mastenbroek, lies in Kampen; the southeastern part lies in Zwolle; and the northeastern part, including the hamlet of Nieuwe Wetering and the other half of the village of Mastenbroek, lies in Zwartewaterland. It used to split into six municipalities.

It was first mentioned in 1277 as Mastenbroic. The etymology is unclear. In 1169, it was attested as Vorsterbruc, but that name was reference to the entire wilderness between the IJssel and Zwarte Water. In 1369, a church was built in the hamlet. The current church dates from around 1647. In 1864, the inhabitants petitioned the government to construct a railway station in their hamlet which was initially denied. The stop was built 7 kilometres (4.3 mi) from the village, and closed in 1933.

== Gallery ==
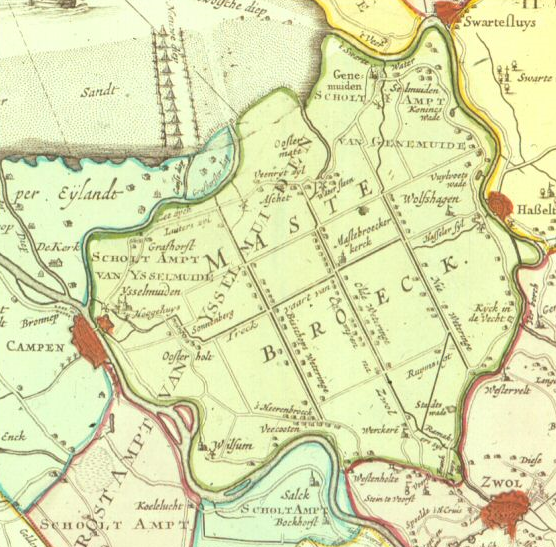
Map of the Mastenbroek polder in about 1750. The village of Mastenbroek can be seen in the middle of the polder ("Mastenbroecker kerck", Mastenbroek church).

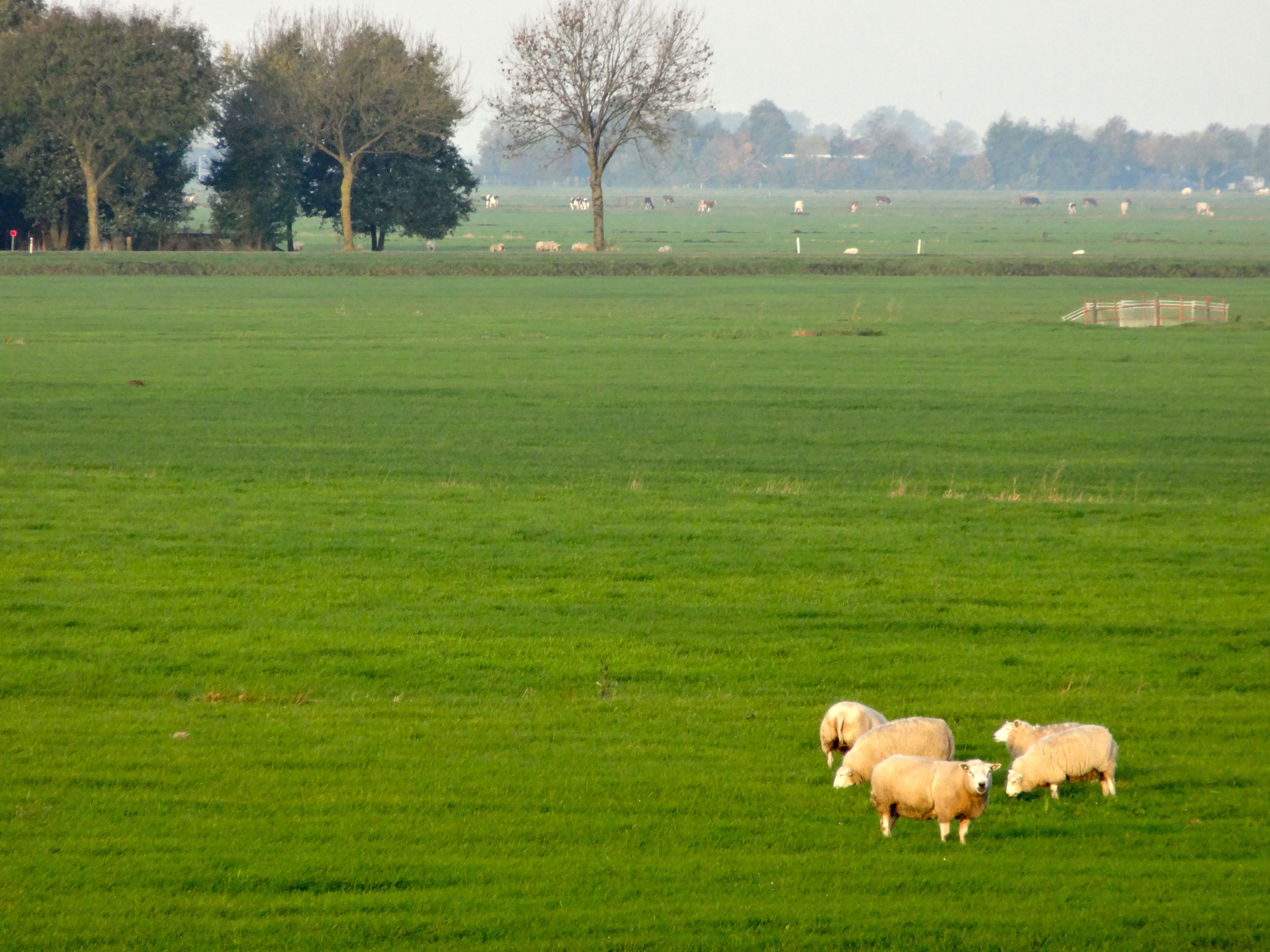
Sheep in the polder
