= Windesheim, Netherlands =

Windesheim
- Village
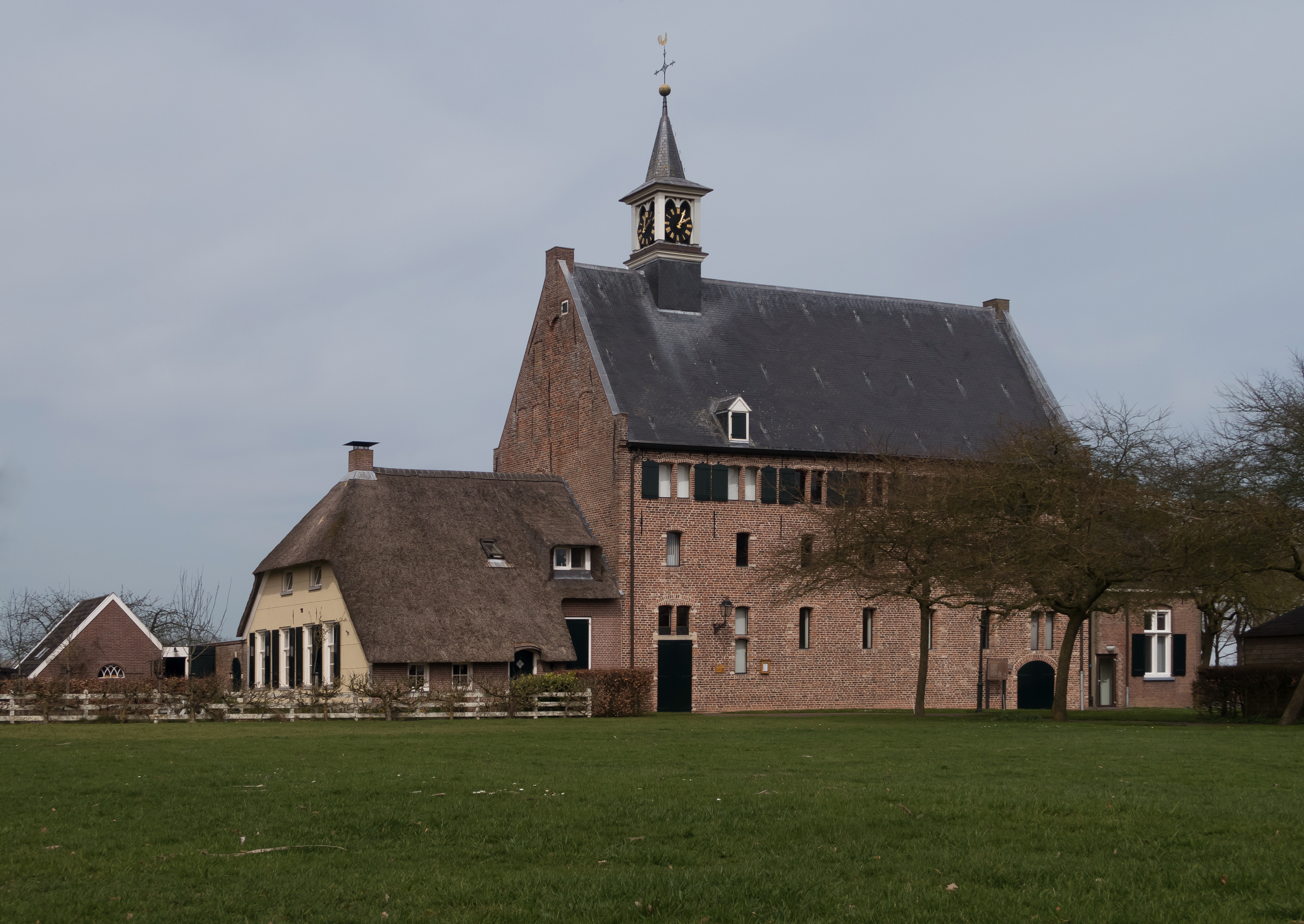
- Protestant church in the former brewery

- Location in the province of Overijssel in the Netherlands Windesheim (Netherlands)
- Coordinates: 52.44731°N 6.13033°E
- Country: Netherlands
- Province: Overijssel
- Municipality: Zwolle

Area
  - Total: 0.53 km^{2} (0.20 sq mi)
- Elevation: 2.0 m (6.6 ft)

Population (2021)
  - Total: 395
  - Density: 750/km^{2} (1,900/sq mi)
- Time zone: UTC+1 (CET)
  - Summer (DST): UTC+2 (CEST)
- Postal code: 8015
- Dialing code: 038

Windesheim is a village in the municipality of Zwolle in the province of Overijssel, Netherlands. The Congregation of Windesheim was located in Windesheim from 1387 until 1577.

== History ==
The village was first mentioned in 1028 as Wendesheim, and means "settlement of Winid (person)". Windesheim is an esdorp which developed in the Late Middle Ages along the road from Zwolle to Deventer.

In 1387, a monastery by the Brethren of the Common Life was established in the village. The first Dutch translation of the New Testament was made in Windesheim in 1390. The Congregation of Windesheim started to establish sister monasteries, and by 1511 was in charge of 97 monasteries throughout the Holy Roman Empire. During the Reformation, many were demolished or closed down. Around 1570, the monastery in Windesheim was destroyed by the Geuzen. In 1577, all possessions of the congregation were seized by the province of Overijssel.

The Dutch Reformed church was built in the former brewery of the monastery. The building dates from around 1565. By 1633, it was converted into a church by removing the floors. Around 1987, the original windows were restored. Several smaller buildings had survived as well, and were reused as clergy house and farms.

The havezate (manor house) Huis Windesheim was built around 1600. The gardens around the estate were designed by Leonard Springer in 1813. During World War II, it was expropriated by the German authorities and used as living quarters for German officers. On 20 October 1944, the estate was bombed by the Royal Air Force, and only ruins remain. The gate house and bridge over the moat still exist. The park which measures 570 hectares (1,400 acres) has been restored.

The grist mill Windesheimer Molen was built in 1748, but is a replacement of earlier wind mills. The first mill was built at the site in 1391 by monks of the monastery. In 1952, the wind mill became property of a foundation and was restored to working order. Since 1978, it is owned by the municipality, and is occasionally in service.

Windesheim was home to 232 people in 1840. Between 1866 until 1936, and 1940 until 1941, there was a railway station in Windesheim on the Arnhem–Leeuwarden railway. The building was demolished in 1962.

Windesheim was part of the municipality of Zwollerkerspel until 31 July 1967 when it was merged into Zwolle. In 1977, the city of Zwolle changed the postal stamps of Windesheim to the curious "Dorpstraat Zwolle" (village street Zwolle). Since 1978, Windesheim is no longer a recognised village by the postal authorities. Nevertheless, it is still a separate village and there is a still significant distance to its neighbouring city.

== Gallery ==
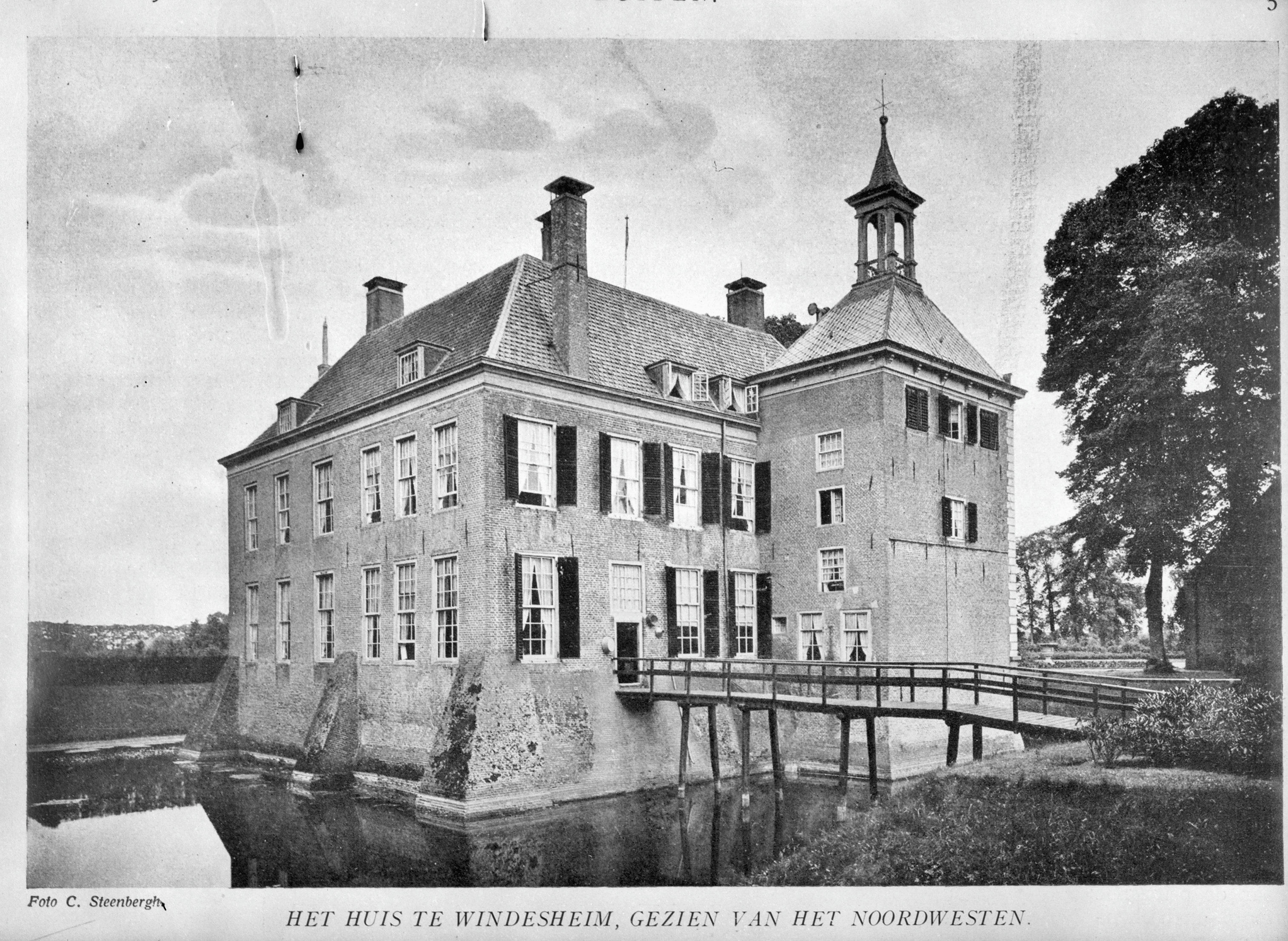
Huis Windesheim (1922)

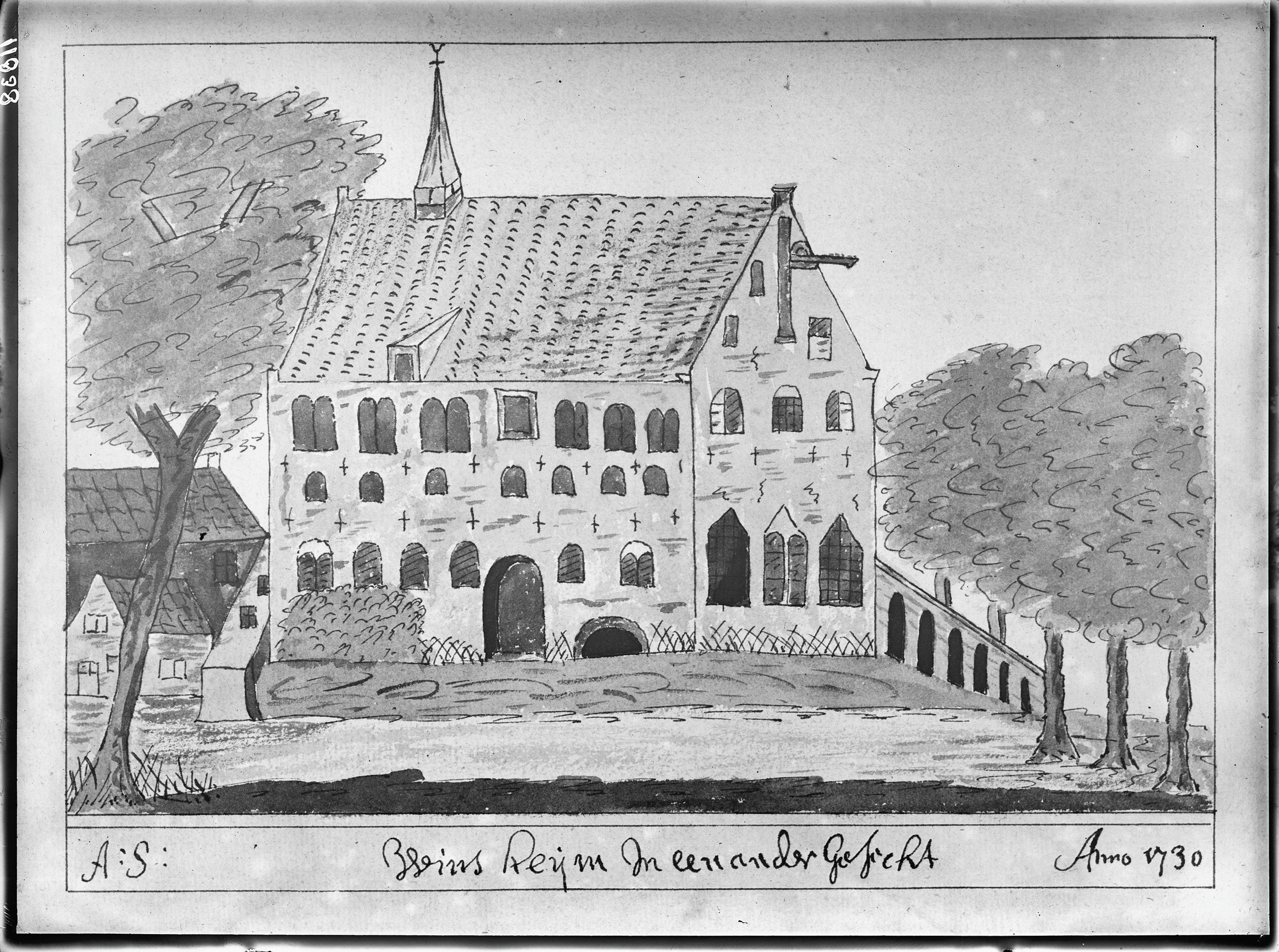
Drawing of the monastery Windesheim (1730)

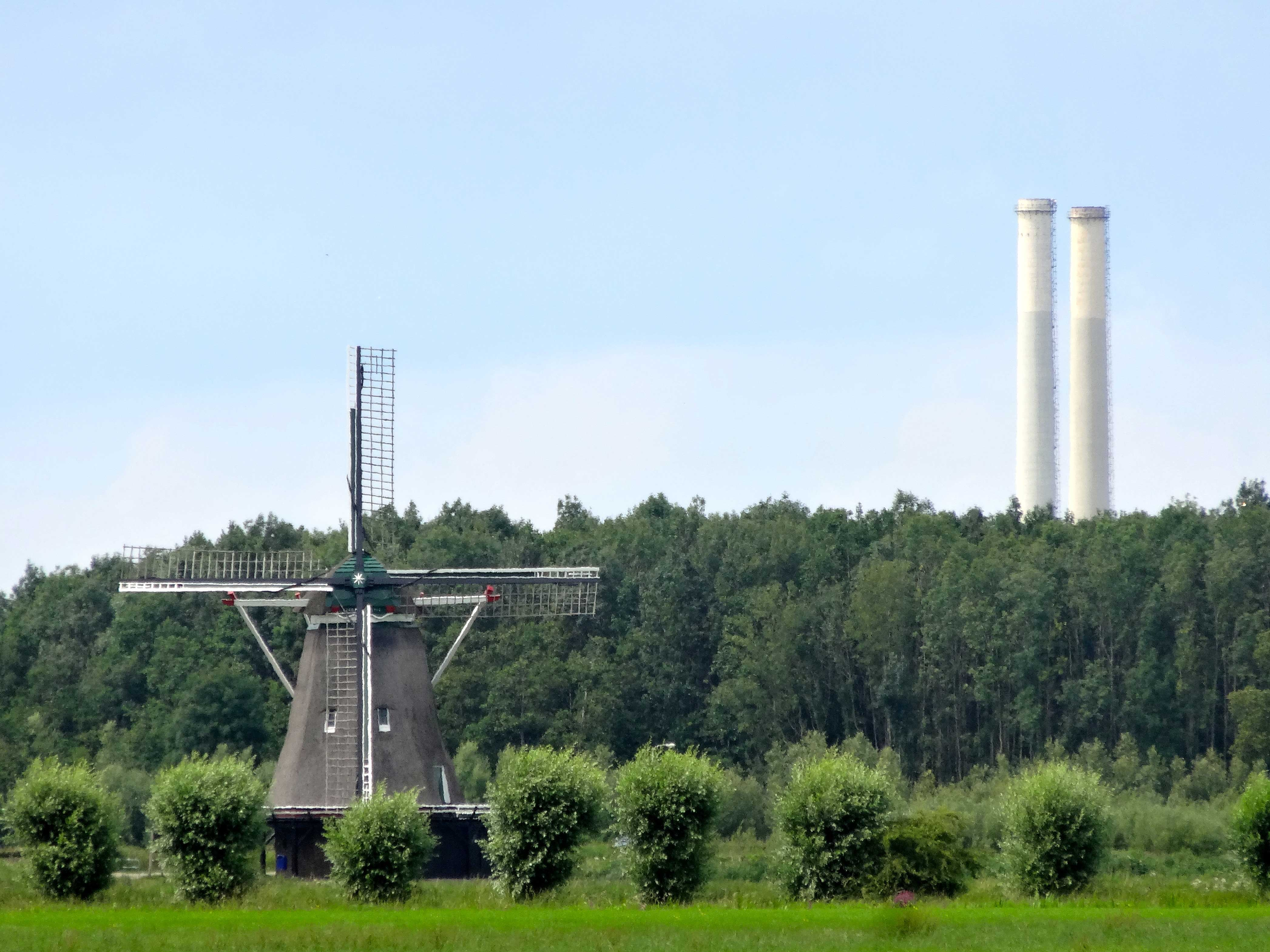
Wind mill Windesheimer molen with a factory in the background
