= Halfweg, Overijssel =

Halfweg
- Interactive map of Halfweg
- Coordinates: 52°39′57″N 6°15′38″E
- Country: Netherlands
- Province: Overijssel
- Municipality: Staphorst
- Postal codes: 7951, 7955
- Area code: 0522

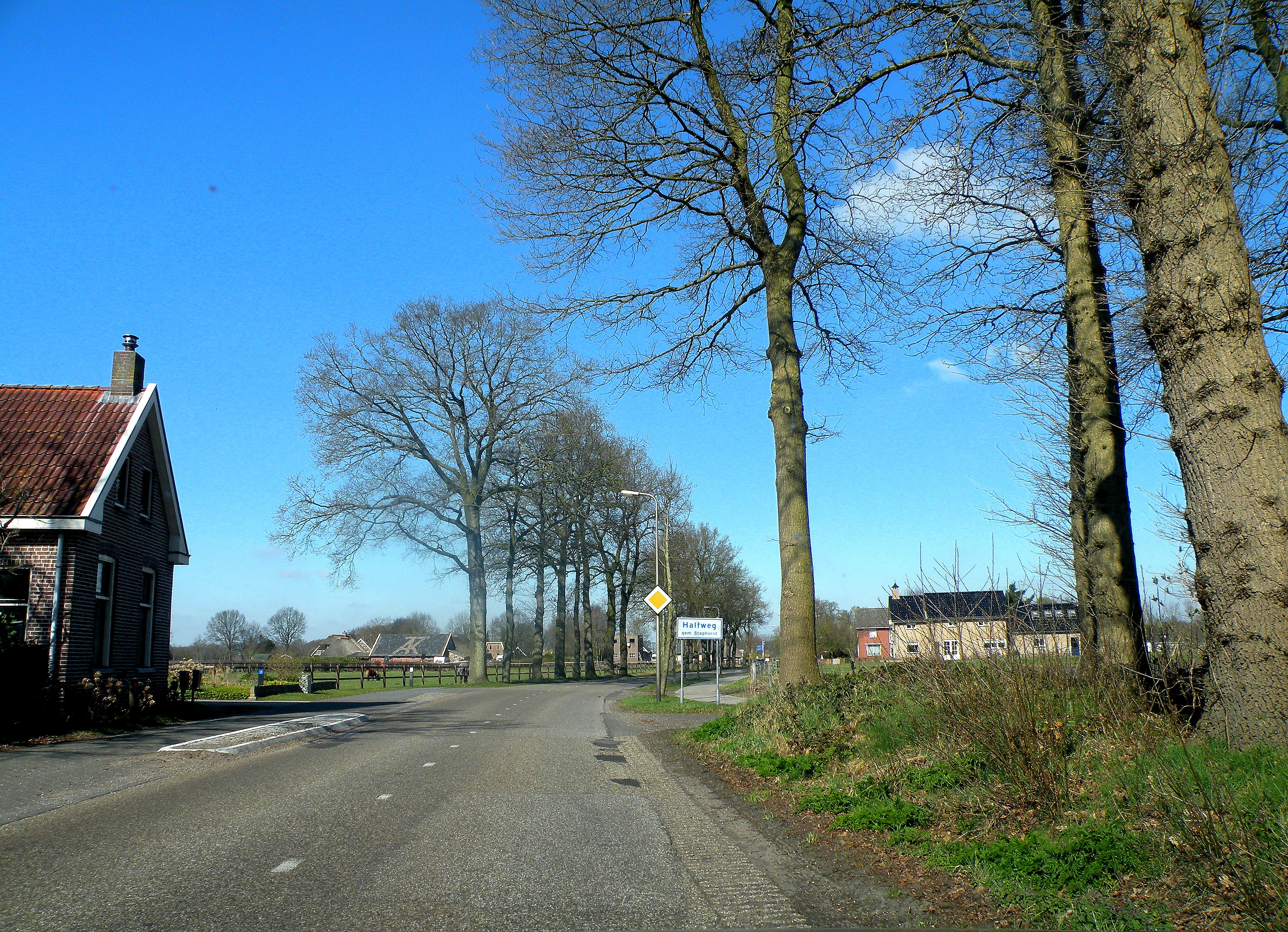
Halfweg (Staphorst) coming from IJhorst

Halfweg is a hamlet in the Dutch province of Overijssel. It is located in the municipality of Staphorst, about 4 km northeast of that town.
