= Witman =

- Hamlet
- Location in province of Overijssel in the Netherlands Witman (Netherlands)
- Coordinates: 52.6294°N 6.5276°E
- Country: Netherlands
- Province: Overijssel
- Municipality: Hardenberg
- Elevation: 9 m (30 ft)
- Time zone: UTC+1 (CET)
  - Summer (DST): UTC+2 (CEST)
- Postal code: 7776
- Dialing code: 0523

Witman is a hamlet in the Dutch province of Overijssel. It is located in the municipality of Hardenberg, about 2 km west of the town of Slagharen.

Witman is not a statistical entity, and the postal authorities have placed it under Slagharen. It was first mentioned between 1830 and 1855 as De Witman, and means "widower". It consists of about 20 houses.
