= Hasselt, Overijssel =

Hasselt
- City
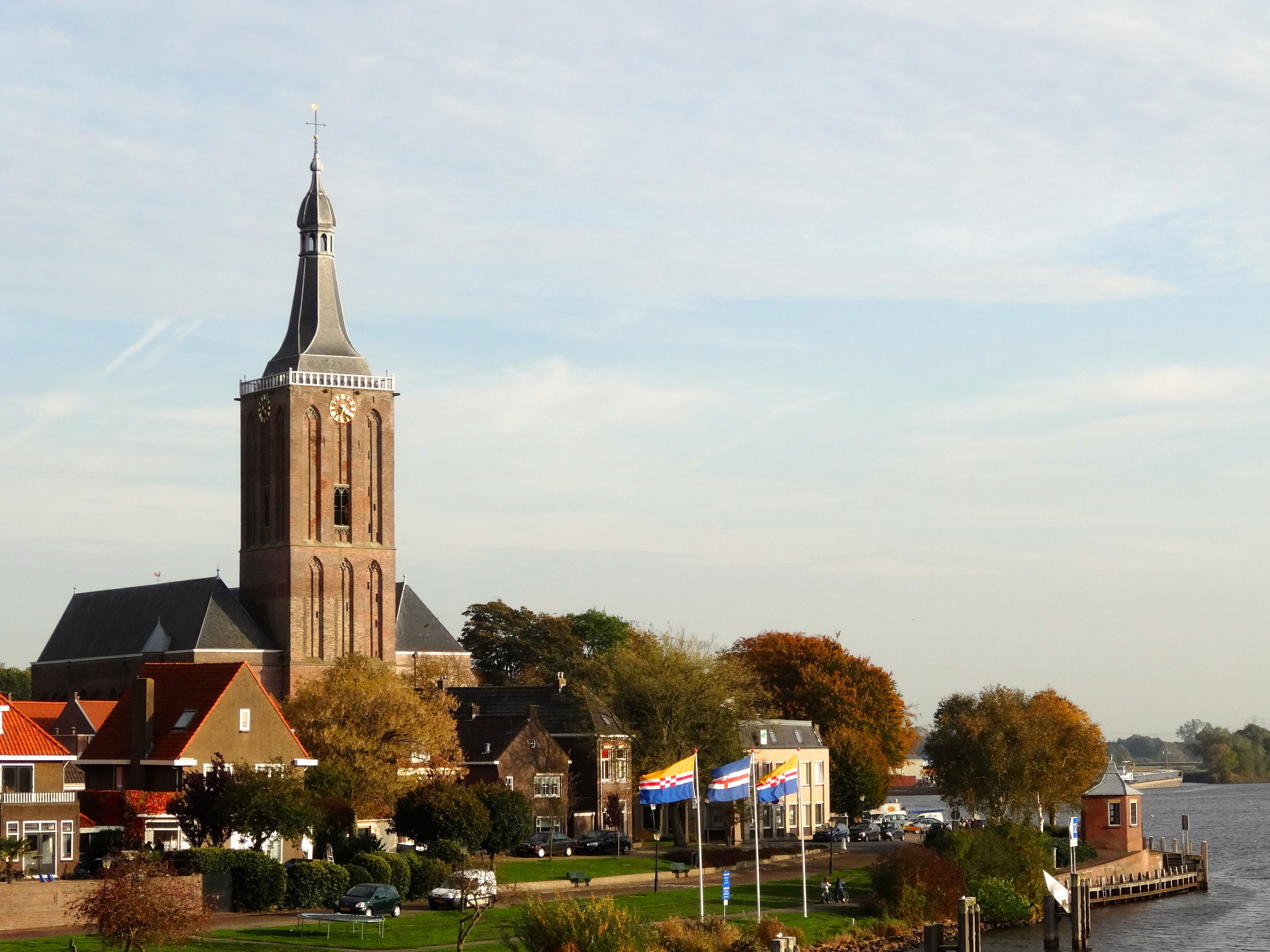
- A view of Hasselt's skyline with St. Stephen's Church

- Flag Coat of arms

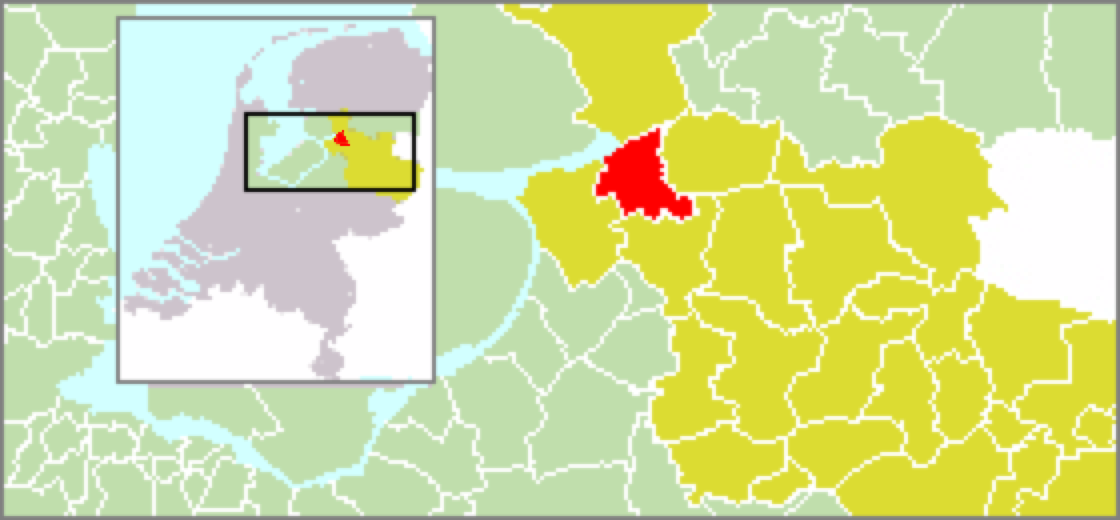

- Location in province of Overijssel in the Netherlands Hasselt (Netherlands)
- Coordinates: 52°35′27″N 6°5′28″E
- Country: Netherlands
- Province: Overijssel
- Municipality: Zwartewaterland

Population (1 January 2021)
  - Total: 7,385
- Source: CBS, Statline.
- Time zone: UTC+1 (CET)
  - Summer (DST): UTC+2 (CEST)

Hasselt is a city in the municipality of Zwartewaterland about 7 km (4.3 mi) north of Zwolle, in the Dutch province of Overijssel. After it received city rights in 1252, it became a member of the Hanseatic League around 1350. The city suffered an economic downfall from about 1550 on, as other cities proved to be better situated and equipped for trade and commerce. In 2001 the municipalities of Hasselt, Genemuiden and Zwartsluis were united in the municipality of Zwartewaterland, of which Hasselt became the administrative centre. As of 1 January 2021, Hasselt had a population of 7,385.

== Gallery ==
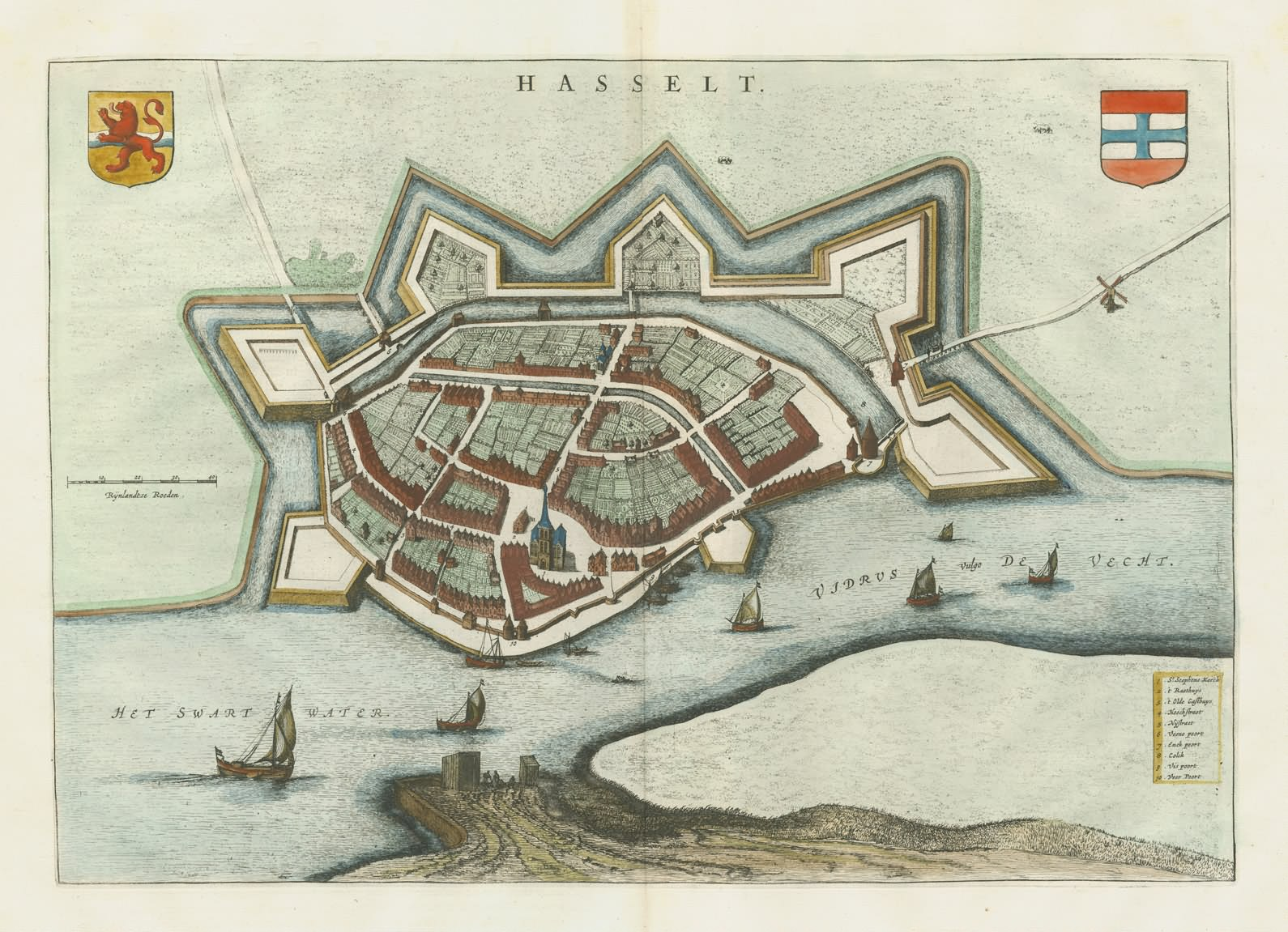
1649 Blaeu map of Hasselt

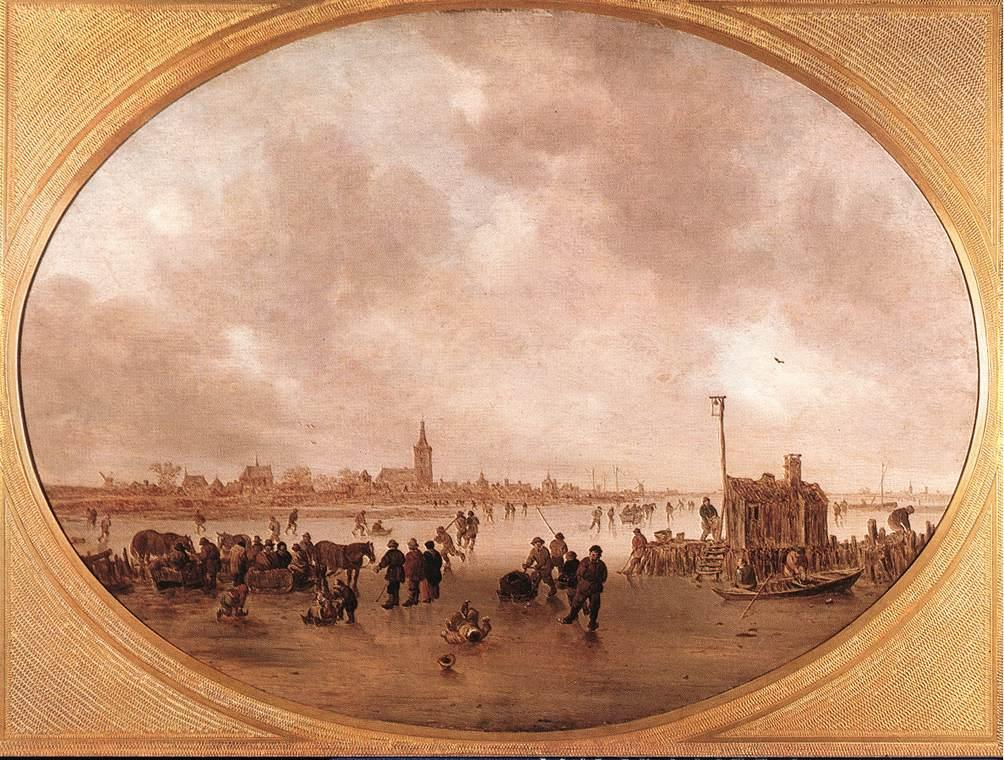
Painting of ice skating in Hasselt, 17th century

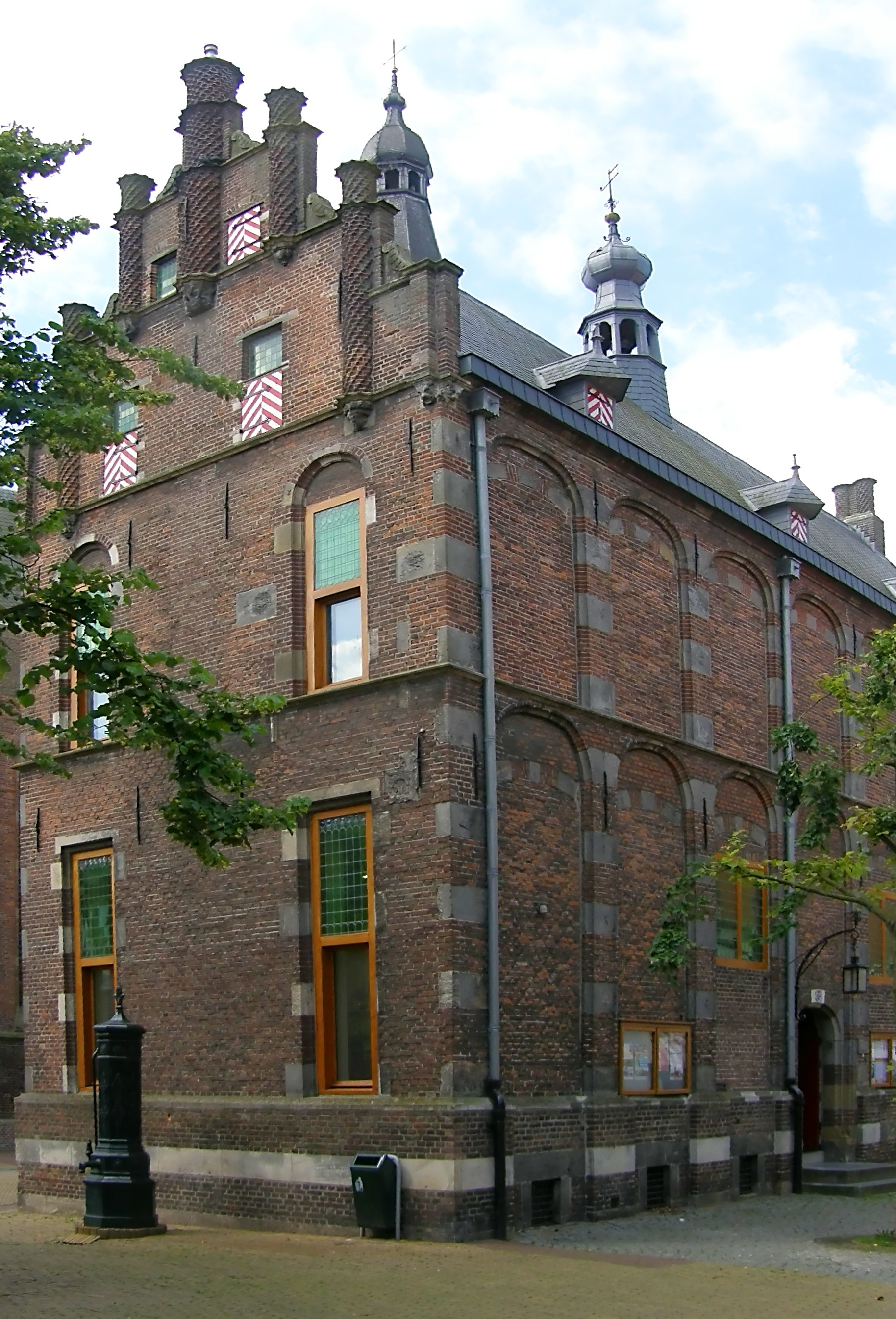
Former city hall (Oude Stadhuis)

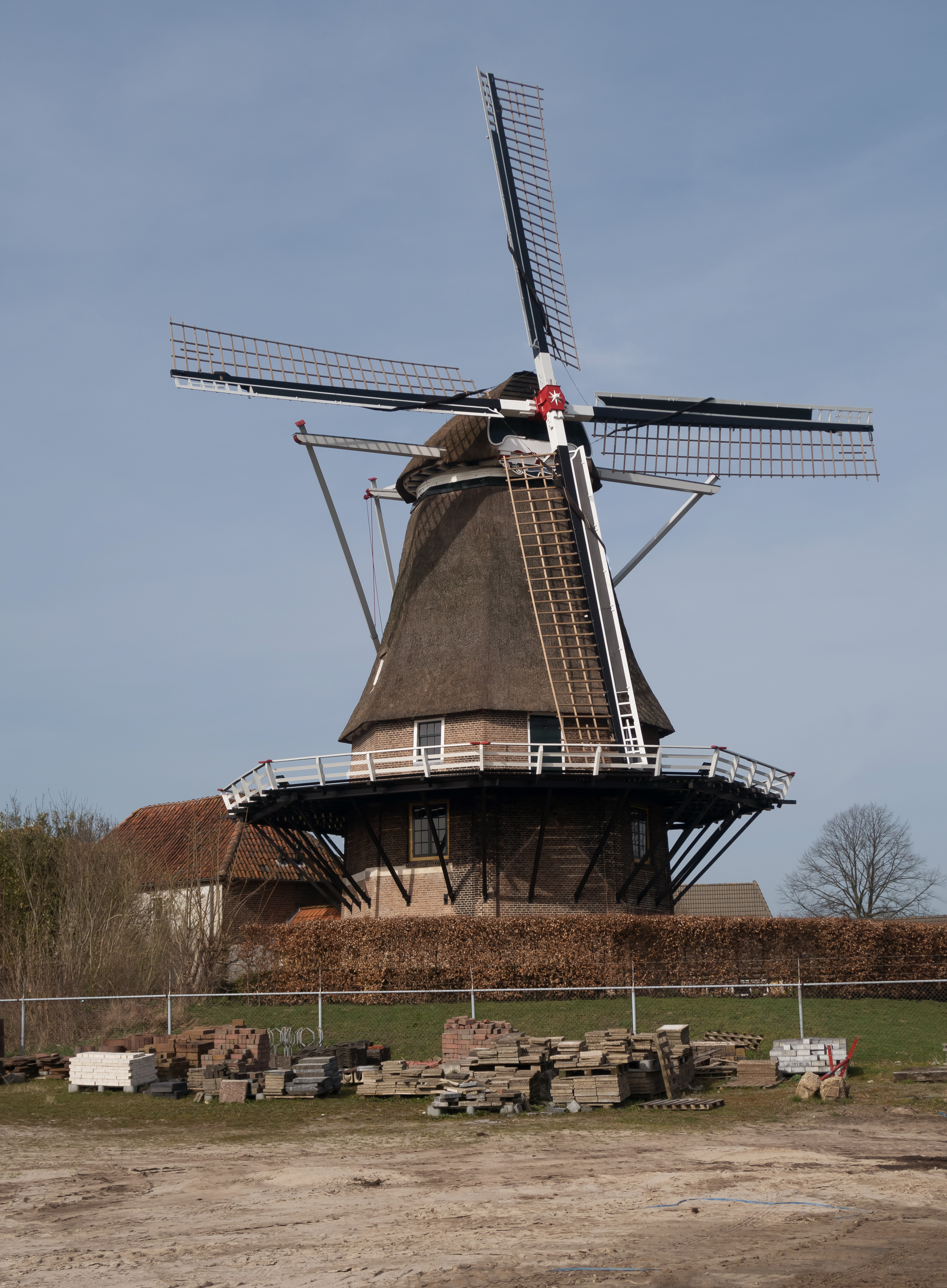
Windmill: Korenmolen de Zwaluw in Hasselt
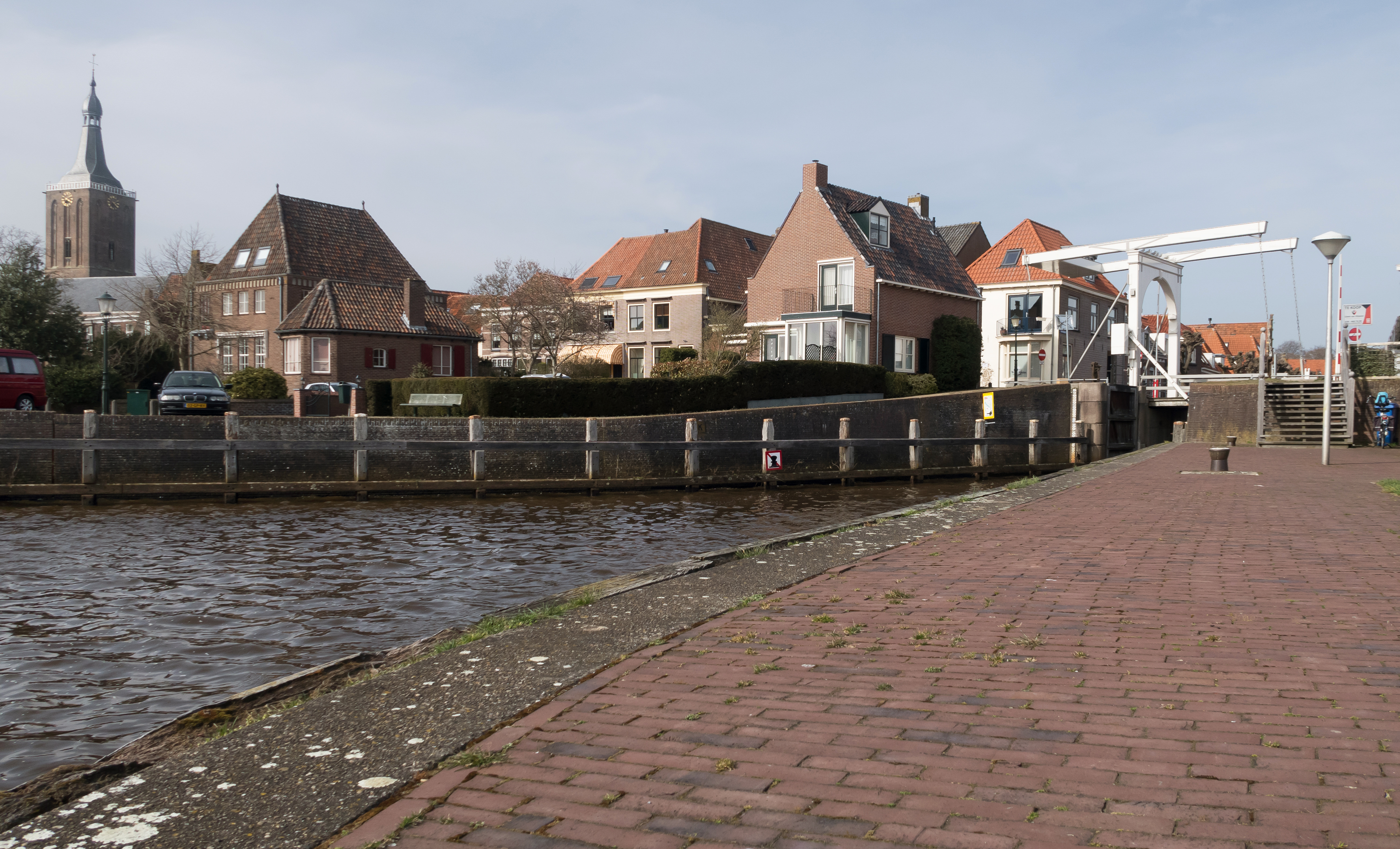
The main church and city centre of Hasselt

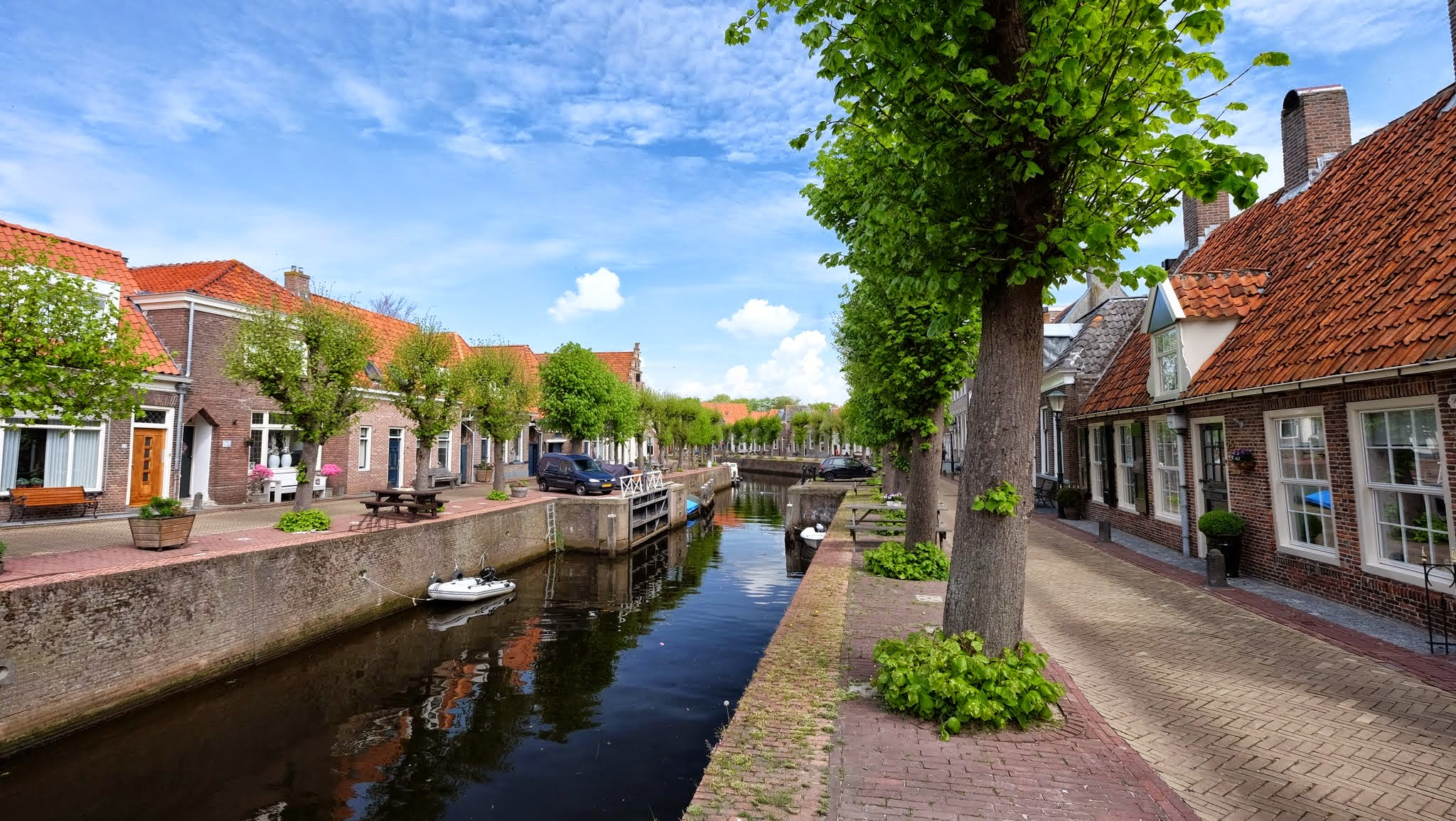
City centre canal

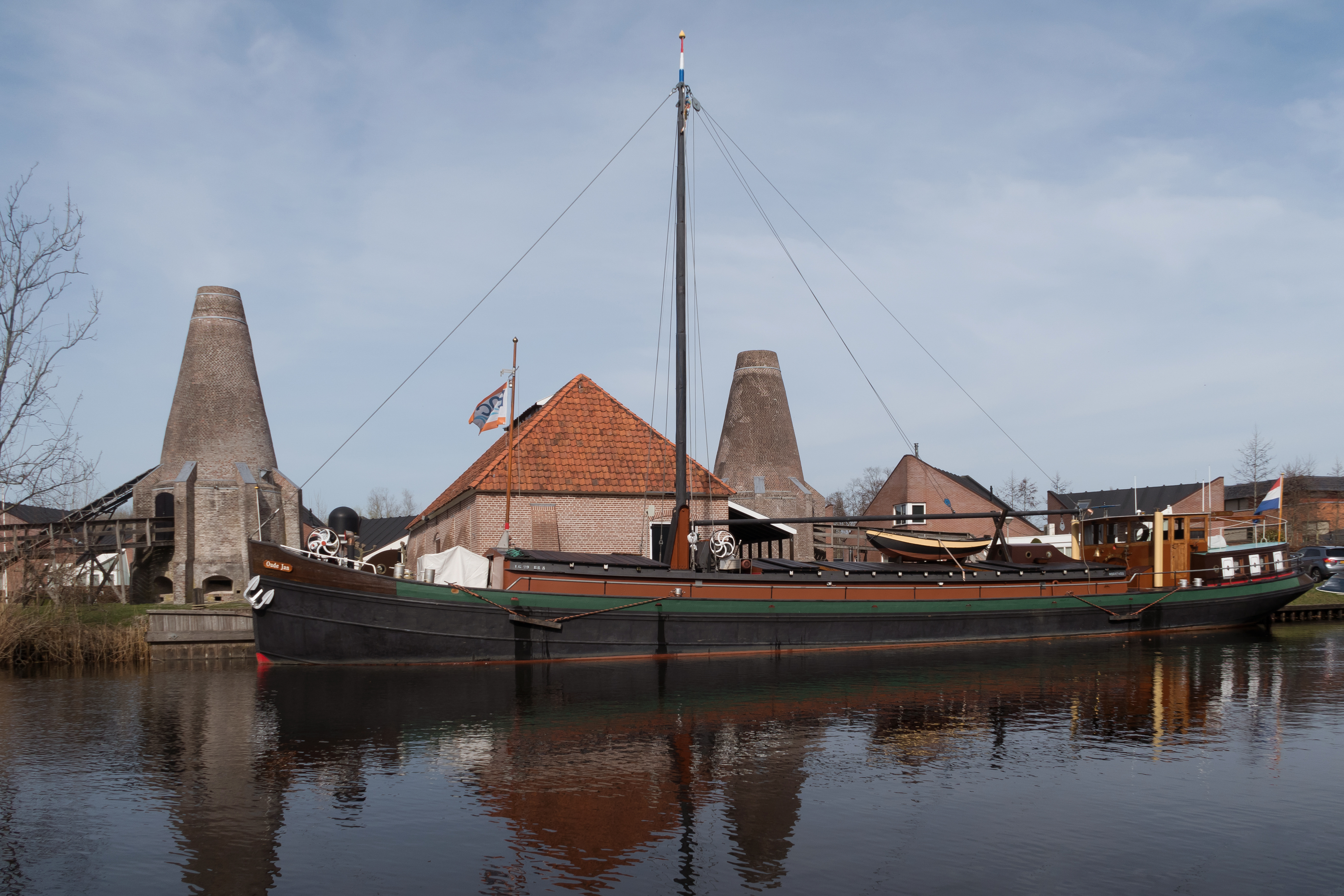
Bed and breakfast with two monumental lime kilns

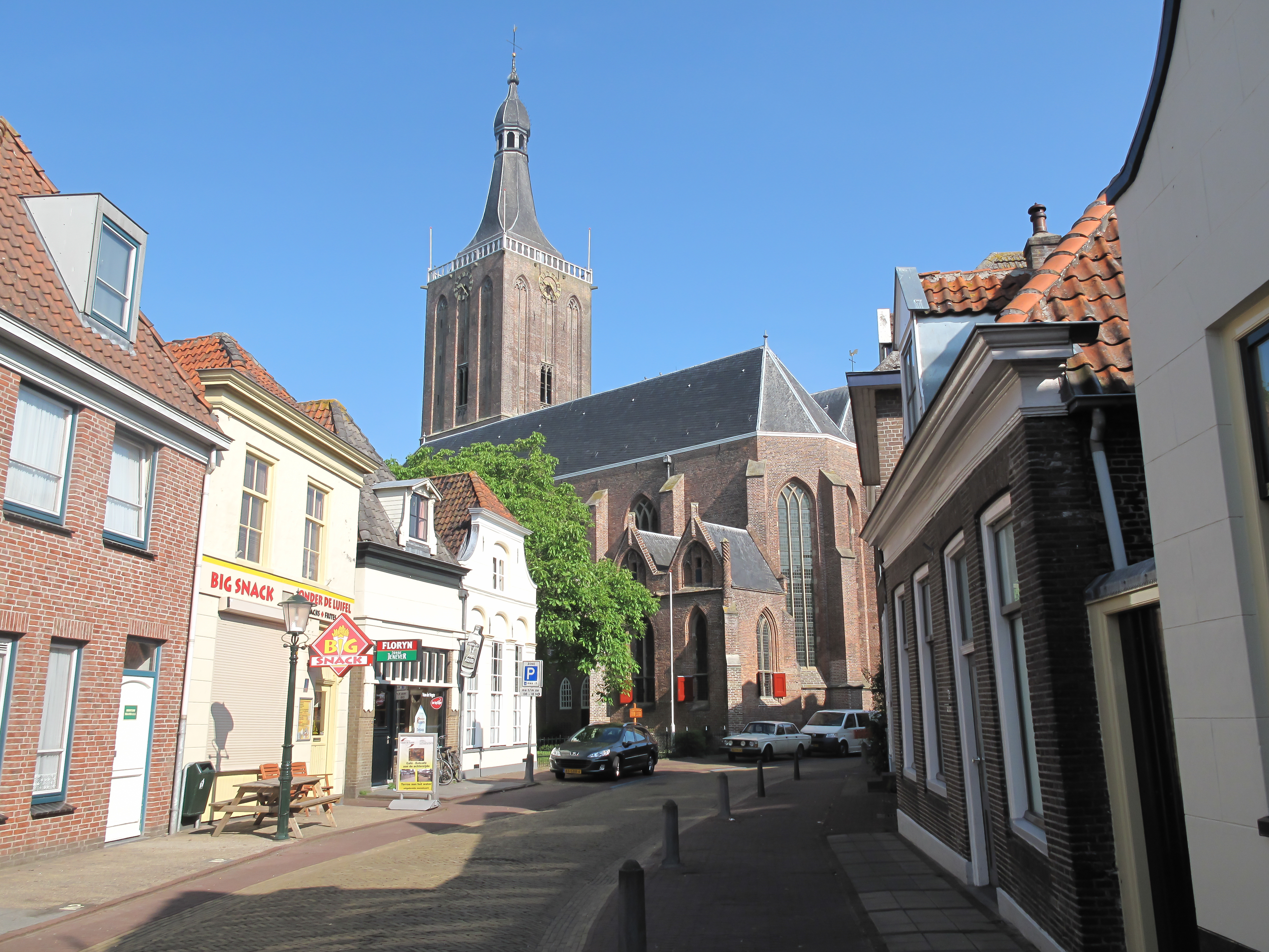
City centre
