= Zwartewaterland =

- Municipality
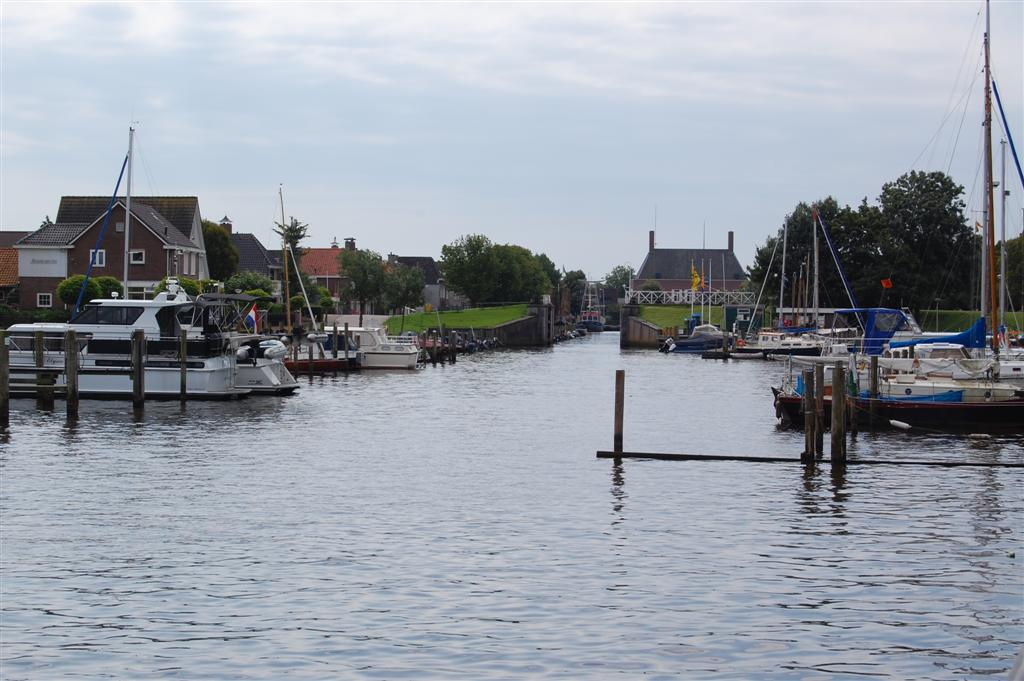
- Harbour of Genemuiden

- Flag Coat of arms

- Location in Overijssel
- Coordinates: 52°35′N 6°6′E
- Country: Netherlands
- Province: Overijssel
- Established: 1 January 2001

Government
  - Body: Municipal council
  - Mayor: Judith Compagner (CDA)

Area
  - Total: 87.86 km^{2} (33.92 sq mi)
  - Land: 82.49 km^{2} (31.85 sq mi)
  - Water: 5.37 km^{2} (2.07 sq mi)
- Elevation: 1 m (3.3 ft)

Population (January 2021)
  - Total: 22,823
  - Density: 277/km^{2} (720/sq mi)
- Time zone: UTC+1 (CET)
  - Summer (DST): UTC+2 (CEST)
- Postcode: 8060–8064, 8280–8299
- Area code: 038
- Website: www.zwartewaterland.nl

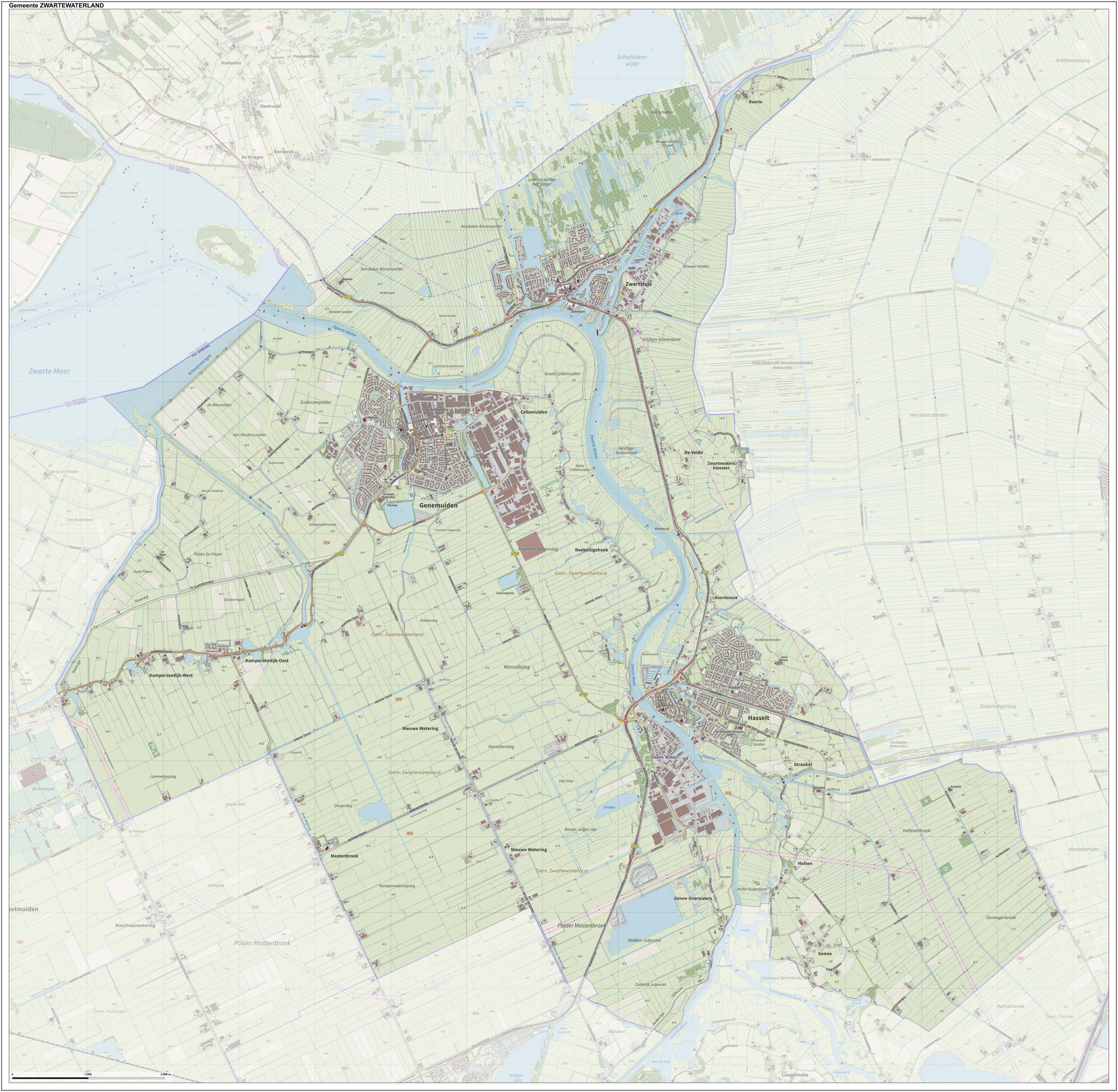
Dutch Topographic map of Zwartewaterland, Sept. 2014

Zwartewaterland (Dutch pronunciation: [ˌzʋɑrtəˈʋaːtərlɑnt]) is a municipality in the province Overijssel in the eastern Netherlands.

== Geography ==
This mainly rural municipality lies south of Steenwijkerland on the Zwarte Water (Black Water). This is a short tributary of the river IJssel from Zwolle to the Zwarte Meer (Black Lake). Before 1931 this lake was a part of the Zuiderzee. The Vecht also flows into the Zwarte Water. Hasselt lies about 5 km (3.1 mi) north of Zwolle.

Genemuiden and Zwartsluis lie 5 km further north, almost opposite one another, near the Zwarte Water. Aquatic sport tourism is important to the local economy.

== Population centres ==
The most important places are printed in bold type.

- Cellemuiden
- De Velde
- **Genemuiden** (population on 1 January 2007: 9,985)
- **Hasselt**, Overijssel, Netherlands (pop. 6,963)
- Kamperzeedijk-Oost
- Kamperzeedijk-West
- Kievitsnest
- Mastenbroek
- Zwartewatersklooster
- **Zwartsluis** (pop. 4,810).

Hasselt and Zwartsluis have small ports with some industry. Genemuiden is the biggest of the three towns, and is home to the majority of Zwartewaterland's population and industry.

== Sights ==
- A small part of the wetland area and National Park "De Wieden" (see Steenwijkerland) is immediately north of Zwartsluis
- The town hall was built between 1550 and 1615.
- Saint Stephen's Church a Gothic church built in 1466.
- Every year on the feast of Corpus Christi a Roman Catholic pilgrimage to Hasselt is held, with a procession. For that purpose a special church was built in 1933.

== Notable people ==
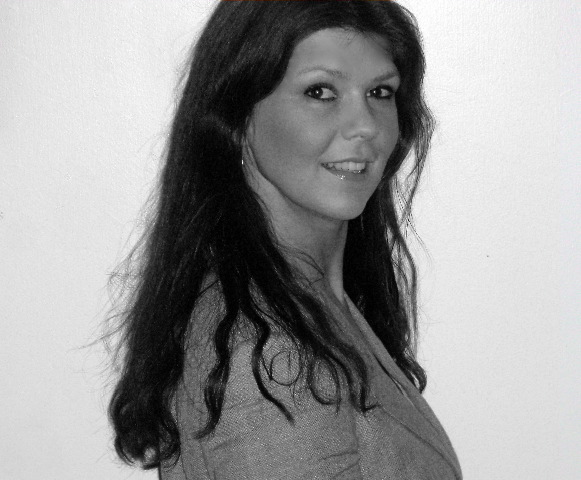
Afke Schaart, 2006

- Kiliaen van Rensselaer (1586 in Hasselt – ca.1643) diamond and pearl merchant, co-founder of the Dutch West India Company
- Jan de Koning (1926 in Zwartsluis – 1994) politician
- Jaap Drupsteen (born 1942 in Hasselt) graphic designer
- Eelco Gelling (born 1946 in Zwartsluis) blues guitarist
- Afke Schaart (born 1973 in Zwartsluis) former politician

=== Sport ===
- Gerard Nijboer (born 1955 in Hasselt) former long-distance runner, competed in three consecutive Summer Olympics
- Willeke Knol (born 1991 in Hasselt) racing cyclist
- Pascal Eenkhoorn (born 1997 in Genemuiden) cyclist

== Gallery ==
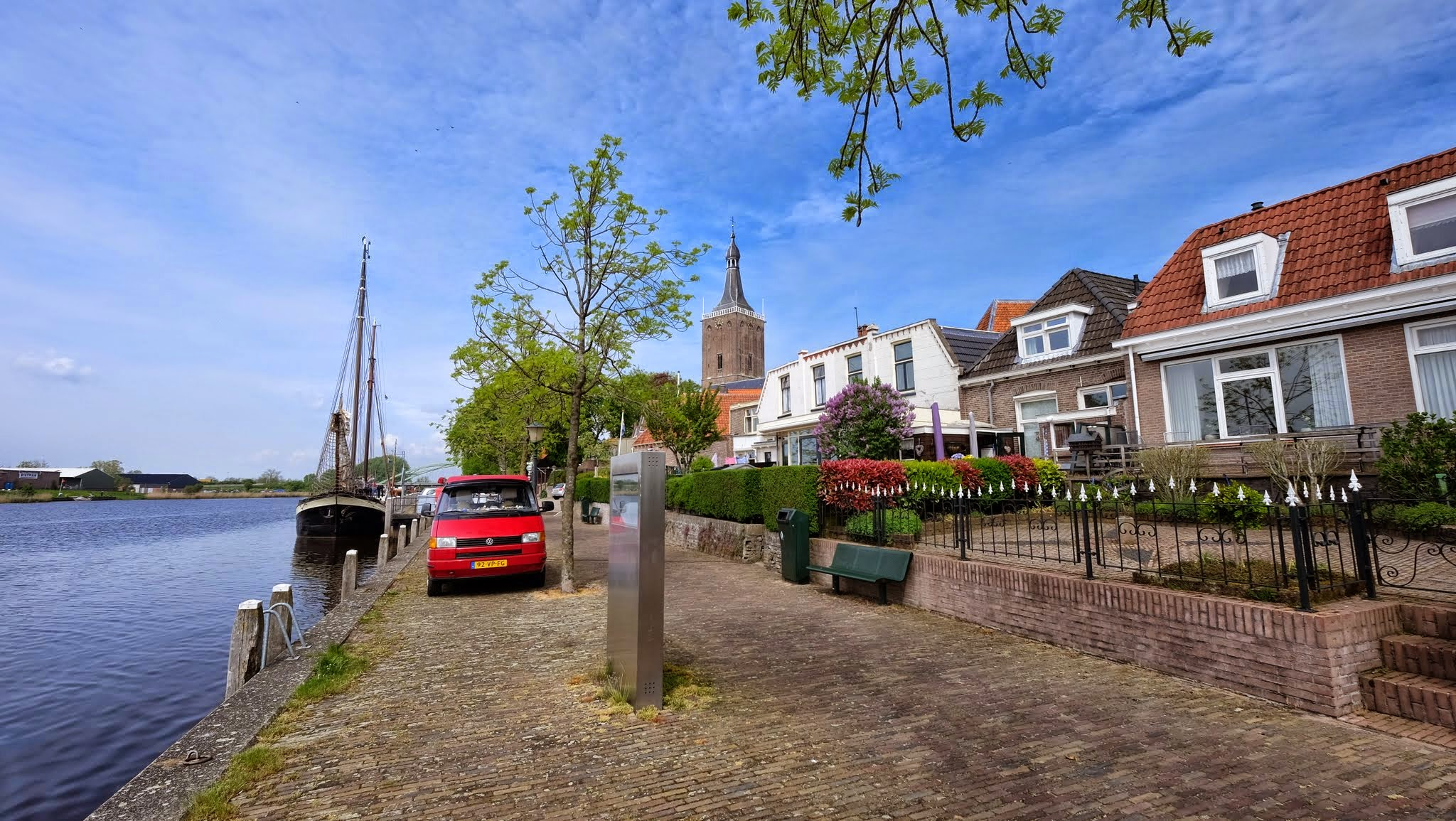
Hasselt

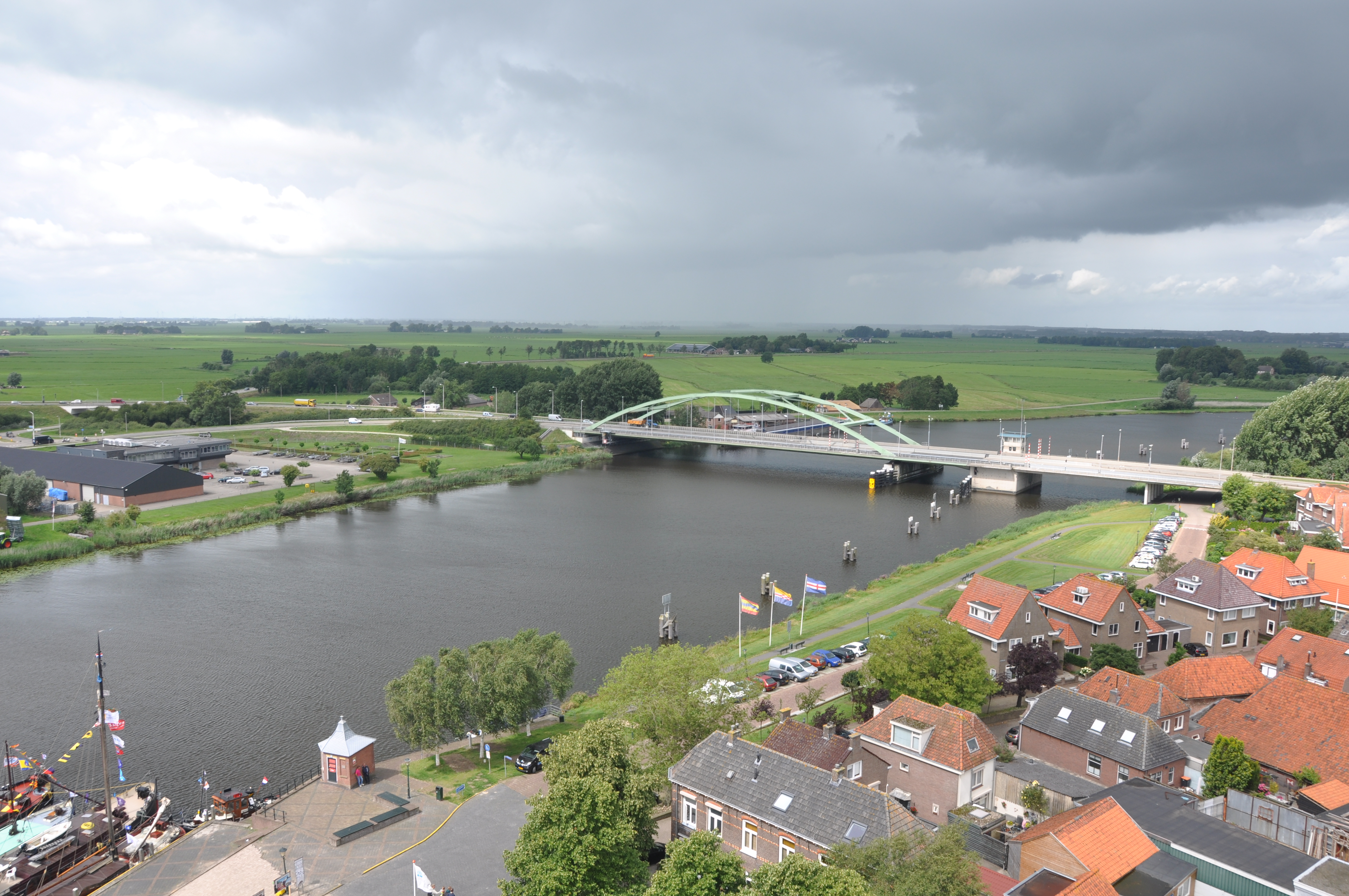
Overzicht van Hasselt vanaf de Sint Stephanuskerk

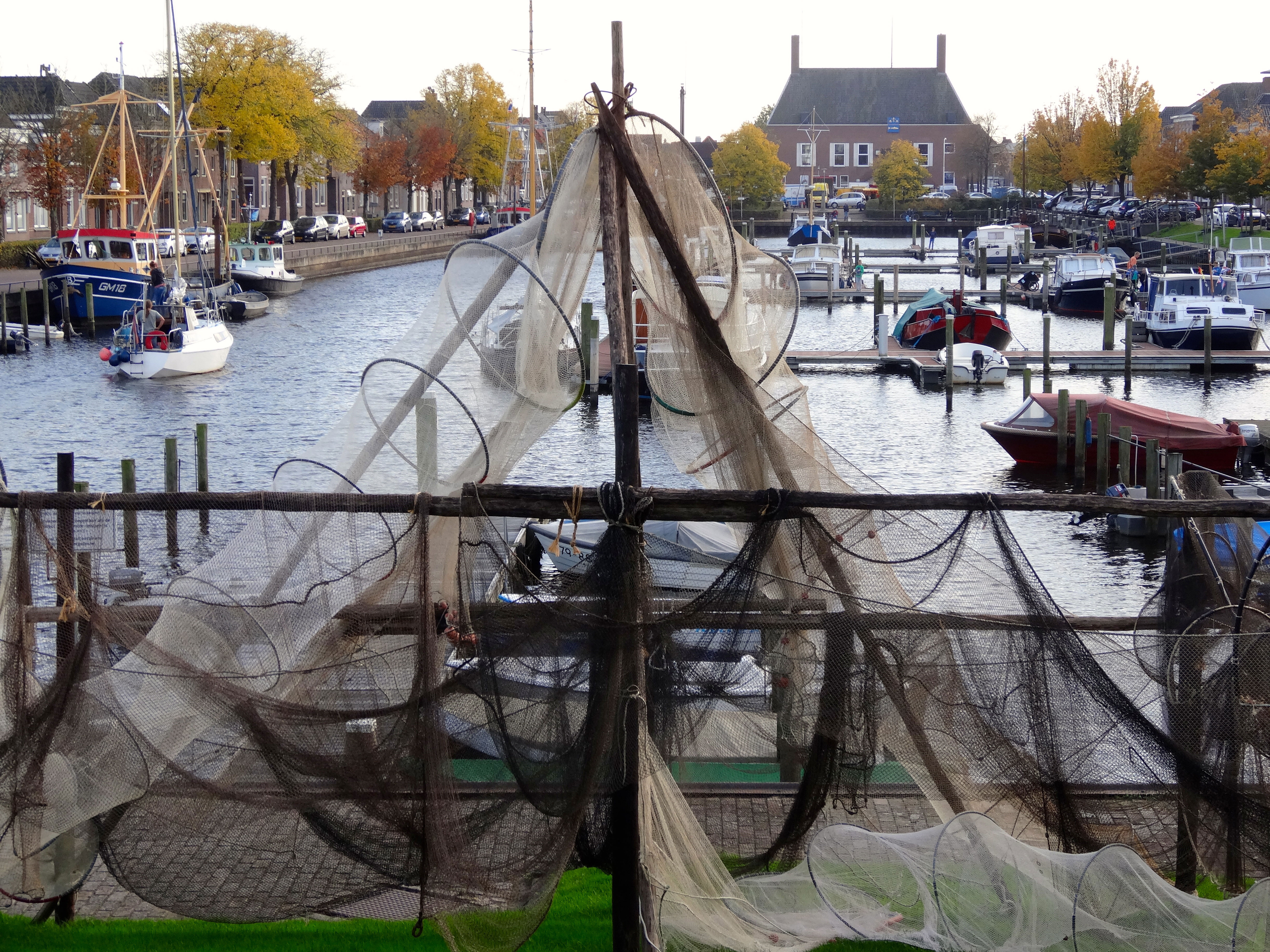
Binnenhaven, Genemuiden
