= List of windmills in Overijssel =

List of Dutch windmills

A list of windmills in the Dutch province of Overijssel.

Location	Name of mill	Type	Built	Notes	Photograph
Almelo	De Hoop	Stellingmolen	1910	Molendatabase (in Dutch)	
Ane	Anermolen	Beltmolen	1858	Molendatabase (in Dutch)	
Balkbrug	De Star	Stellingmolen	1882	Molendatabase (in Dutch)	
Brucht		Stellingmolen		Moved to Hollum, Friesland in 1991.	
Dalfsen	De Westermolen	Stellingmolen	1818	Molendatabase (in Dutch)	
Denekamp	Nieuwe Molen; Sint Nicolaasmolen	Grondzeiler	1859	Molendatabase (in Dutch)	
Denekamp	Borgelinkmolen	Stellingmolen	2001	Molendatabase (in Dutch)	
Deventer	Bolwerksmolen	Stellingmolen	1863	Molendatabase (in Dutch)	
Fleringen	Grobbemolen; Fleringer Molen	Grondzeiler	1846	Molendatabase (in Dutch)	
Geesteren	Grote Geesterense Molen	Beltmolen	1867	Molendatabase (in Dutch)	
Giethoorn	Molengat	Tjasker	1979	Molendatabase (in Dutch)	
Giethoorn	Noord	Tjasker	1970	Molendatabase (in Dutch)	
Giethoorn	Zuid	Tjasker	1988	Molendatabase (in Dutch)	
Goor	Braakmolen	Stellingmolen	1856	Molendatabase (in Dutch)	
Haaksbergen	De Korenbloem	Stellingmolen	1798	Molendatabase (in Dutch)	
Hankate	Molen van Kappert	Achtkantmolen	1892	Moved to Veenord, Drenthe in 1916. Molendatabase (in Dutch); De Hollandsche Molen (in Dutch)	
Hardenberg	De Oelemolle	Stellingmolen		Molendatabase (in Dutch)	
Hasselt	De Zwaluw	Stellingmolen	1784	Molendatabase (in Dutch)	
Hellendoorn	De Hoop	Stellingmolen	1854	Molendatabase (in Dutch)	
Hellendoorn	De Wippe; Molen van Fakkert	Stellingmolen	1821	Molendatabase (in Dutch)	
Jonen	Tjasker Jonen	Tjasker	2010	Molendatabase (in Dutch)	
Kalenberg	Tjasker Kalenberg	Tjasker	1963	Molendatabase (in Dutch)	
Kampen	De Olde Zwarver	Stellingmolen	1842	Molendatabase (in Dutch)	
Lattrop	Oortmanmolen	Stellingmolen	1910	Molendatabase (in Dutch)	
Lettele	De Leeuw	Stellingmolen	1856	Molendatabase (in Dutch)	
Lonneker	Lonnekermolen	Beltmolen	1851	Molendatabase (in Dutch)	
Markelo	De Hoop; Molen van Buursink	Stellingmolen	1836	Molendatabase (in Dutch)	
Marle	De Vlijt	Stellingmolen	1887	Molendatabase (in Dutch)	
Olst	Bökkers Mölle	Stellingmolen	1866	Molendatabase (in Dutch)	
Ommen	De Besthmenermolen	Beltmolen	1862	Molendatabase (in Dutch)	
Ommen	De Konijnenbelt	Stellingmolen	1806	Molendatabase (in Dutch)	
Ommen	De Lelie	Stellingmolen	1846	Molendatabase (in Dutch)	
Ommen	Den Oordt	Stellingmolen	1824	Molendatabase (in Dutch)	
Ootmarsum	Molen Van Oude Hengel	Stellingmolen	1872	Molendatabase (in Dutch)	
Ossenzijl	De Wicher	Spinnenkop	1982	Molendatabase (in Dutch)	
Ossenzijl	Tjasker Ossenzijl	Tjasker	1977	Molendatabase (in Dutch)	
Overesch		Iron windpump	1920	Molendatabase (in Dutch)	
Paasloo		Tonmolen	1899	Molendatabase (in Dutch)	
Radewijk	Windlust	Beltmolen	1876	Molendatabase (in Dutch)	
Reutum	De Vier Winden; Weerselose Molen	Stellingmolen	1862	Molendatabase (in Dutch)	
Rijssen-Holten (Rijssen)	Pelmolen Ter Horst	Stellingmolen	1752	Molendatabase (in Dutch)	
Rijssen-Holten (Dijkerhoek)	De Hegeman	Stellingmolen	1890	Molendatabase (in Dutch)	
Saasveld	Saoseler Meul	Grondzeiler	1870	Molendatabase (in Dutch)	
Sint Jansklooster	De Foeke	Tjasker	1968	Molendatabase (in Dutch)	
Sint Jansklooster	Monnikenmolen	Stellingmolen	1857	Molendatabase (in Dutch)	
Slagharen	De Pionier	Stellingmolen	1859	Molendatabase (in Dutch)	
Staphorst		Achtkantmolen	1764	Moved to De Wijk, Drenthe in 1829. Molendatabase (in Dutch); De Hollandsche Molen (in Dutch)	
Staphorst	De Leijen	Grondzeiler	1854	Molendatabase (in Dutch)	
Tilligte	De Westerveld Möl	Beltmolen	1983	Molendatabase (in Dutch)	
Usselo	Wissink's Meul	Standerdmolen	1802	Molendatabase (in Dutch)	
Vilsteren	De Vilsterse Molen	Stellingmolen	1901	Molendatabase (in Dutch)	
Vriezenveen	Leemansmolen	Stellingmolen	1862	Molendatabase (in Dutch)	
Welsum, Olst-Wijhe	Houdt Braef Stant	Stellingmolen	1856	Molendatabase (in Dutch)	
Wijhe	De Wijhese Molen	Stellingmolen	1703	Molendatabase (in Dutch)	
Windesheim	Windesheimer Molen	Stellingmolen	1748	Molendatabase (in Dutch)	
Zalk	De Valk	Stellingmolen	1860	Molendatabase (in Dutch)	
Zwolle	De Passiebloem	Stellingmolen	1776	Molendatabase (in Dutch)	
