= Tjaskers in Overijssel =

Type of windmill, used for drainage

A Tjasker is a type of small drainage windmill used in the Netherlands and north Germany. There are seven tjaskers remaining in Overijssel, all located in the marshy region in the northwest corner of the province.

== Locations ==
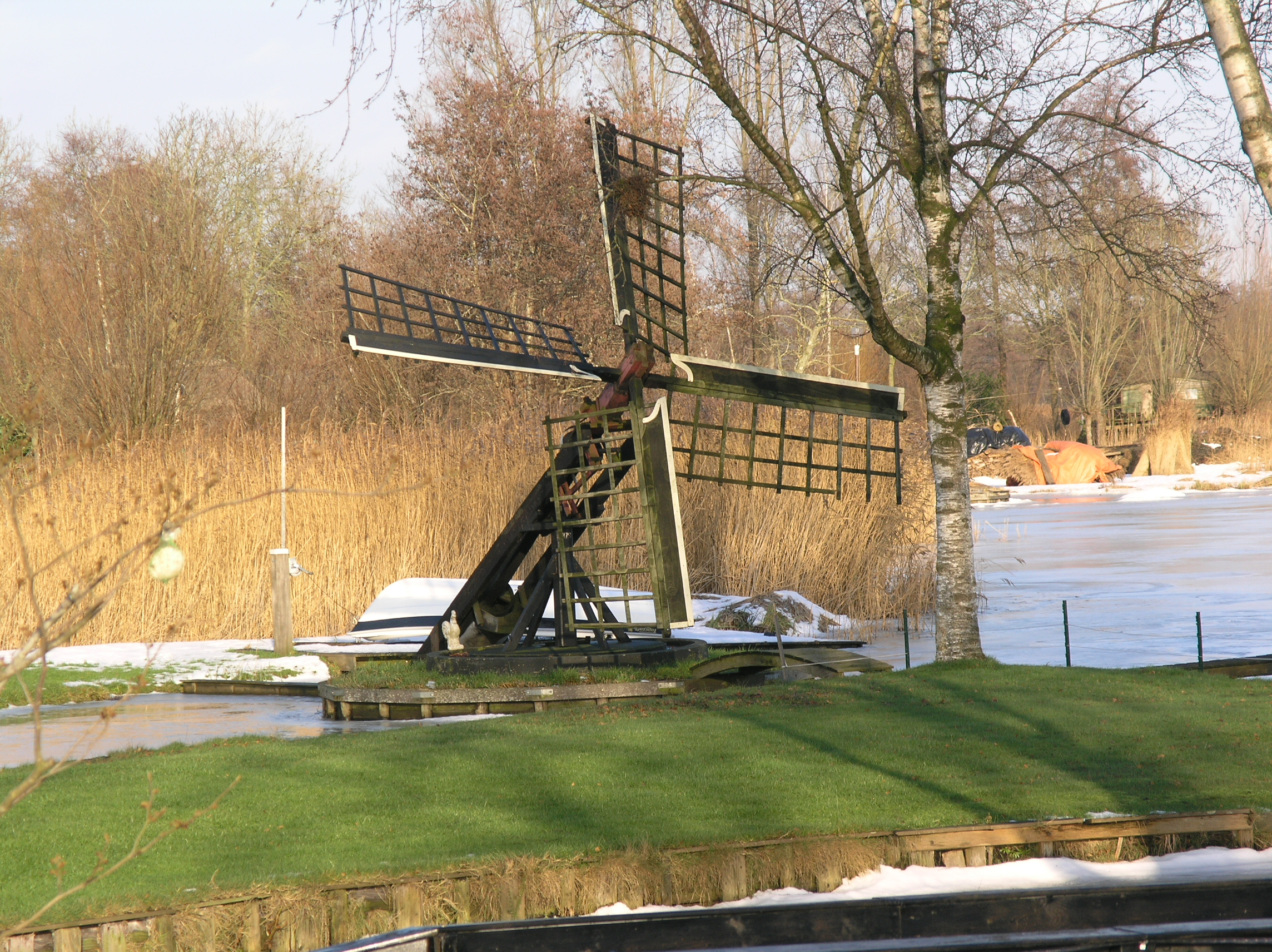
Tjasker Molengat Giethoorn, December 2009

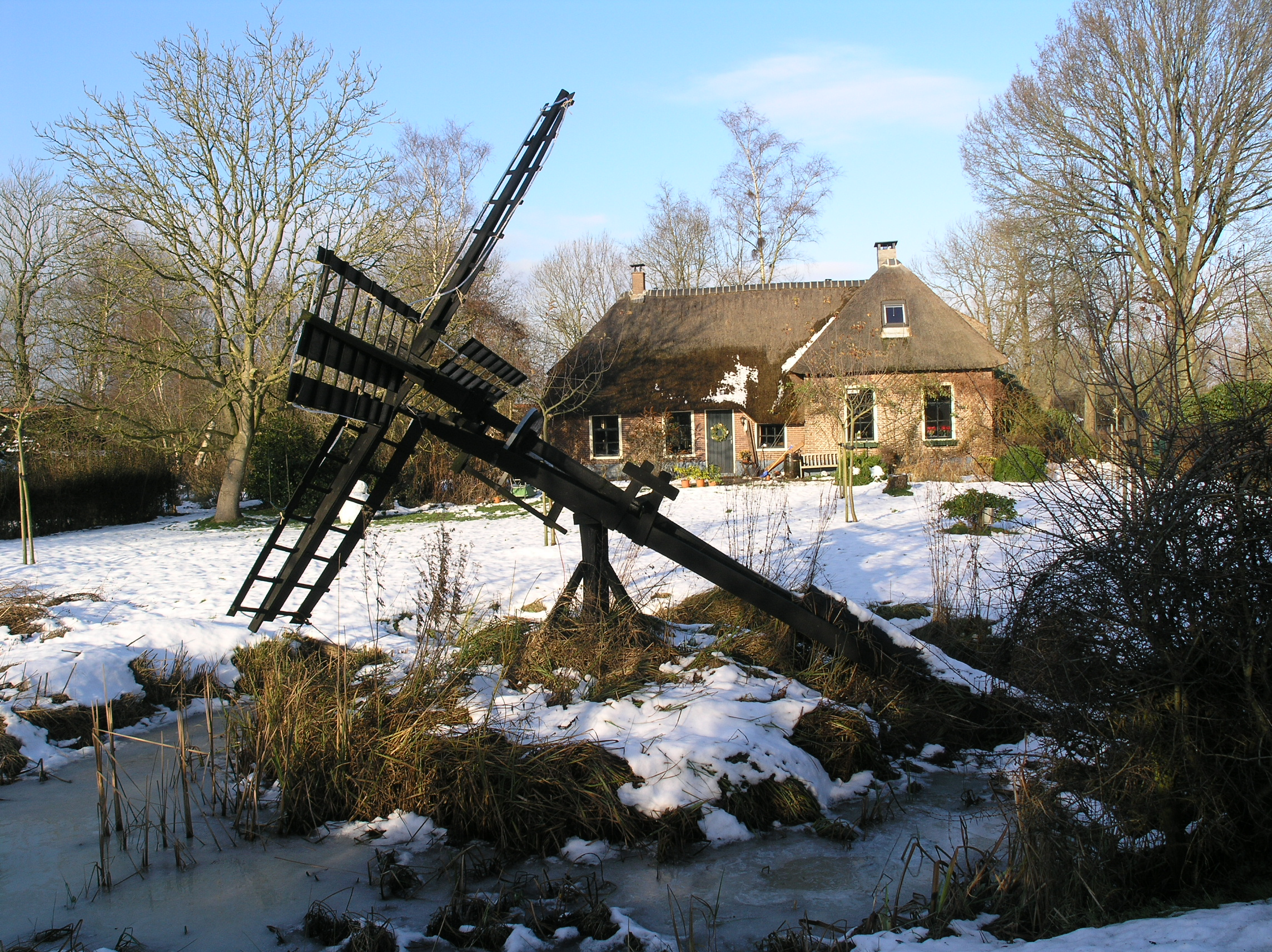
Tjasker Noord Giethoorn, December 2009

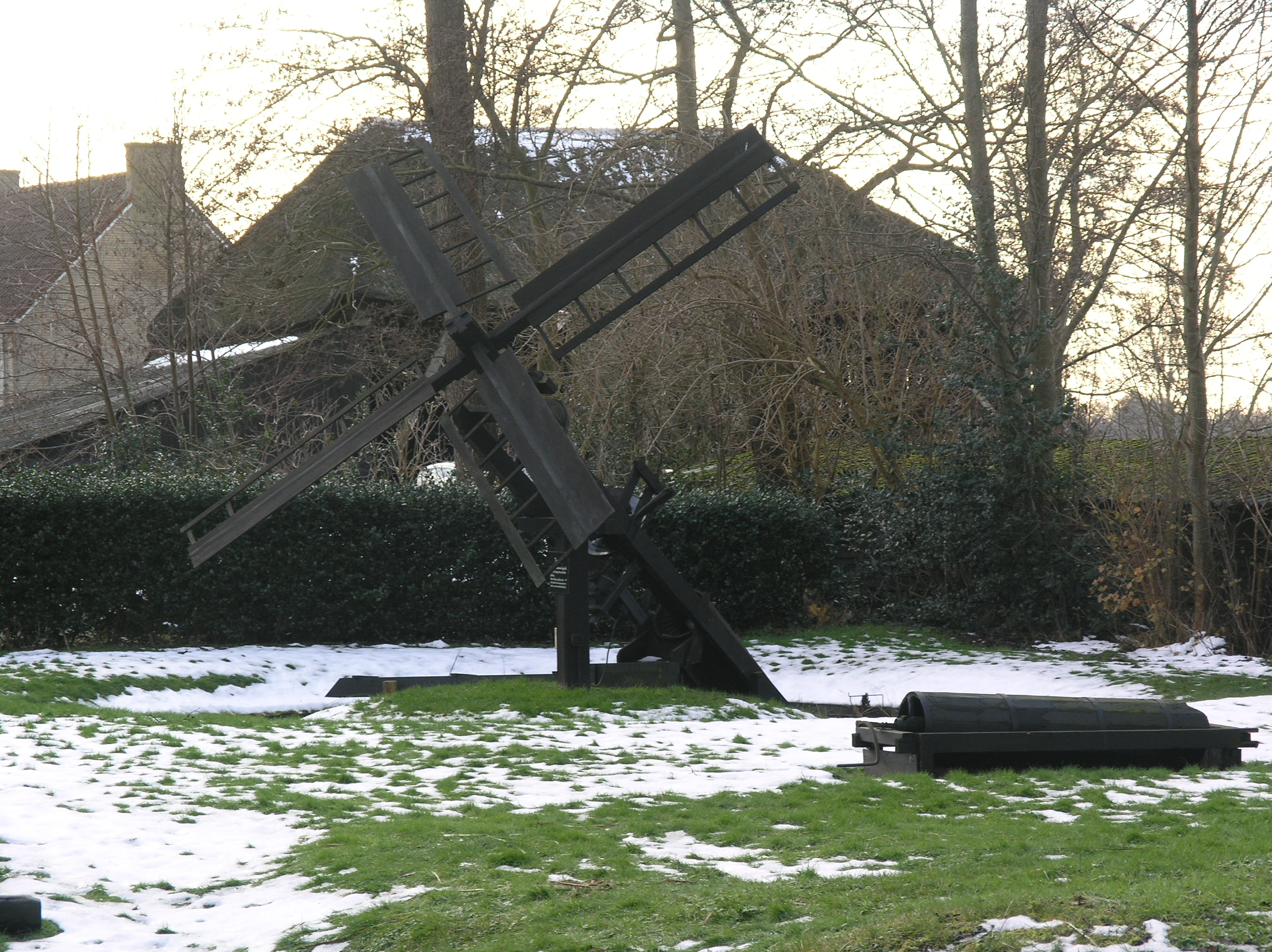
Tjasker Zuid Giethoorn, December 2009

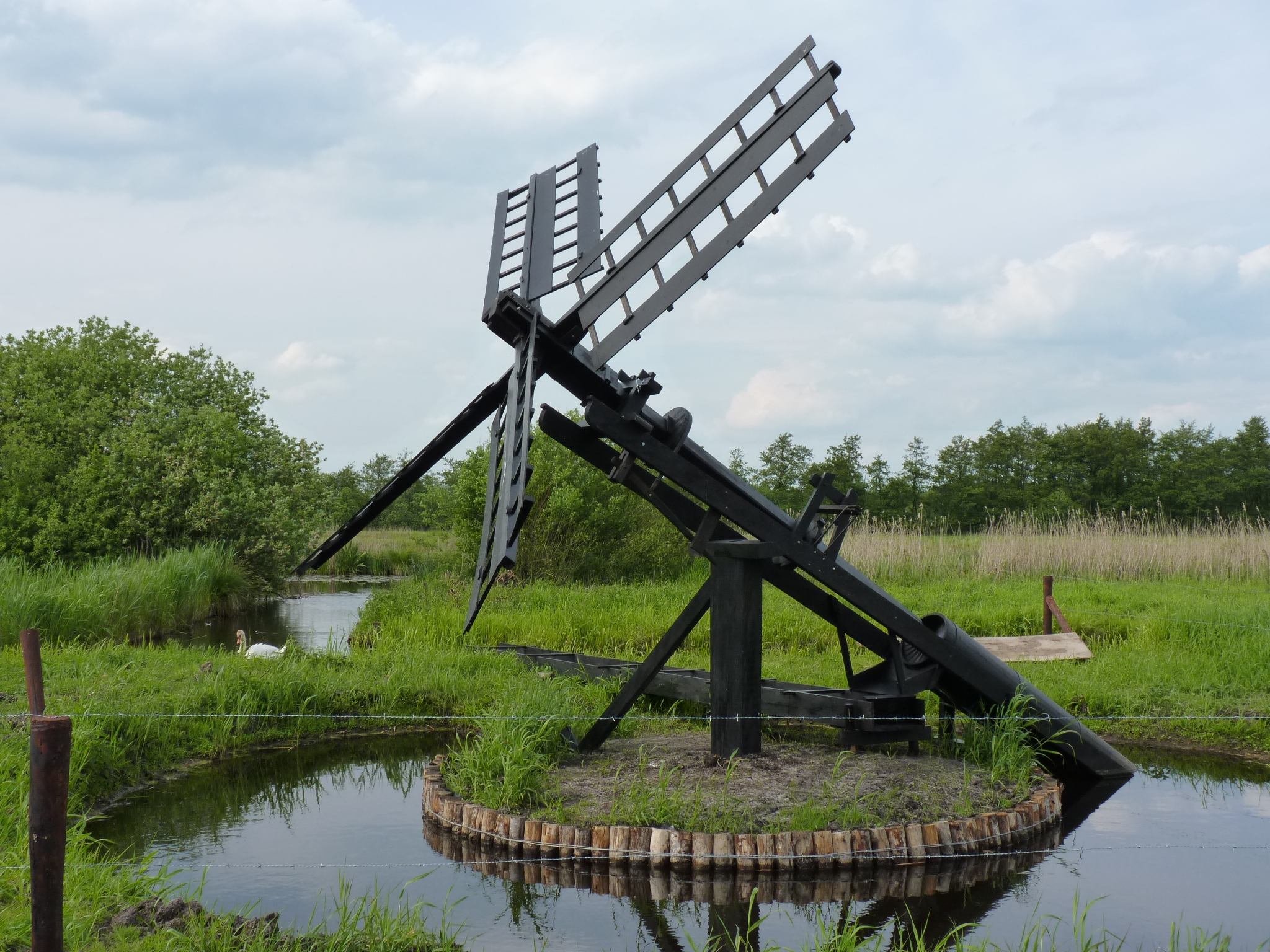
Tjasker Jonen, May 2010

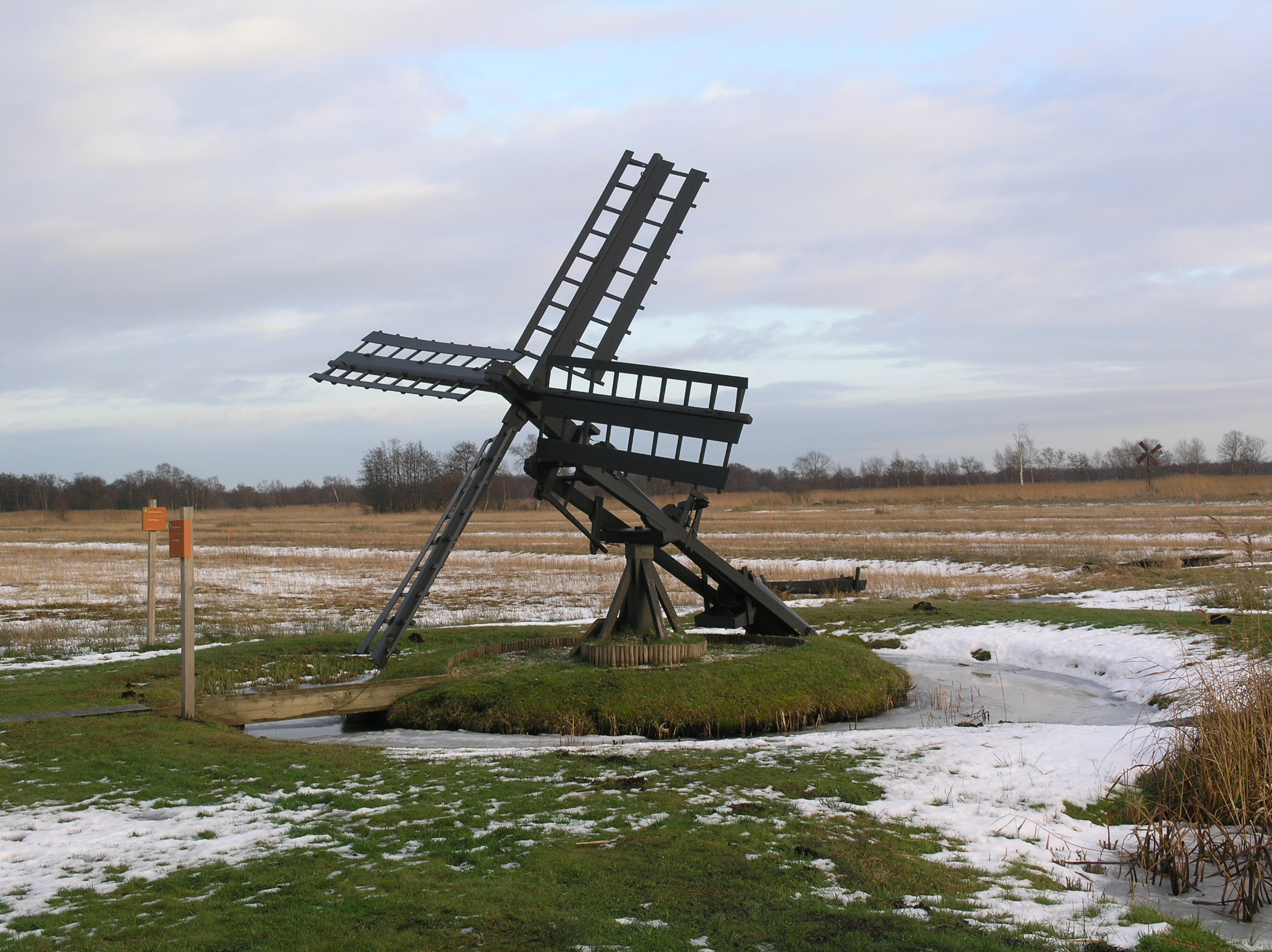
Tjasker Kalenberg, December 2009

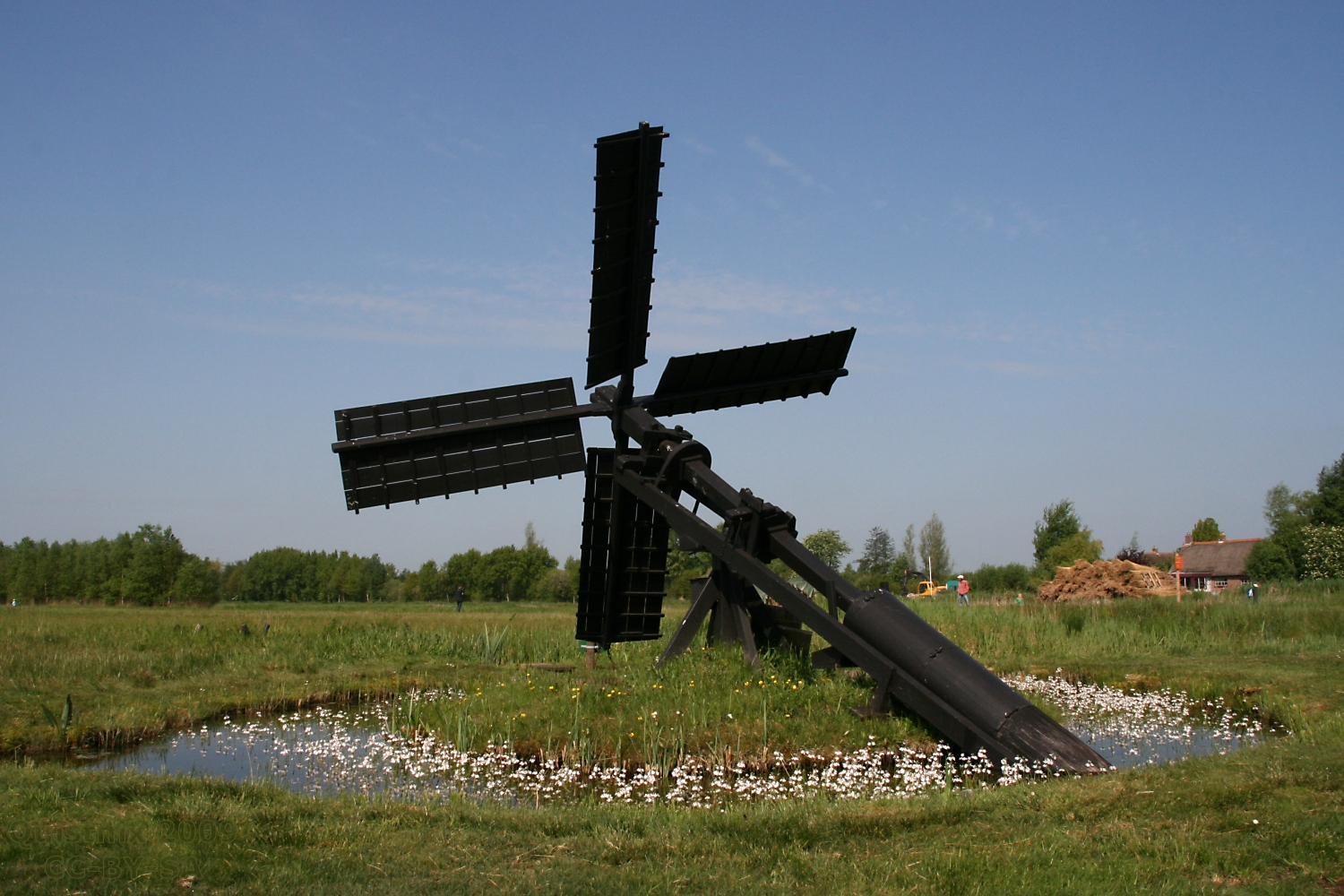
Tjasker Ossenzijl, May 2009

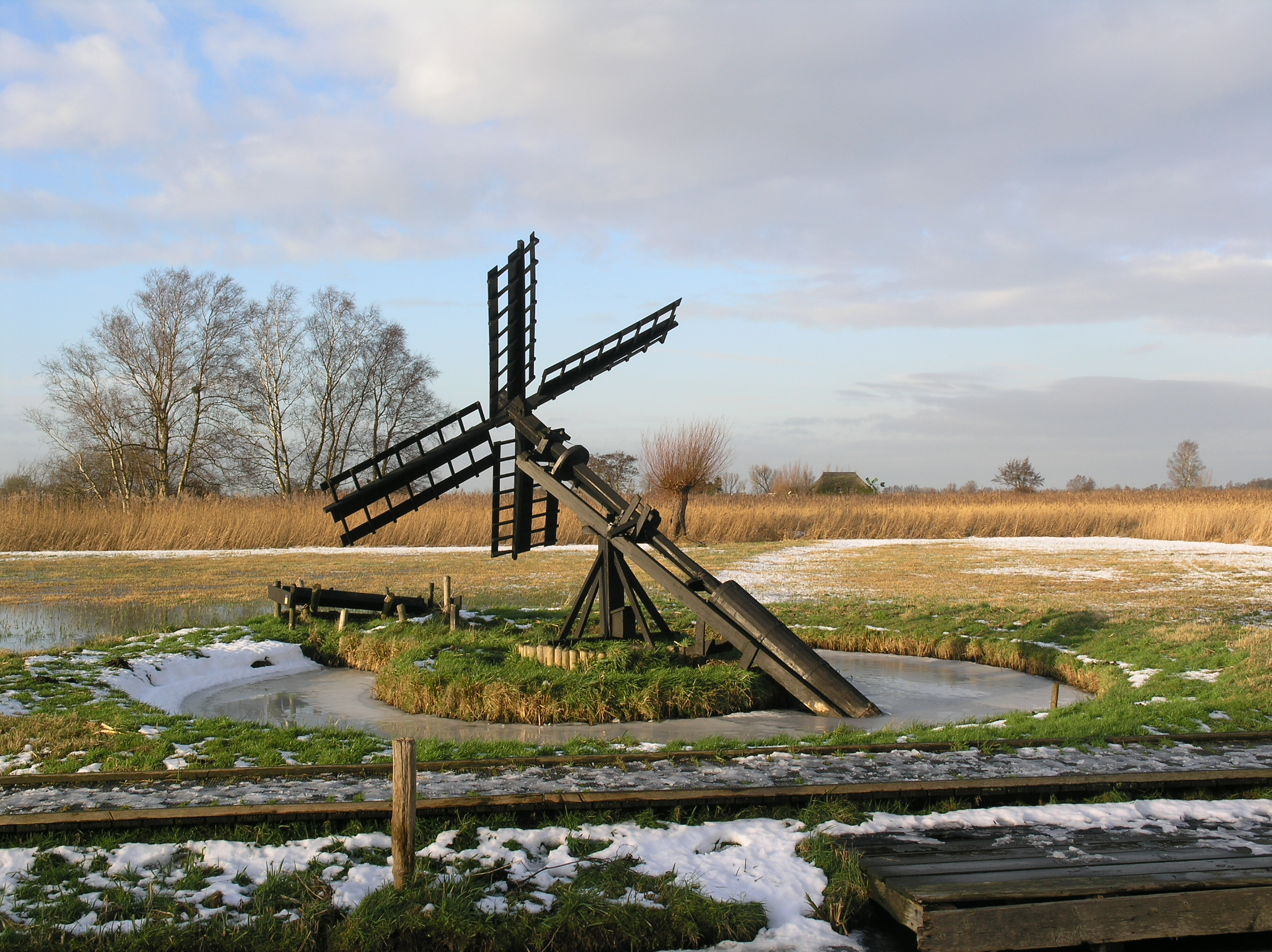
Tjasker De Foeke, December 2009

=== Giethoorn ===
Molengat

52.741814°N 6.084491°E
The paaltjasker was built in 1979 (47 years ago) in Giethoorn and is in private ownership. Its operational but has no real function. The tjasker has four Common sails, which have a span of 5.40 metres (17 ft 9 in).

Noord

52.742984°N 6.084095°E
The paaltjasker was built in 1970 (56 years ago) by well known tjasker builder Roelof Dijksma to drain his and his neighbours garden. The tjasker has four symmetrical Common sails that can be covered with wooden slats and which have a span of 5.1 metres (16 ft 9 in).

Zuid

52.722061°N 6.088854°E
The paaltjasker was built in 1988 (38 years ago) and is part of museum 't Olde Maat Uus showing life in Giethoorn about a century ago. The tjasker is operational but because of its sheltered location it is powered by an electric motor. It can be visited during opening hours of the museum. The tjasker has four Common sails that can be covered with wooden slats and which have a span of 5.0 metres (16 ft 5 in).

=== Jonen ===
52.719481°N 6.021737°E
The paaltjasker was built in 2010 (16 years ago) on the initiative of Stichting Natuurlijk Jonen which works on the protection of the cultural and natural landscape around hamlet Jonen. The tjasker has four symmetrical Common sails that can be covered with wooden slats.

=== Ossenzijl/Kalenberg ===
Nameless tjasker on Hoogeweg

52.783892°N 5.981597°E
The paaltjasker was built in 1963 (63 years ago) by well known tjasker builder Roelof Dijksma. It was donated to Staatsbosbeheer by monthly Overijssel magazine De Mars to celebrate its 10th anniversary and was the start of a small renaissance for tjaskers in general. The tjasker has four symmetrical Common sails that can be covered with wooden slats and is used to pump water into the quaking bog.

Nameless tjasker on Hoogeweg near De Weerribben visitor centre

52.808513°N 5.937158°E
The paaltjasker was built in 1977 (49 years ago) by Jac. Punter of Paaslo as a copy of the above-mentioned tjasker built by Dijksma. It was repaired and moved about 200 m in 1984. The tjasker is close to the Staatsbosbeheer visitor centre of nature reserve De Weerribben near Ossenzijl and is used to pump water into the reed beds in summer. The tjasker has four symmetrical Common sails that can be covered with wooden slats and which have a span of 5.55 metres (18 ft 3 in).

=== Sint Jansklooster ===
De Foeke

52.668342°N 6.015439°E
The paaltjasker was built in 1968 (58 years ago) by well known tjasker builder Roelof Dijksma for nature conservation organisation Natuurmonumenten near their then newly built visitor centre De Foeke in nature reserve De Wieden near Sint Jansklooster. The tjasker has four symmetrical Common sails that can be covered with wooden slats and which have a span of 5.15 metres (16 ft 11 in).

== Dutch Wikipedia articles ==
- Molengat (tjasker)
- Noord (tjasker)
- Zuid (tjasker)
- Tjasker Jonen
- Tjasker Kalenberg
- Tjasker Ossenzijl
- De Foeke
