= Witcher =

Witcher may refer to:

- Witcher (surname)
- Witcher Creek, a tributary of the Kanawha River in West Virginia, United States
- Dowser, or water witcher, a diviner who attempts to locate underground objects
- Witcher, an English translation of the word vedmak, a male witch in Slavic mythology
- Witcher, a fictional occupation in Andrzej Sapkowski's novel series The Witcher

== See also ==
- The Witcher (disambiguation)
- Wicher (disambiguation)
