= Wich =

Wich may refer to:

- -wich town, a settlement in Anglo-Saxon England characterised by extensive artisanal activity and trade
- WICH (1310 AM, "Personality Radio"), radio station licensed to serve Norwich, Connecticut
- DJ Wich (born 1978), Czech deejay, record producer and audio engineer
- Günther Wich (born 1928), German conductor
- Jessica Wich (born 1990), German football striker
- Wich., taxonomic author abbreviation for Max Ernst Wichura (1817–1866), German lawyer and botanist

== See also ==
- Wich Stand, '50s-style coffee shop restaurant and diner in Los Angeles, California
- Which Wich?, an American fast casual restaurant chain specializing in sandwiches and salads
- Wich Bridge, alternative title for Nantwich Bridge in Nantwich, Cheshire, England
- Which (disambiguation)
- Witch (disambiguation)
