= Wichers =

Wichers is a surname. Notable people with the surname include:

- Edward Wichers (1892–1984), American chemist
- Jan Wichers (1745–1808), Dutch military officer and Governor of Suriname
- Peter Wichers (born 1979), Swedish musician and producer

== See also ==
- Wicher (disambiguation)
- Withers (surname)
