= De Wicher =

Windmill in Kalenberg, Netherlands

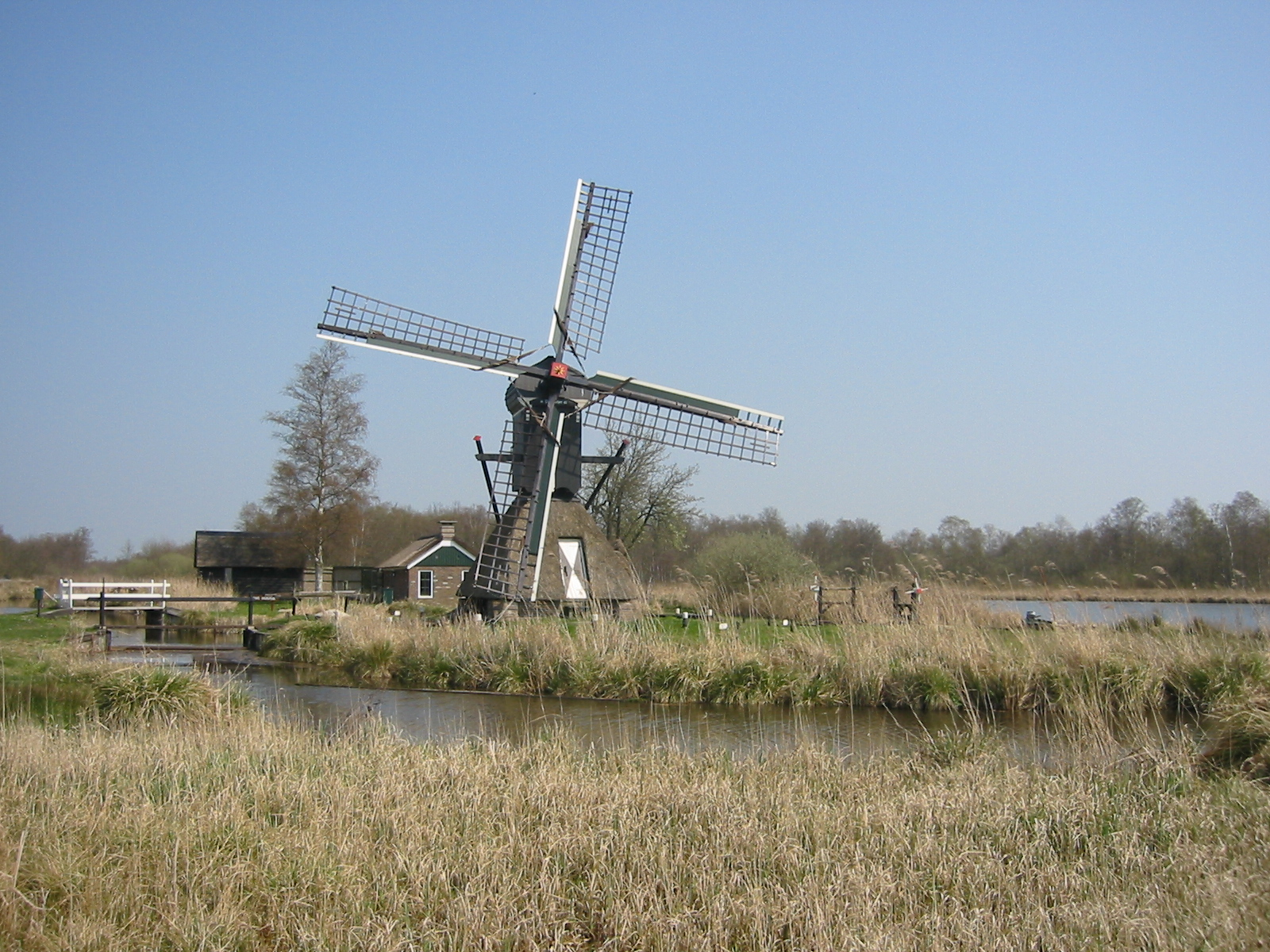
- Spinnenkop De Wicher
- Interactive map of De Wicher

Origin
- Mill name: Spinnenkop Wedderveer
- Mill location: Hoogeweg, Kalenberg
- Coordinates: 52.785509°N 5.97809°E
- Operator: Staatsbosbeheer
- Year built: 1982; 44 years ago

Information
- Purpose: Drainage mill
- Type: Hollow post
- Roundhouse storeys: Single storey roundhouse
- No. of sails: Four sails
- Type of sails: Patent sails
- Windshaft: Cast iron
- Winding: Tailpole and winch
- Type of pump: Archimedes' screw

De Wicher is a drainage mill near the village of Kalenberg, Overijssel, Netherlands. It is a hollow post windmill of the type called spinnenkop by the Dutch. The mill is in working order and used to drain the reed beds during winter to improve accessibility for reed cutters.

== History ==
The predecessor of the current mill was the last windmill in the current De Weerribben-Wieden National Park. It was dismantled in 1942. By 1980 a foundation called Vrienden van de Weerribben got the idea of rebuilding this mill. The idea was taken up by Staatsbosbeheer (English: State Forest Management) and by 1982 the construction of the new mill was finished.

== Description ==
De Wicher is what the Dutch describe as a spinnenkop (English: spiderhead mill). It is a small hollow post mill winded by a winch. The mill has common sails. The wooden stocks has a span of 13 metres (42 ft 8 in) and 12.65 metres (41 ft 6 in). The stocks and brake wheel are carried on the windshaft and drive the wallower at the top of the upright shaft in the body (called head on a spinnenkop), which passed through the main post into the substructure. At the bottom of the upright shaft is the crown wheel which drives the wooden Archimedes' screw. The body (called head on a spinnenkop) is weatherboarded while the substructure is thatched and rests on a brick base.

== Public access ==
The mill is open to the public on Wednesday afternoons during the summer season and on appointment.
