= Witcher (surname) =

The surname Witcher may refer to:

- Al Witcher (born 1936), American football player
- Bobby Witcher, American herpetologist
- Dick Witcher former professional American football player
- Gabe Witcher (born 1978), American multi-instrumentalist, producer, and arranger best known as a fiddle player and singer, He is a founding member of the string ensemble Punch Brothers
- John Seashoal Witcher (1839–1906), American Union brevet brigadier general
- Robert C. Witcher, sixth bishop of the Episcopal Diocese of Long Island
- Ronald K. Witcher, owner of KCYL, a Texas radio station
- Vincent A. Witcher, namesake of Witcher's Battalion, American Civil War
- Witcher (Hampshire cricketer), English cricketer who played a single game for Hampshire county cricket teams; no bio info available

== See also ==
- Wicher (disambiguation) for some other spelling variants
