= Whicher =

Whicher may refer to:

- Jack Whicher (1814–1881), one of the original members of the Detective Branch at Scotland Yard
  - The protagonist of the British TV series The Suspicions of Mr Whicher, based on the police officer
- Ross Whicher (1918–2002), Canadian politician
- Whicher Range, Western Australia
  - Whicher National Park

== See also ==
- Wicher (disambiguation)
- Which (disambiguation)
