= Wicher =

Wicher may refer to:

== People ==
- Enos Regnet Wicher
- Maria Wicher
- Wicher Berkhoff, Dutch name of Vasily Berkov (1794–1870)

== Vehicles ==
- Wicher-class destroyer
- ORP Wicher
  - ORP Wicher (1928)
  - ORP Wicher (1958)
- PZL.44 Wicher

== Other uses ==
- De Wicher, Kalenberg, Netherlands

== See also ==
- Witcher (disambiguation)
- Whicher (disambiguation)
- Whitcher (surname)
