= The Witcher (disambiguation) =

The Witcher is a fantasy series of short stories and novels by Polish writer Andrzej Sapkowski.

The Witcher may also refer to other works based on the stories by Andrzej Sapkowski:

- The Witcher (video game series), an action role-playing game series beginning in 2007
  - The Witcher (video game), 2007
  - The Witcher 2: Assassins of Kings, 2011
  - The Witcher 3: Wild Hunt, 2015
- The Witcher (TV series), a 2019 American fantasy television series
- The Witcher, alternative English title of the Polish film, The Hexer, 2001
- The Witcher, alternative English title of the Polish television series, The Hexer, 2002
- "The Witcher", a 1986 short story later included in the short story collection The Last Wish, 1993
- The Witcher (Prószyński i S-ka), 1993–1995, a comic book series, written by Maciej Parowski and illustrated by Bogusław Polch
- The Witcher (Dark Horse Comics), 2014–present

== See also ==
- The Witcher of Grand Kiev, a cyberpunk-fantasy parody of Andrzej Sapkowski's the Witcher, written by a Russian author Vladimir Vasilyev
- Witcher (disambiguation)
