= Whitcher =

Whitcher is a surname. Notable people with the surname include:

- Bob Whitcher (1917–1997), American baseball pitcher
- Chase R. Whitcher (1876–1940), American architect
- Frances Miriam Whitcher (1811–1852), American humorist
- Mary Whitcher (c. 19th century), American Shaker born in Laurens (town), New York
- Sarah Whitcher (b. 1779/80), missing person known for List of New Hampshire historical markers (251–275)
- W.F. Whitcher, a notorious 19th century obsessed bibliomaniac
- William Whitcher (1832–1910), English cricketer
