= Which =

Which may refer to:

- which, an English word which functions as a relative pronoun and an interrogative word
- which (command), an operating system command
- Which?, a UK charity and its magazine

== See also ==
- English relative clauses
- Interrogative clause
- Whicher (disambiguation)
