= De Hegeman =

Smock mill in Overijssel, Netherlands

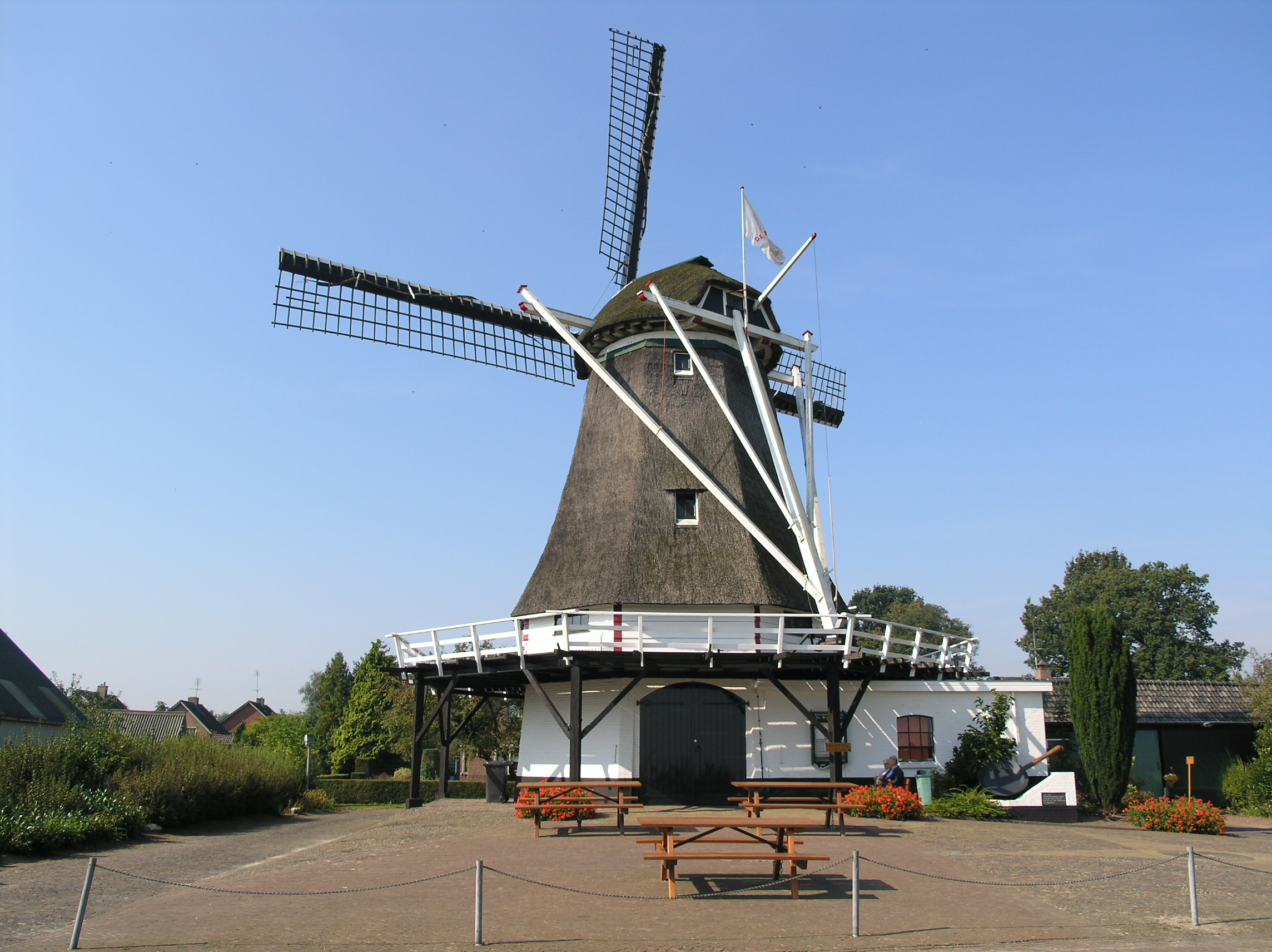
- Interactive map of De Hegeman

Origin
- Mill location: Dijkerhoek, Rijssen-Holten, Overijssel, Netherlands
- Coordinates: 52°16′47″N 6°21′04″E
- Year built: 1890; 136 years ago

Information
- Purpose: Gristmill,
- Type: Smock mill
- Smock sides: Eight sides
- No. of sails: Four sails
- Type of sails: Patent sails
- No. of pairs of millstones: two pairs
- Other information: Rijksmonument number 22218

De Hegeman is a smock mill operating as a gristmill in the community of Dijkerhoek in the municipality of Rijssen-Holten, Overijssel, in the eastern Netherlands. The mill was built in 1890 using an eight-sided top structure salvaged from a demolished mill in South Holland. It is a rijksmonument (Dutch National heritage site).

The construction was commissioned by the widow Klein Baltink-Willemsen, living at the home of Erve Hegeman, after whom the mill was named in 1983. The decline in the use of wind power after World War II lead to a sharp deterioration of the state of the mill. The sail cross was removed for safety reasons, and it was only in 1965 that the mill was restored with the support of the then municipality of Holten. Decline struck again, however, after the mill was transferred from a cooperative to a private individual. In 1978 the municipality of Holten decided to purchase the mill and a second restoration followed in 1981–1982.

The mill is now equipped with two pairs of millstones: one pair uses wind power; the other one is powered by a Deutz engine. The arms are 22.40 metres (73 ft 6 in) long and are equipped with the Old Dutch fencing with sails.

The mill is operated by volunteers and is used regularly to grind grain; one can purchase items produced in the mill on-site.
