= Weerribben-Wieden National Park =

National park in the Netherlands

- Nationaal Park Weerribben-Wieden
- IUCN category II (national park)
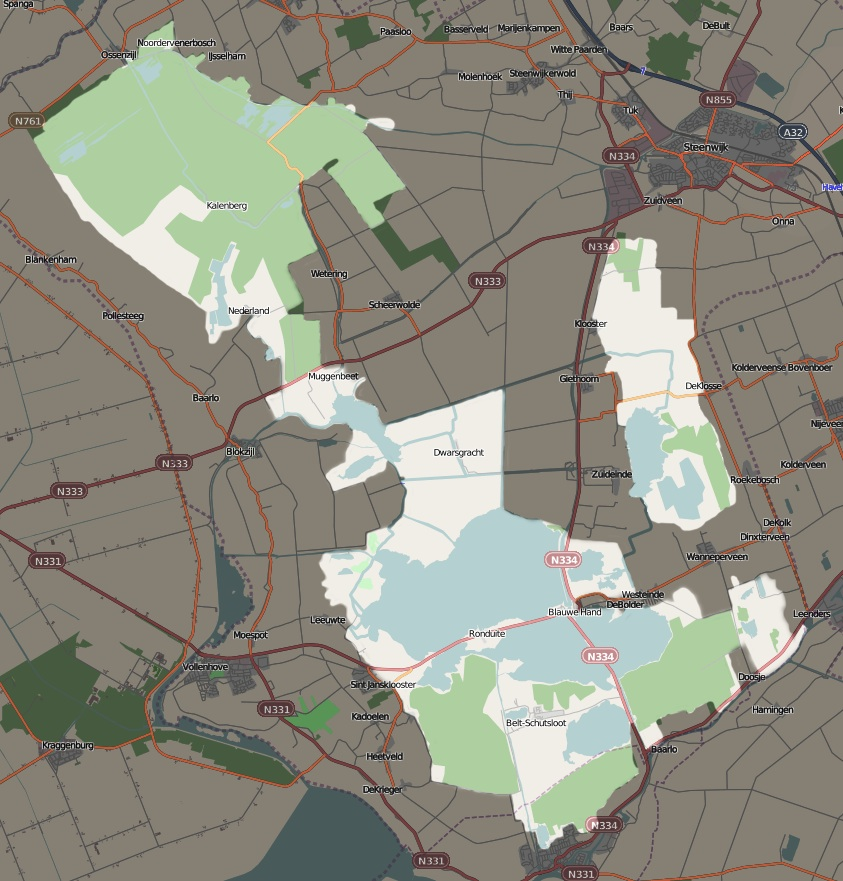
- Interactive map of Weerribben-Wieden National Park
- Location: Overijssel, Netherlands
- Coordinates: 52.73°N 6.03°E
- Area: 105 km^{2} (41 sq mi)(40.5 sq mi)
- Established: 1992
- Operator: Natuurmonumenten and Staatsbosbeheer

Ramsar Wetland
- Official name: Wieden
- Designated: 29 August 2000
- Reference no.: 1241

Weerribben-Wieden National Park (Dutch: Nationaal Park Weerribben-Wieden) is a Dutch national park in the Steenwijkerland and Zwartewaterland municipalities in the Overijssel province. Comprising the largest bog of Northwestern Europe, the park consists of two areas, De Weerribben and De Wieden; it has an area of roughly 100 square kilometres (39 sq mi). The park was founded in 1992, although De Wieden was added later, in 2009.

== History and former use ==
Large parts of the area were used for peat production until the Second World War. Since then a part of the area has been used for thatching reed production.

== Present management ==
The area is managed by the large private nature-conservation organisation Natuurmonumenten and by the Staatsbosbeheer (State Forest Service). Other parties are involved in management issues as well, such as local communities. About 1,000 hectares (2,500 acres) is still used for thatching reed production. Villages like the picturesque Giethoorn and monumental towns like Blokzijl and Vollenhove are important for tourism and recreation.

== Vegetation and wildlife ==
The vegetation and wildlife are typical for such an area, full of peat and water. Resident species include the water soldier, the sundew, the black tern, the northern pike and, recently, the otter. In addition, the Green Hawker and the Large Copper are found here.

== Visitor centres ==
- Visitor centre De Weerribben in Ossenzijl
- Information centre of the national park in Kalenberg
- Visitor centre De Wieden in Sint Jansklooster
- Schoonewelle 'Centrum Natuur en Ambacht' in Zwartsluis

== Pictures ==
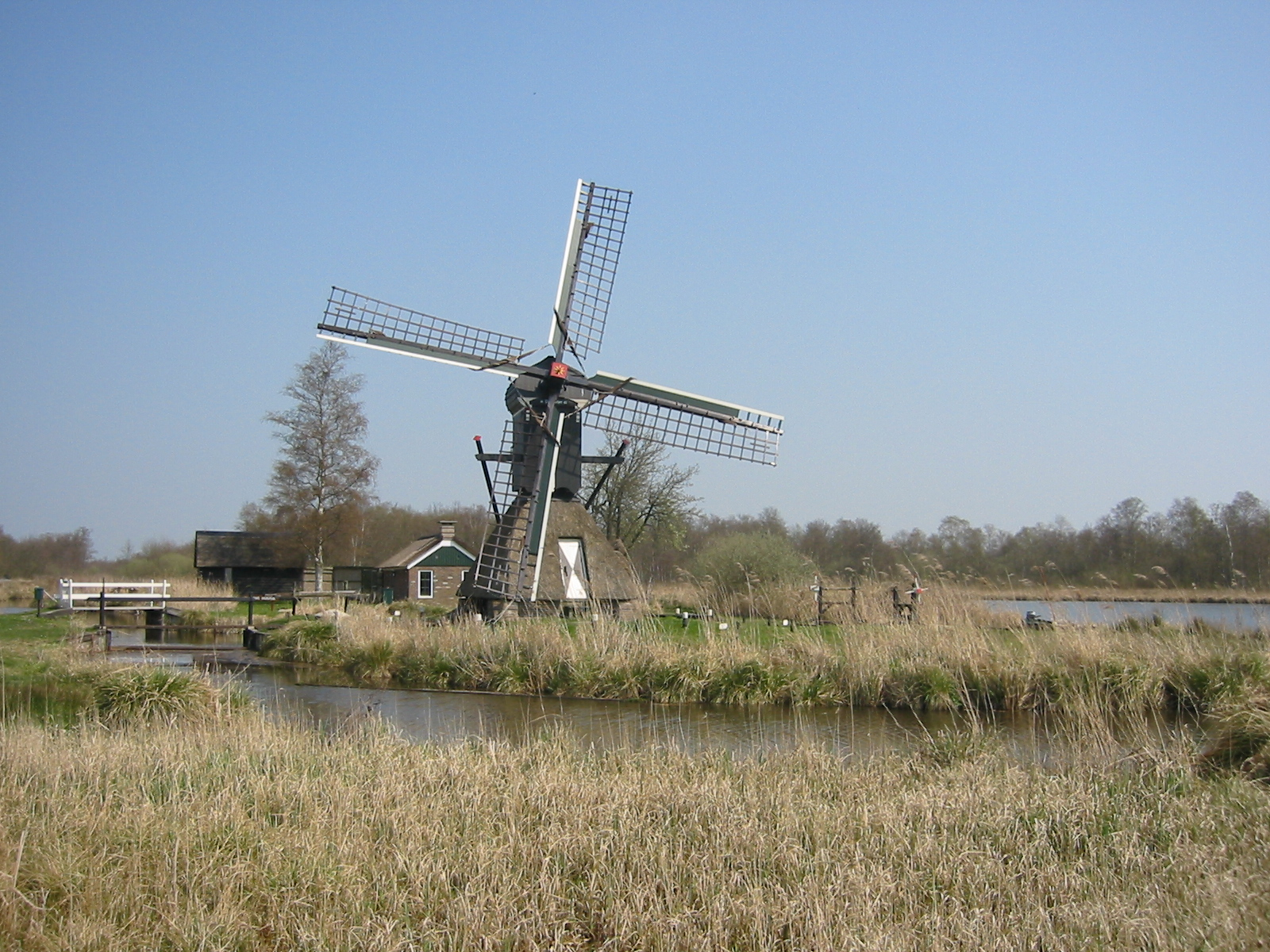
Weerribben-Wieden National Park

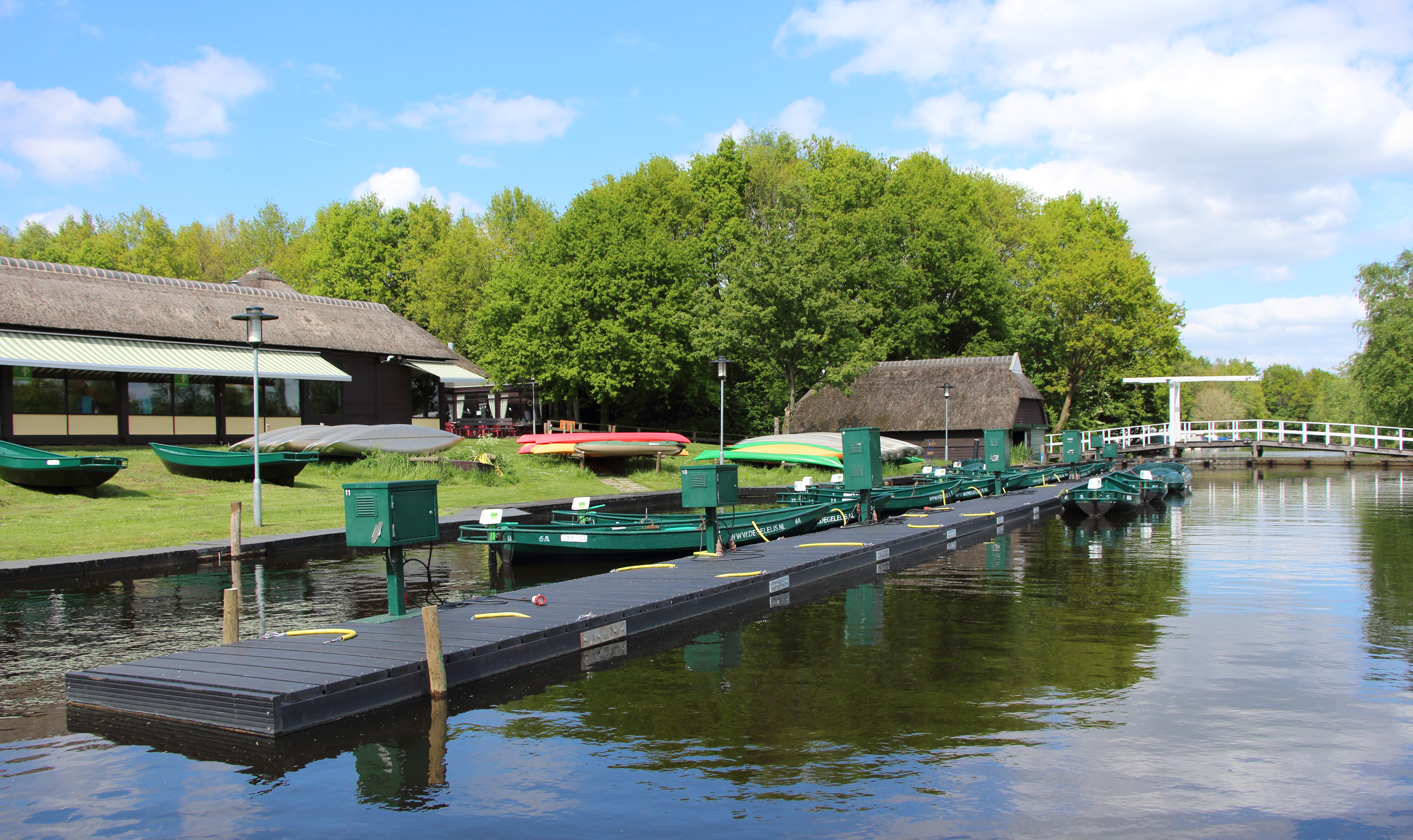
Visitor Centre Ossenzijl from the riverside

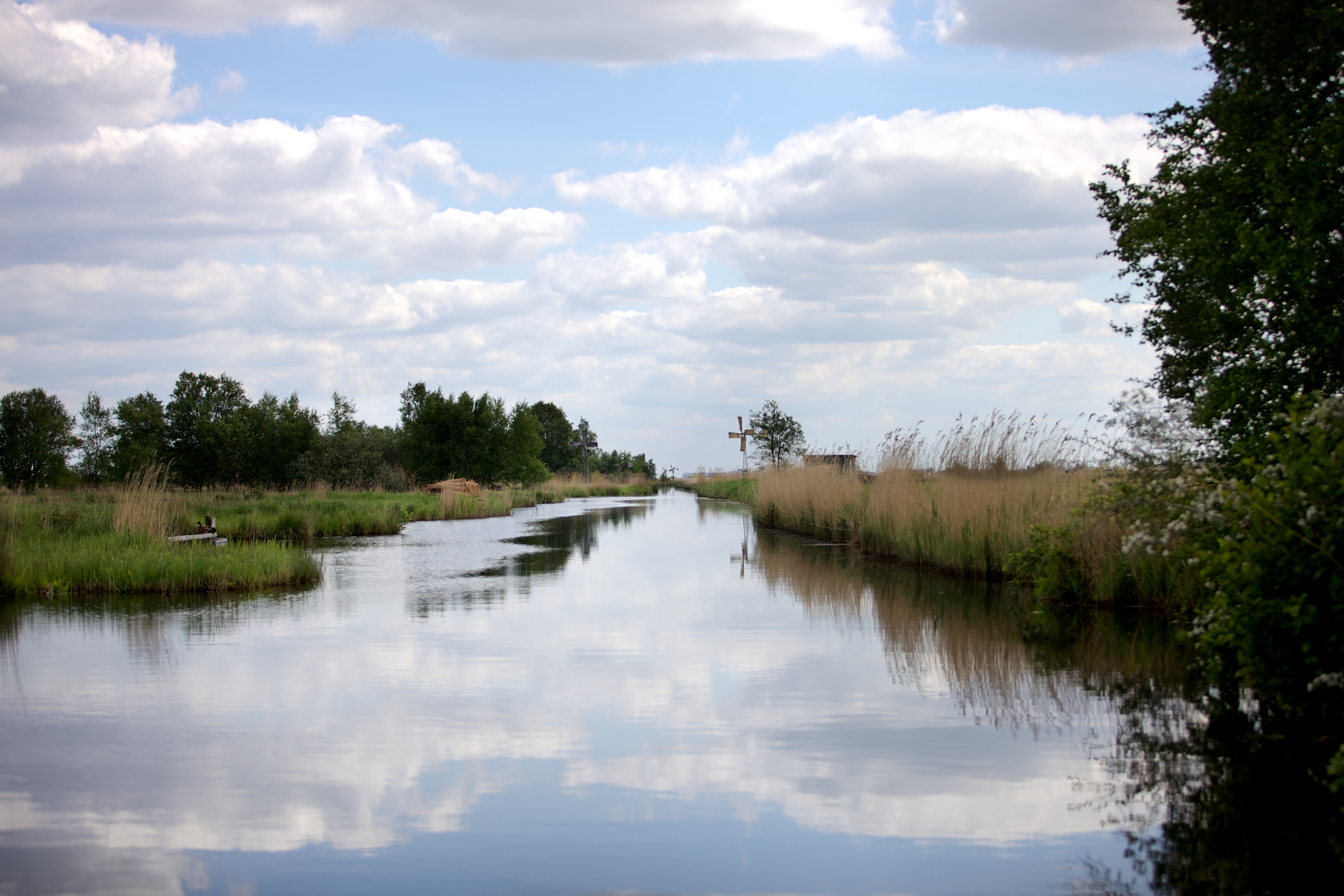
Weerribben

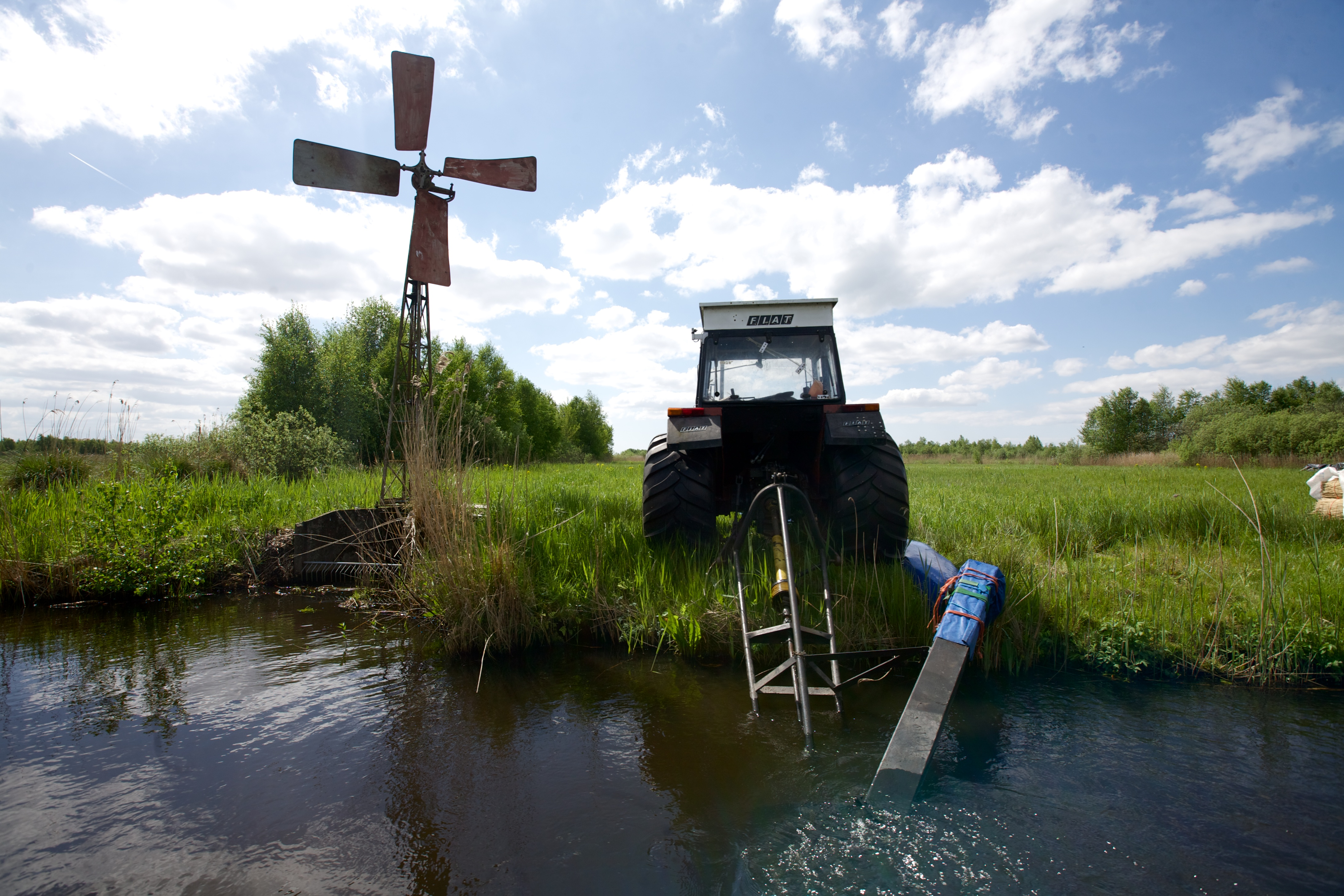
Waterpump in the Weerribben

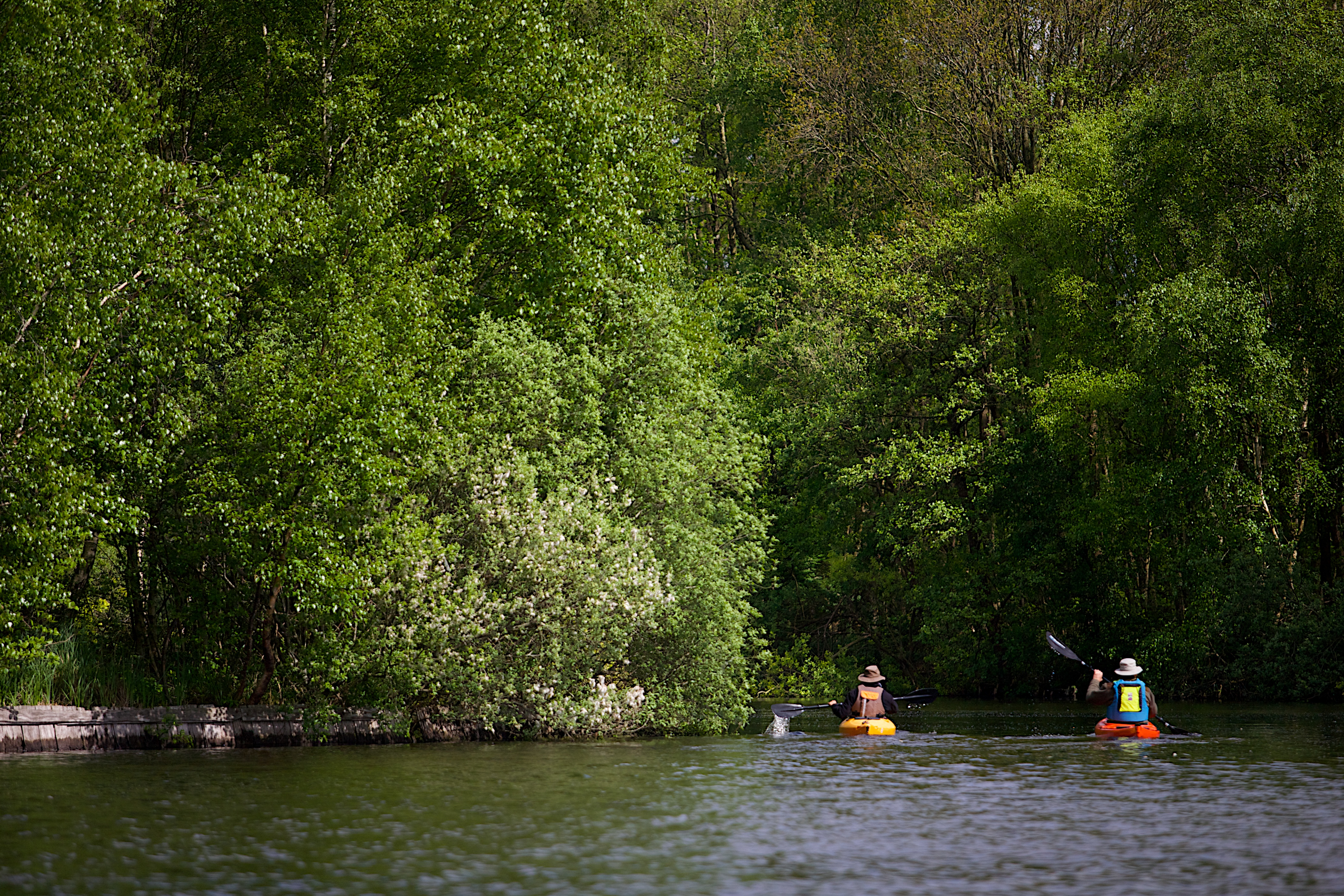
Canoeist in the Weerribben
