= Ossenzijl =

- Village
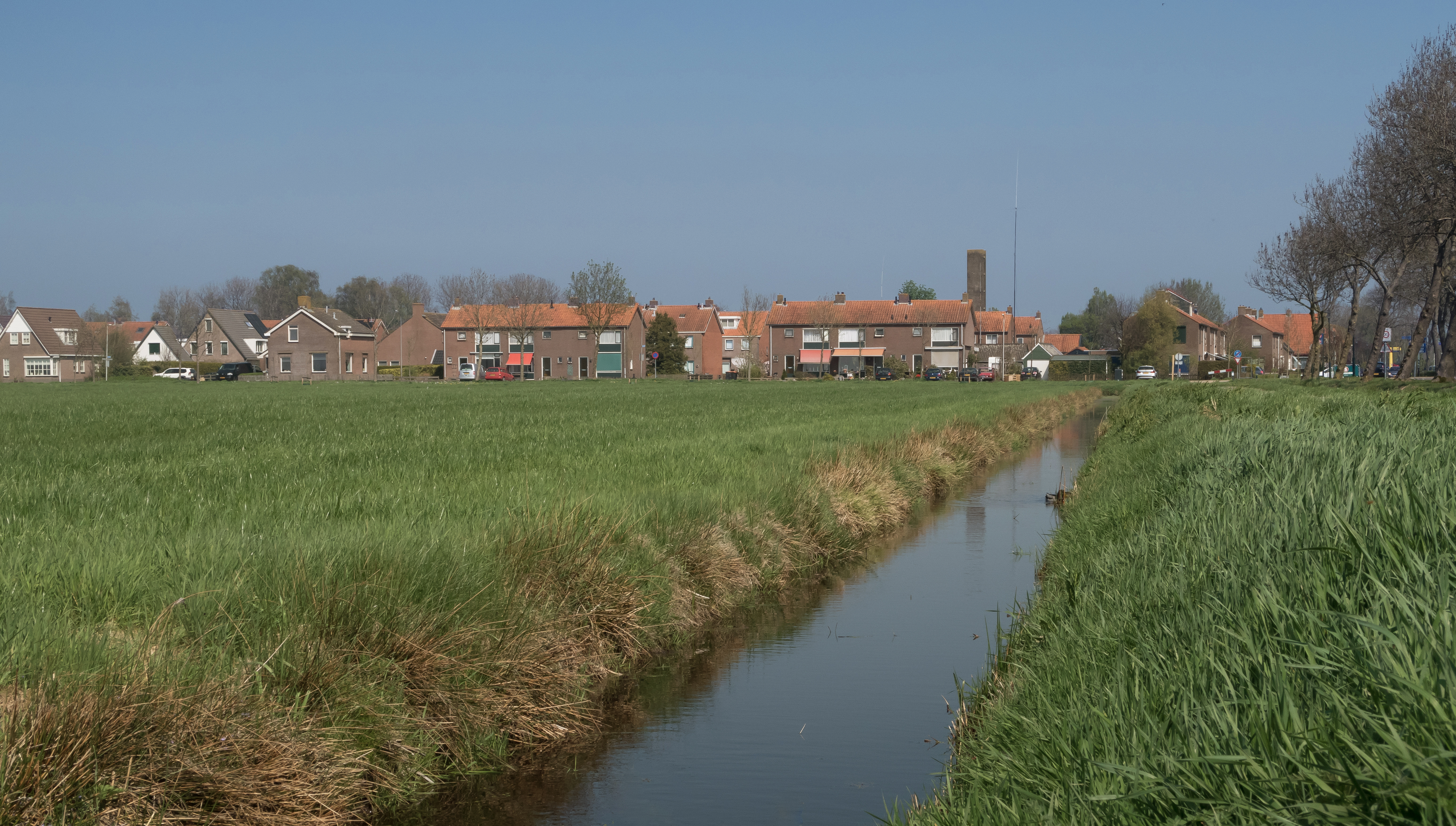
- View on the village

- Flag

- Location in the Netherlands Ossenzijl (Netherlands)
- Coordinates: 52.8084°N 5.9173°E
- Country: Netherlands
- Province: Overijssel
- Municipality: Steenwijkerland

Area
  - Total: 15.67 km^{2} (6.05 sq mi)
- Elevation: −0.4 m (−1.3 ft)

Population (2021)
  - Total: 565
  - Density: 36.1/km^{2} (93.4/sq mi)
- Time zone: UTC+1 (CET)
  - Summer (DST): UTC+2 (CEST)
- Postal code: 8376
- Dialing code: 0561

Ossenzijl (Dutch Low Saxon: Ossenziel) is a village in the municipality Steenwijkerland of the Dutch province of Overijssel. It started as a sluice owned by the Osse family. It is an entry point to the Weerribben-Wieden National Park.

== History ==
The village was first mentioned in 1437 as Ossenzyle, and refers to a sluice which was owned by the Osse family. The original sluice was destroyed in 1570, and rebuilt in 1790. Ossenzijl developed into a harbour village for peat export. In 1840, it was home to 281 people. In 1930, the sluice was removed. Several small windmills have been built on the edge of the Weerribben, including two tjaskers, little windmills for drainage.

Ossenzijl serves as one of the entry points to the Weerribben, a large bog, and the Frisian Lakes. After World War II, the village became a tourist destination. Many of the houses were rebuilt as a holiday homes, and a marina was added to the village. The Weerribben was declared a national park in 1992. In 2009, De Wieden was added forming a 105 square kilometres (41 sq mi) nature area.

== Notable people ==
- Richard Veenstra (born 1981), darts player

== Gallery ==
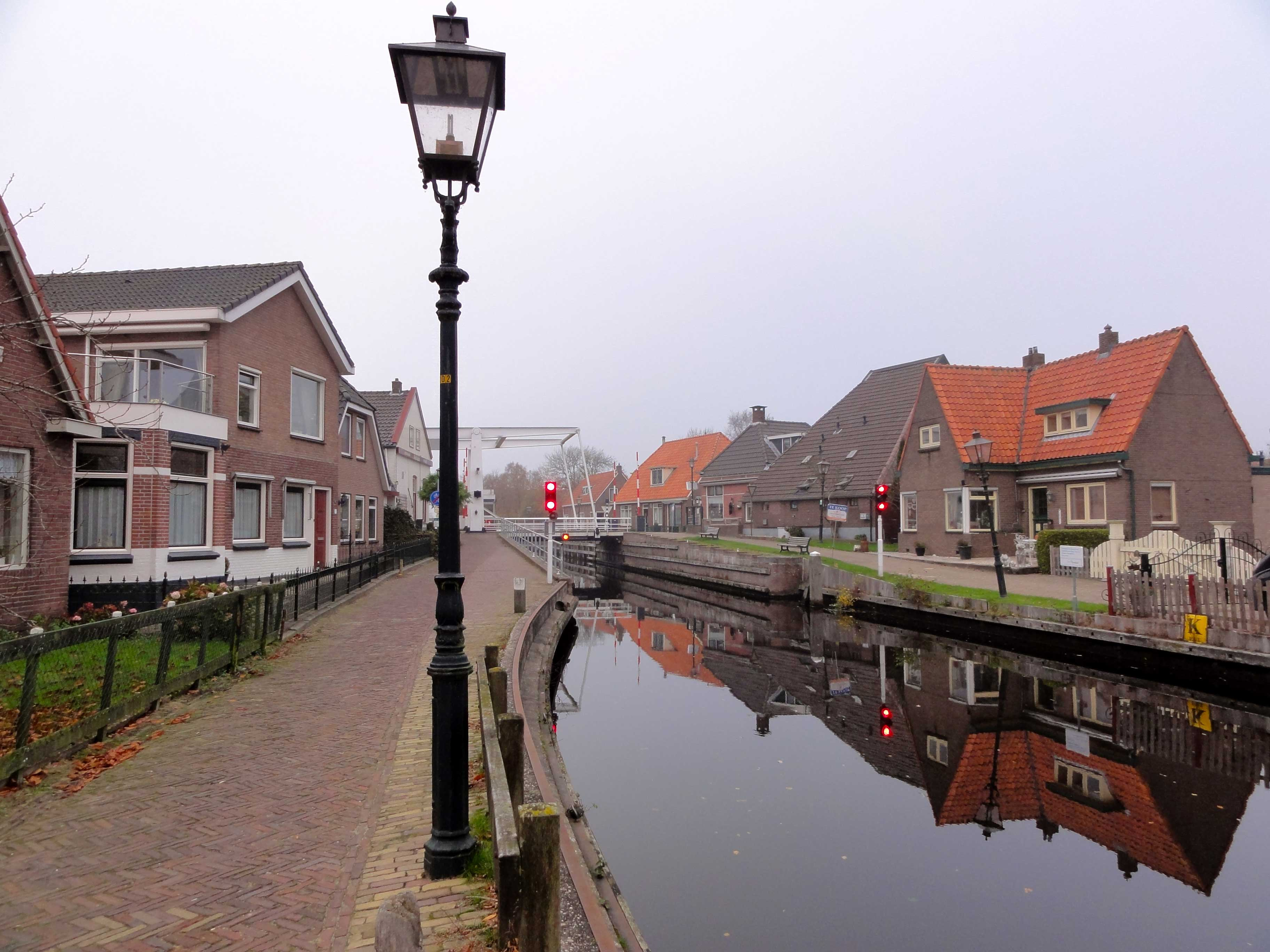
Village street

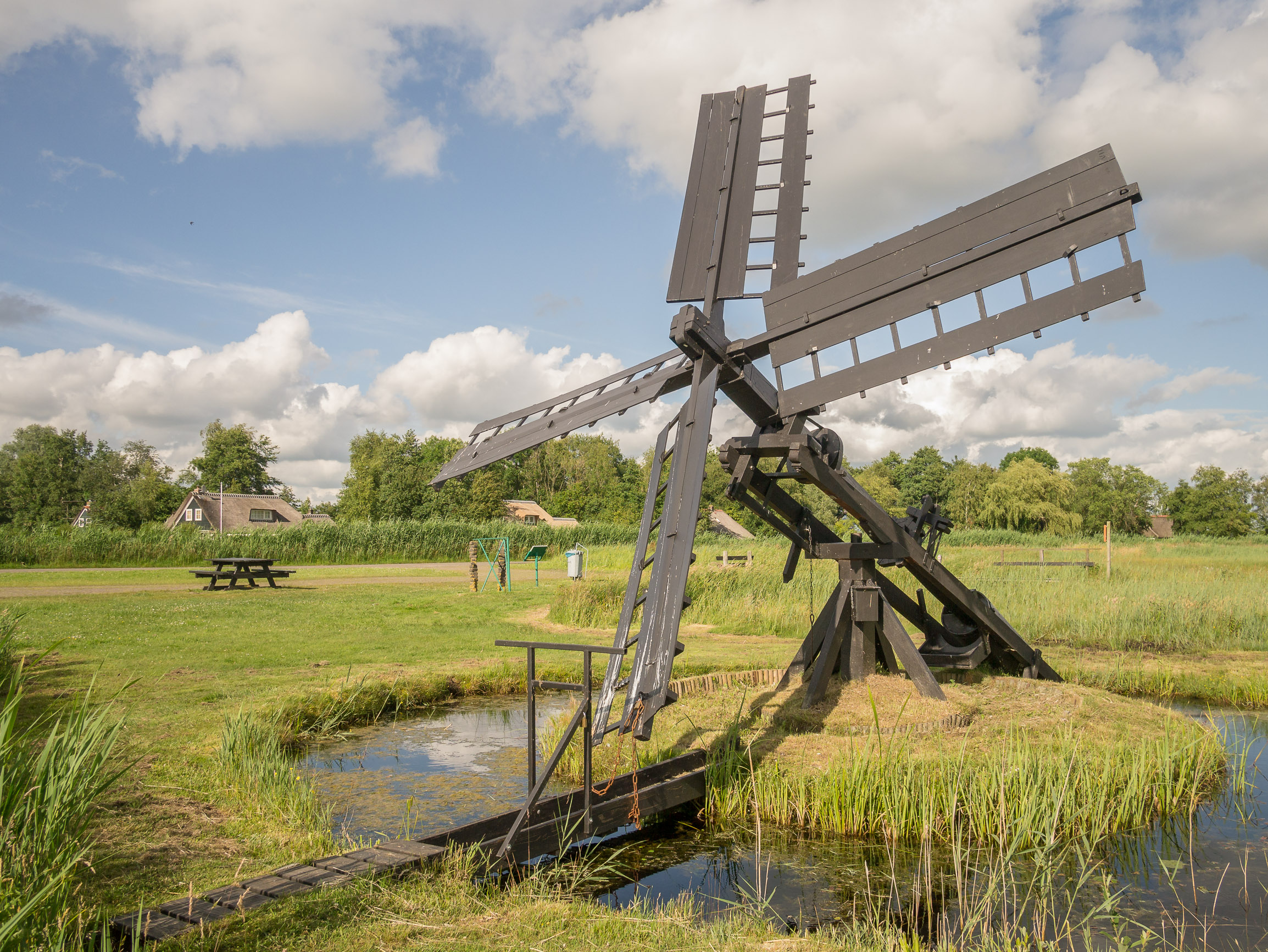
Tjasker

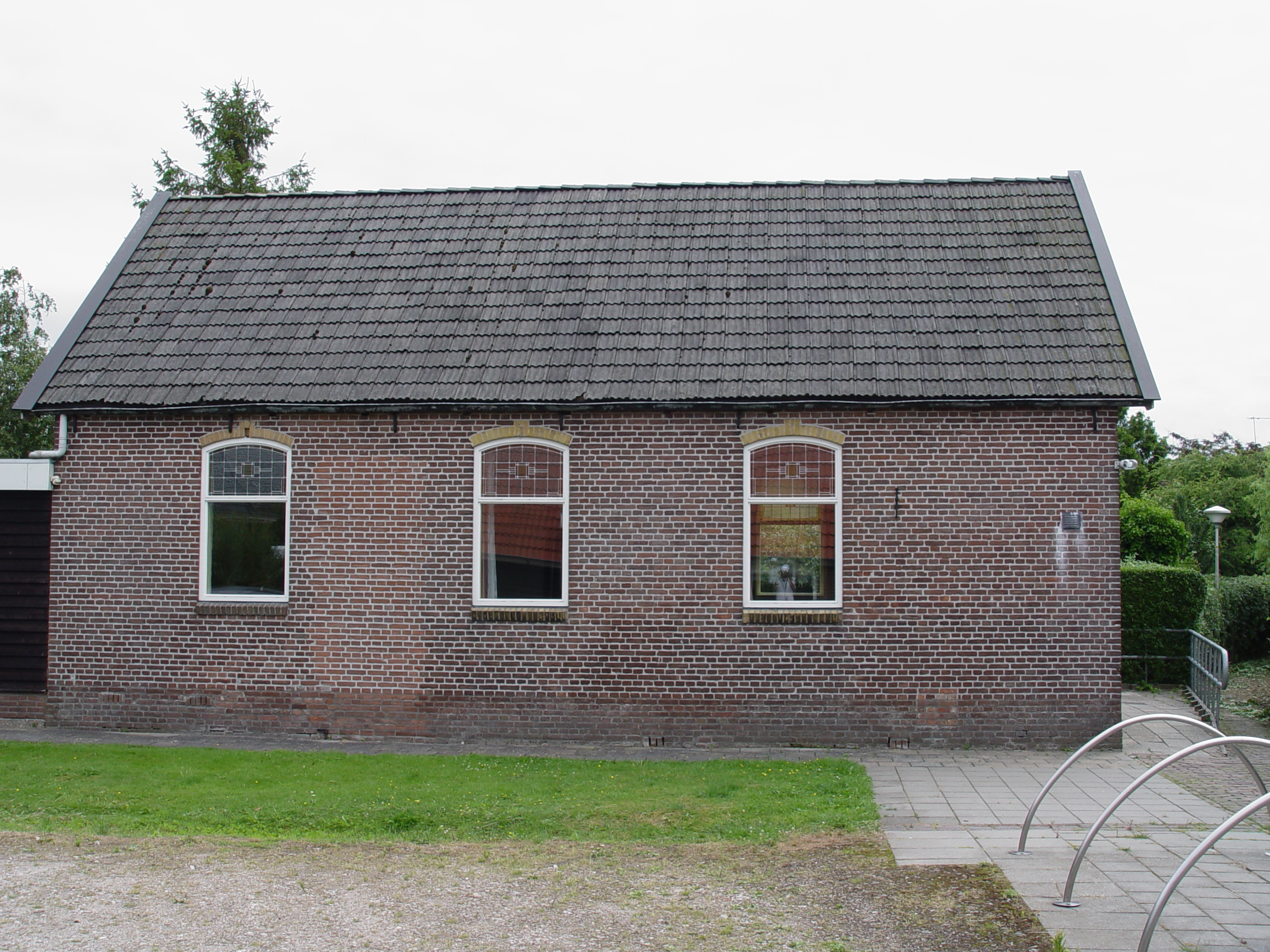
Little Rehoboth church

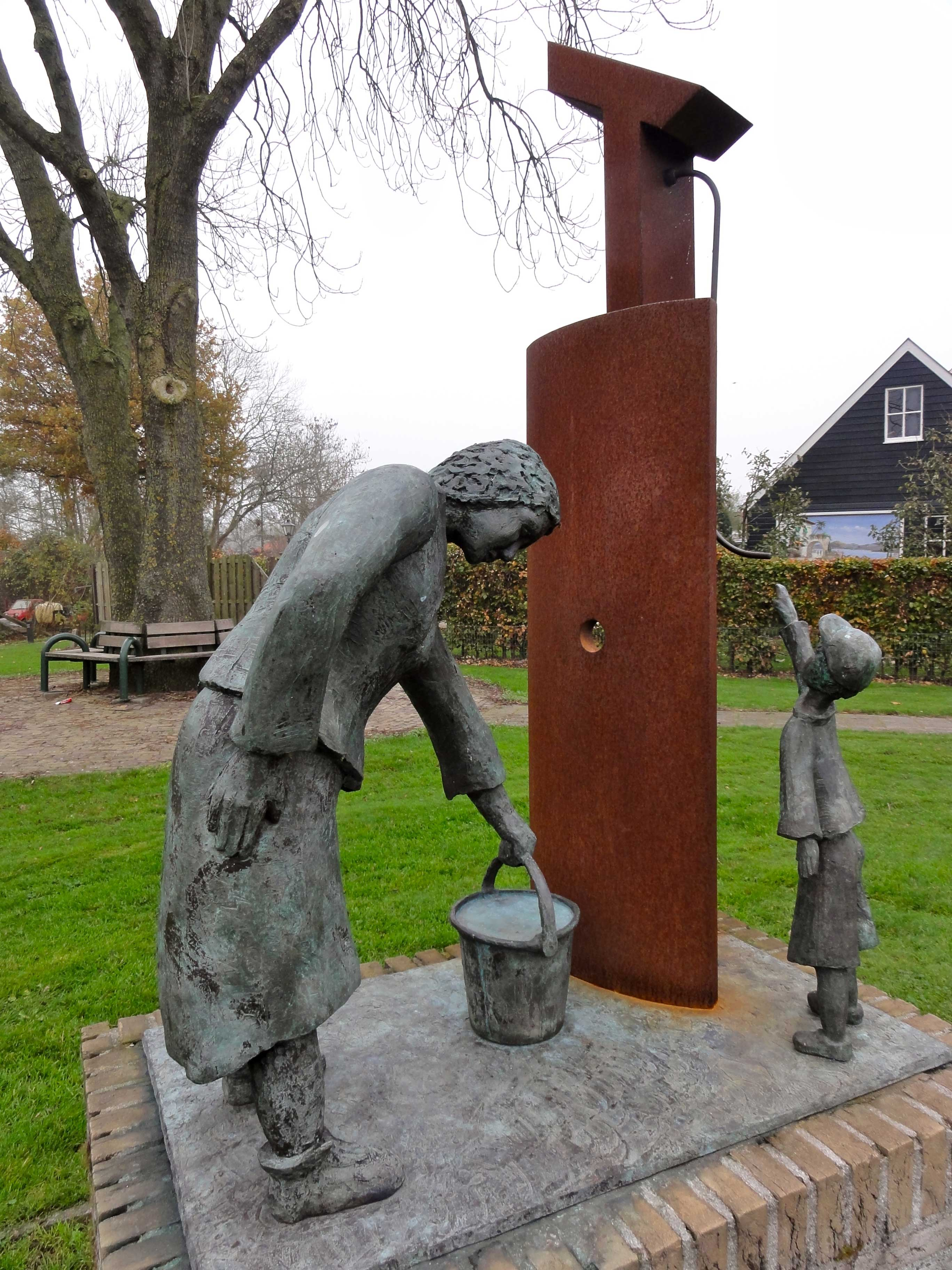
Well statue by Hanneke Pereboom
