= Kalenberg, Overijssel =

Kalenberg Kaelebarg
- Hamlet
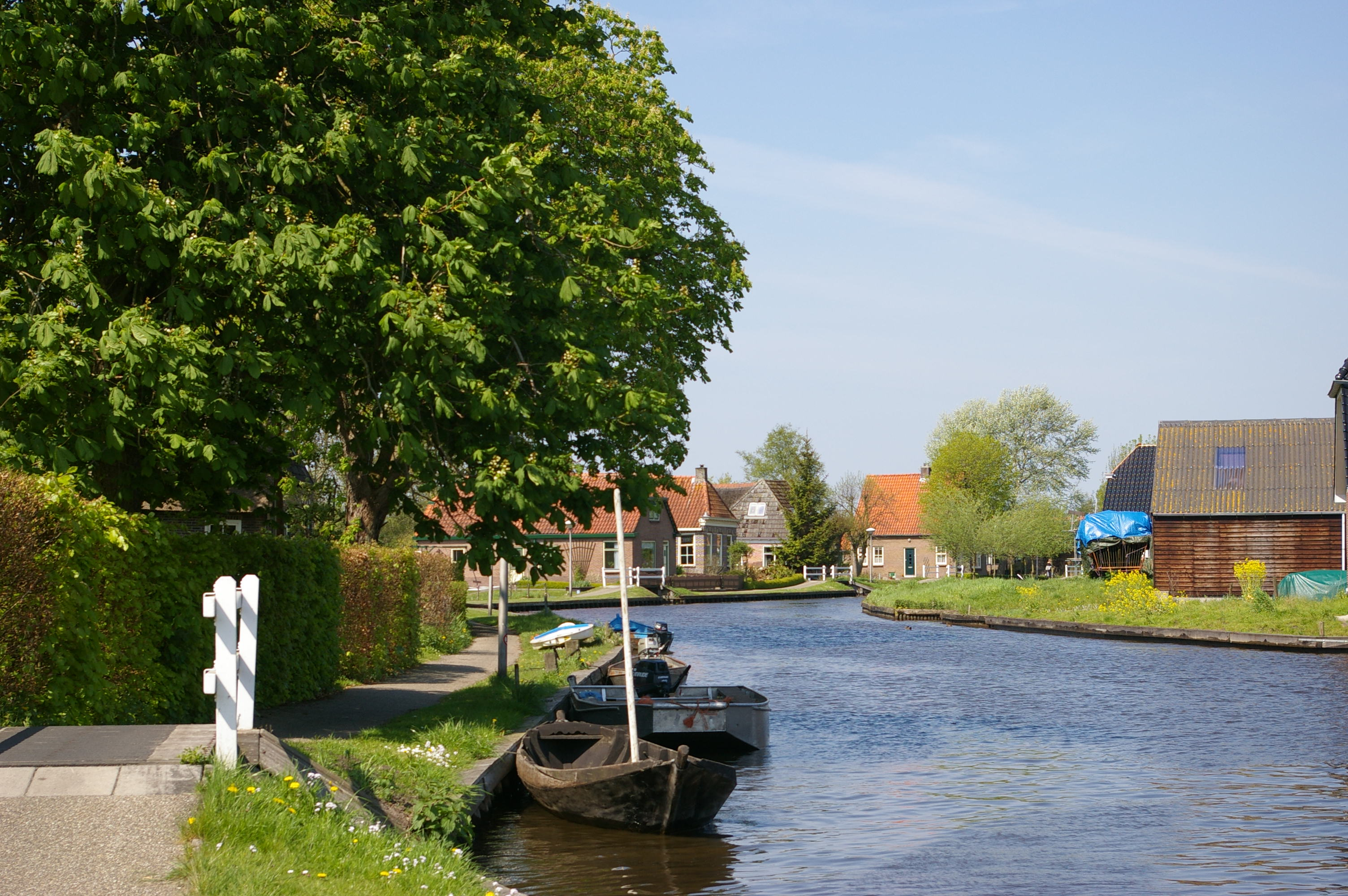
- View on the village

- Location in the Netherlands Kalenberg (Netherlands)
- Coordinates: 52.8084°N 5.9173°E
- Country: Netherlands
- Province: Overijssel
- Municipality: Steenwijkerland

Area
  - Total: 11.98 km^{2} (4.63 sq mi)
- Elevation: −0.4 m (−1.3 ft)

Population (2021)
  - Total: 220
  - Density: 18/km^{2} (48/sq mi)
- Time zone: UTC+1 (CET)
  - Summer (DST): UTC+2 (CEST)
- Postal code: 8377
- Dialing code: 0561

Kalenberg (Low Saxon: Kaelebarg) is a tourist hamlet within the De Weerribben-Wieden National Park in the Dutch province of Overijssel. The hamlet belongs to the municipality of Steenwijkerland.

It was first mentioned in 1845 as Kalemberg, and means "bare hill". Kalenberg started as a peat excavation village. Later, it became an agricultural community. In 1840, it was home to 272 people. Nowadays, the economy is mainly based on tourism due to its location inside the Weerribben-Wieden National Park.

== Gallery ==
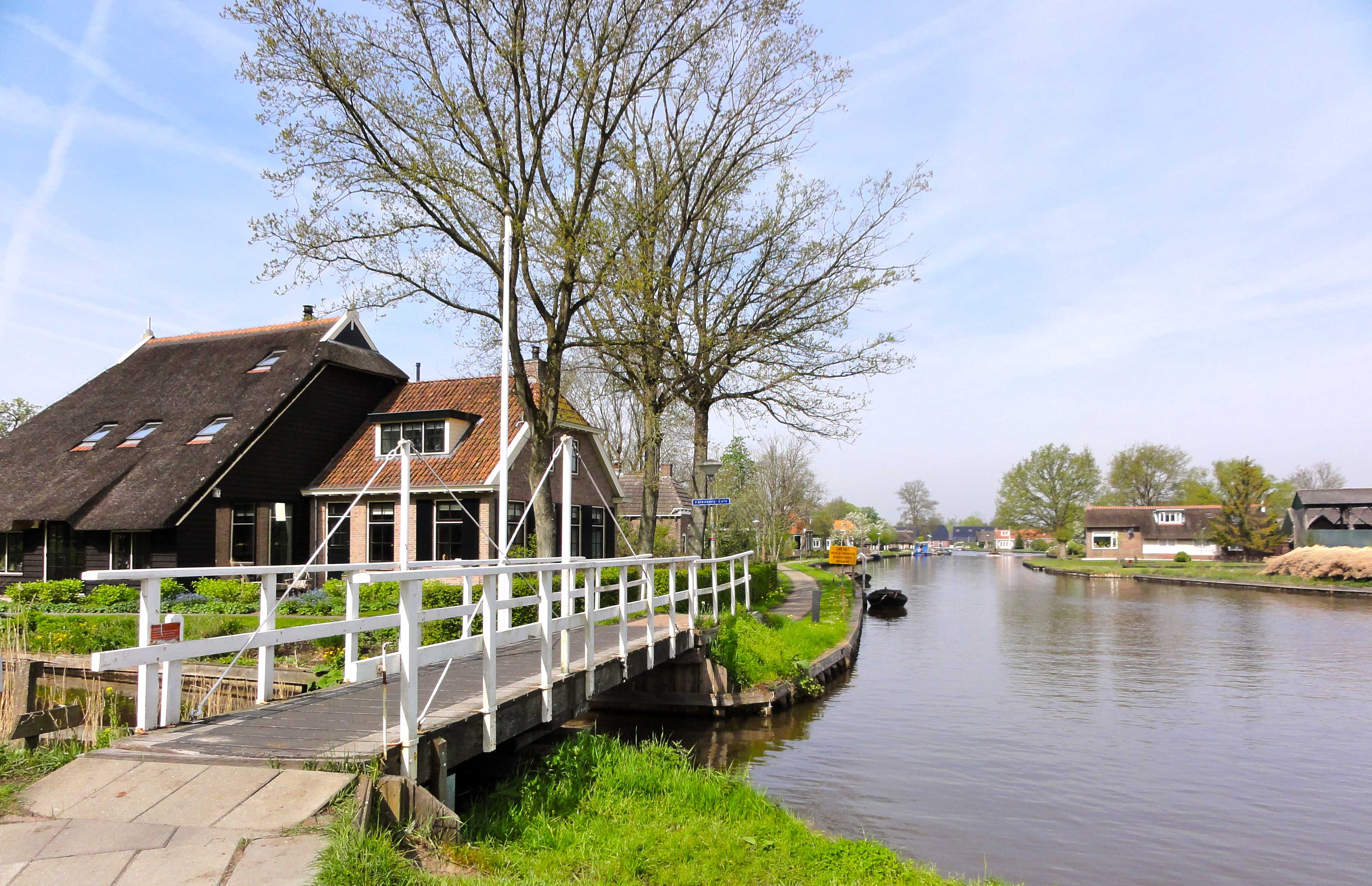
Farms in the village

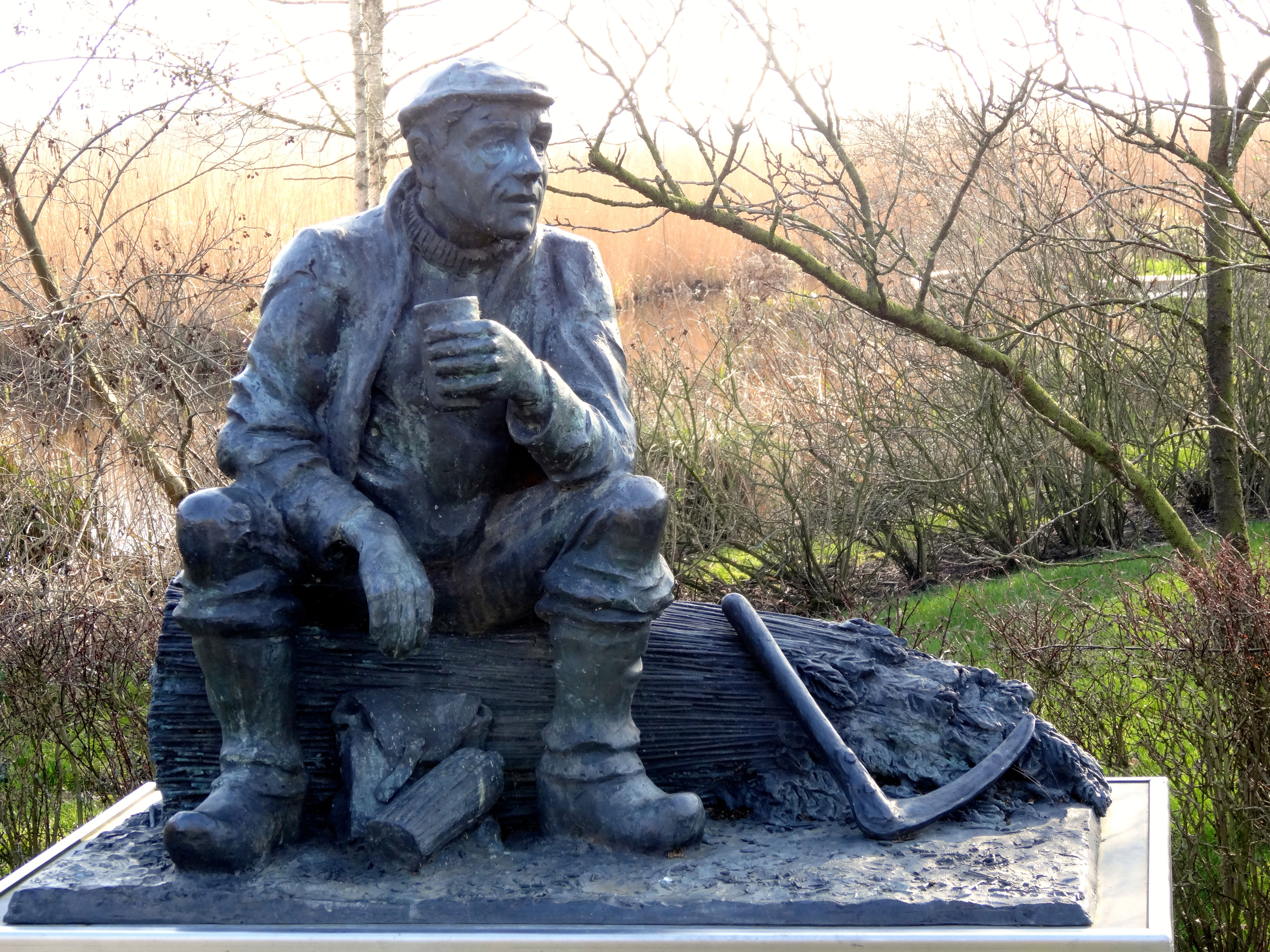
Statue in Kalenberg

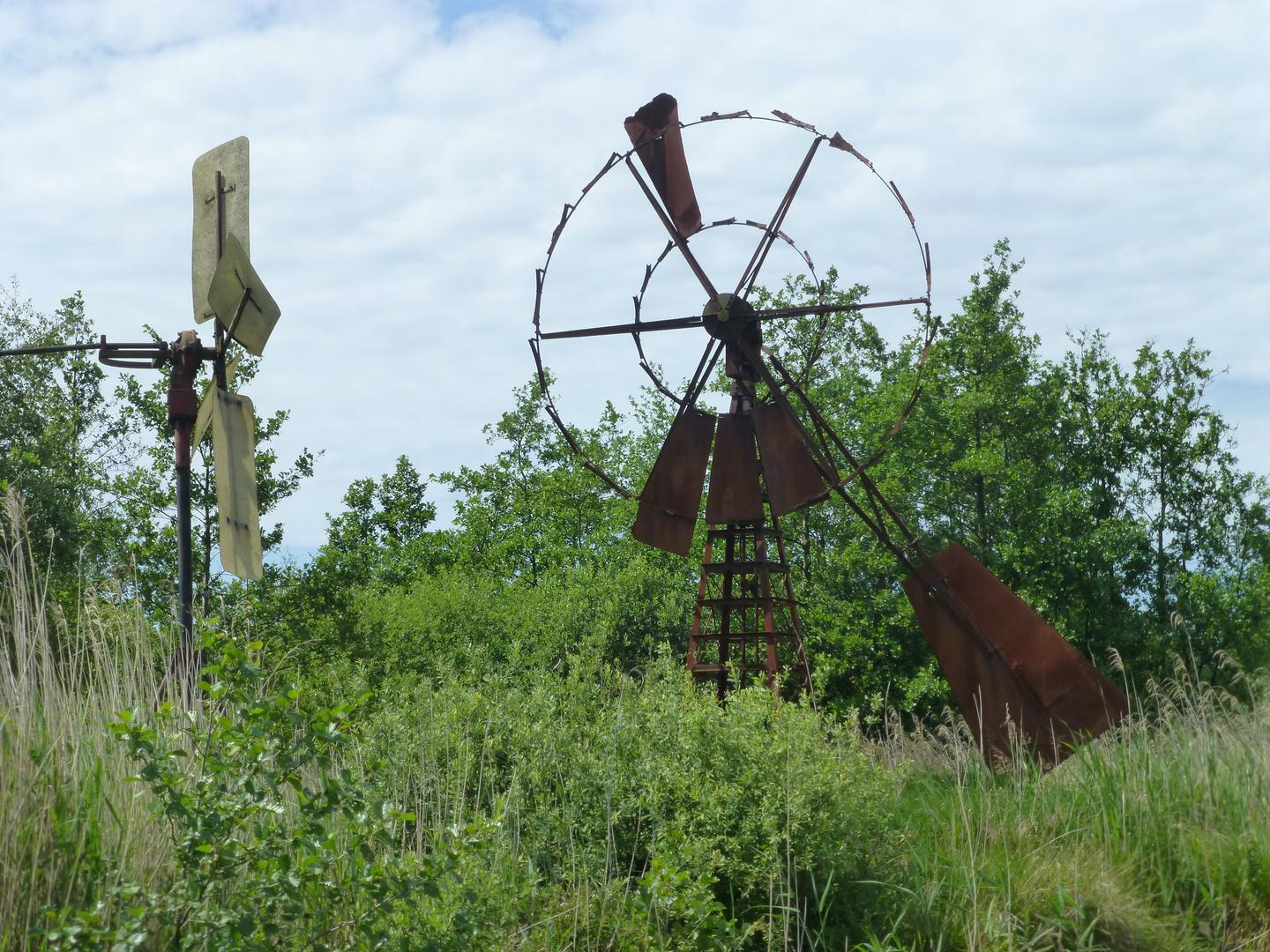
Swaps of the Weerribben

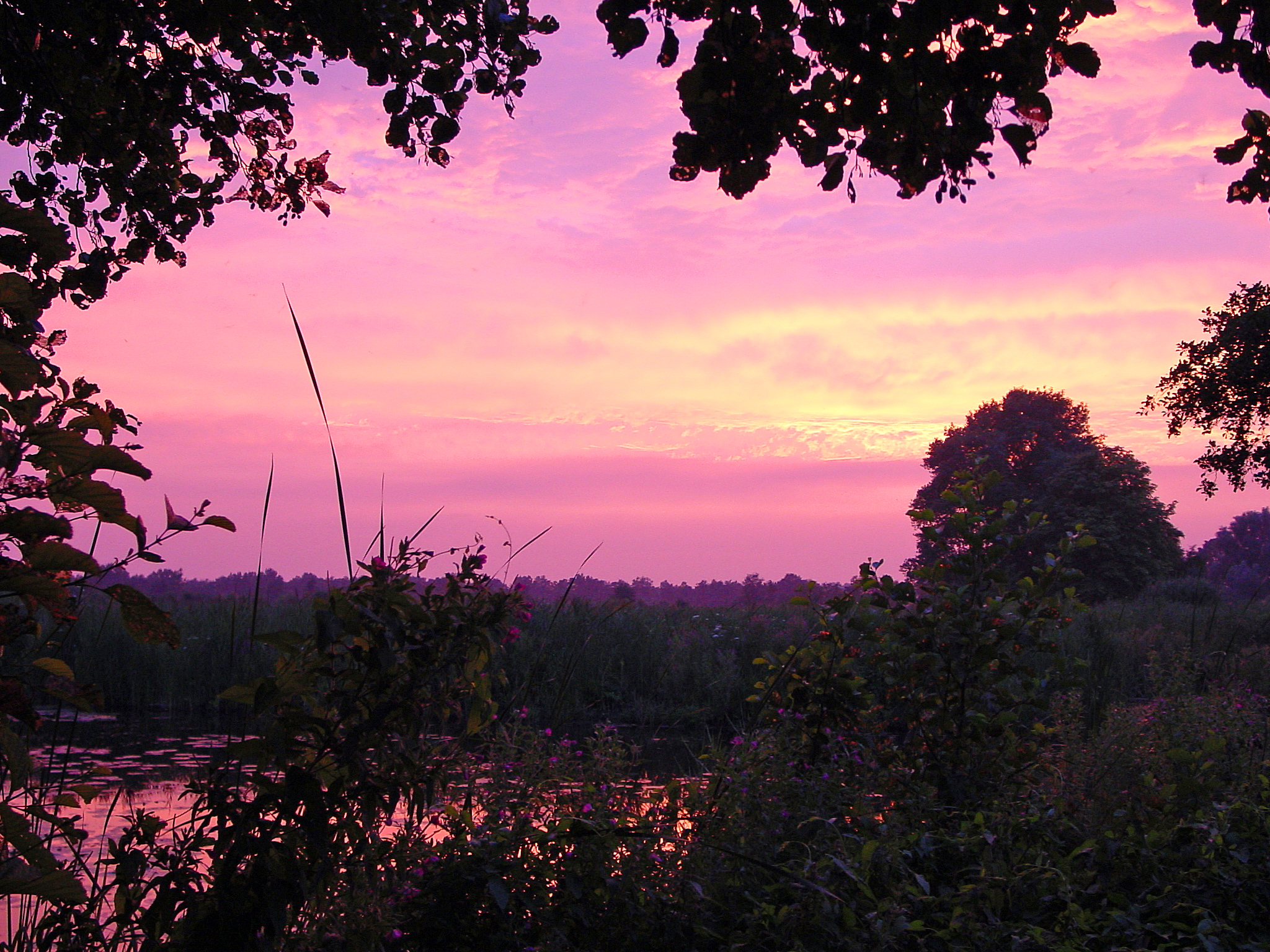
Sunset on the Weerribben
