= Sint Jansklooster =

Sint Jansklooster ′t Klooster
- Village
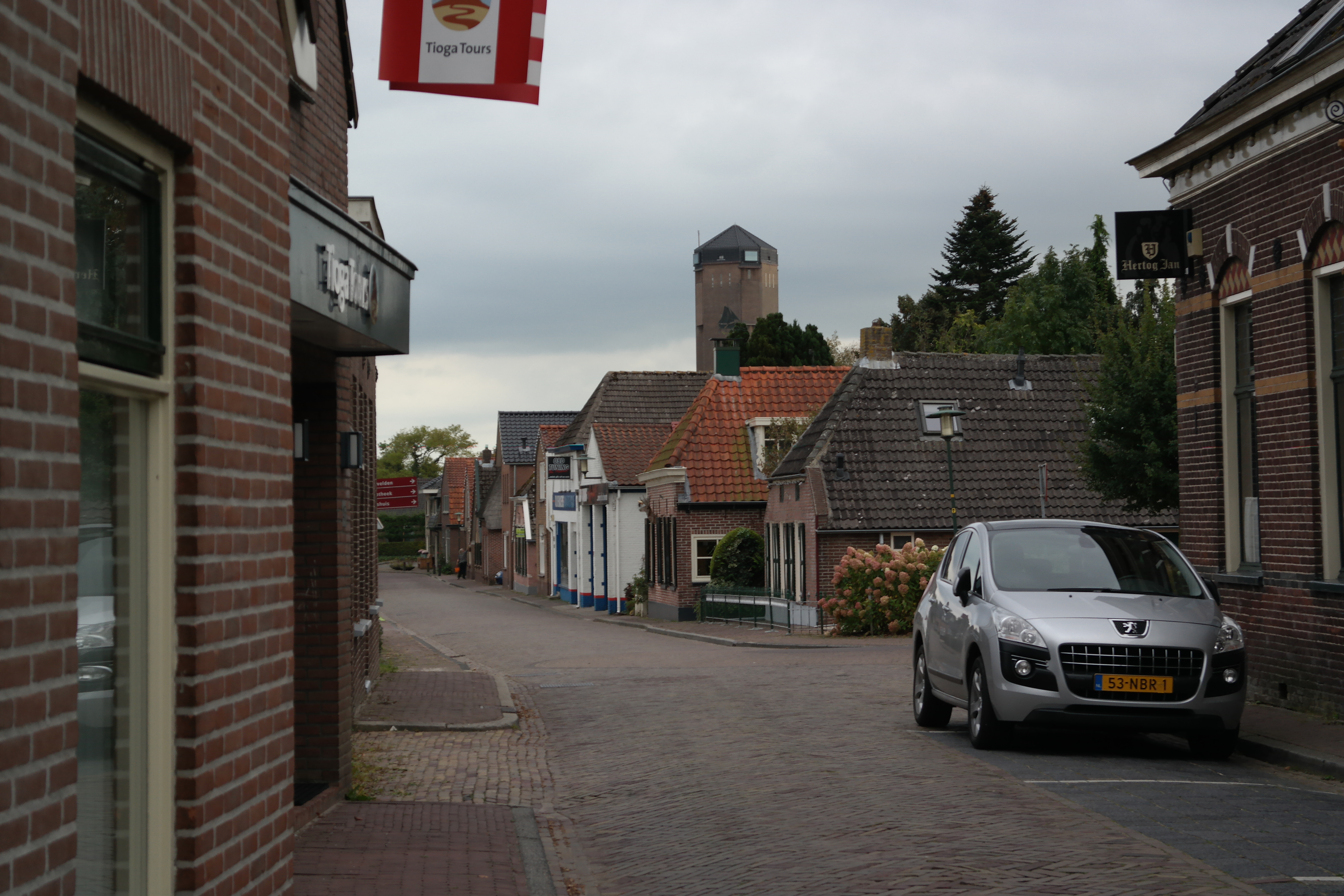
- Village street with the water tower in the background

- Flag

- Location in the Netherlands Sint Jansklooster (Netherlands)
- Coordinates: 52.6780°N 6.0041°E
- Country: Netherlands
- Province: Overijssel
- Municipality: Steenwijkerland
- Established: 1399

Area
  - Total: 25.39 km^{2} (9.80 sq mi)
- Elevation: 3 m (9.8 ft)

Population (2021)
  - Total: 2,500
  - Density: 98/km^{2} (260/sq mi)
- Time zone: UTC+1 (CET)
  - Summer (DST): UTC+2 (CEST)
- Postal code: 8326
- Dialing code: 0527

Sint Jansklooster (Dutch Low Saxon: ′t Klooster) is a village in the municipality Steenwijkerland of the Dutch province of Overijssel. It started as a monastery. The village is located near the Weerribben-Wieden National Park, and organises an annual bloemencorso (flower parade).

== History ==
Sint Jansklooster started as a Franciscan monastery founded in 1399 by Johannes van Ommen. In 1409, the settlement was first attested as Campus S. Joannis. The monastery was destroyed in 1581 during the Siege of Steenwijk. The village became an agricultural community and its economy was partially based on peat excavation of the surrounding bogs. In 1840, it was home to 250 people. The Monnikenmolen is a gristmill constructed in 1857 as a replacement of a 1780 mill. It was restored in 1996. During the early 20th century, Sint Jansklooster started to develop.

In 1932, a 46 metres (151 ft) tall water tower was constructed near the village. In the late 20th century, the water tower became obsolete. It was bought by an industrial heritage foundation in 2009, and was redeveloped into a watchtower for the national park. It reopened in 2014, and has 207 steps to the top.

Since 1986, Sint Jansklooster organises an annual bloemencorso (flower parade) on the third Friday of August. The floats in the parade are made of dahlias. The nearby De Wieden, a large bog, was declared a national park in 2009, and added to the Weerribben forming the 105 square kilometres (41 sq mi) Weerribben-Wieden National Park.

== Gallery ==
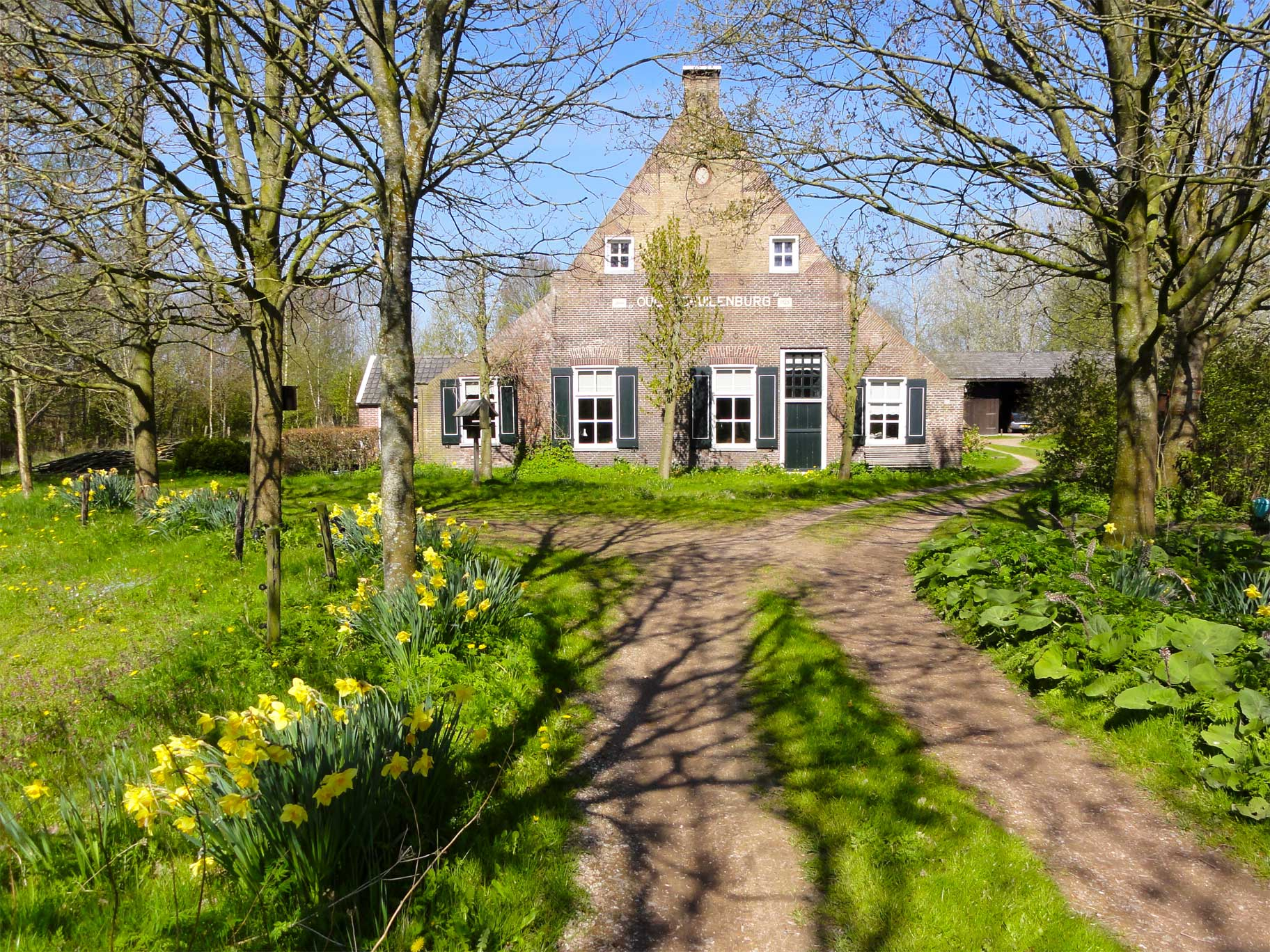
Farm "Oud Schuilenburg"

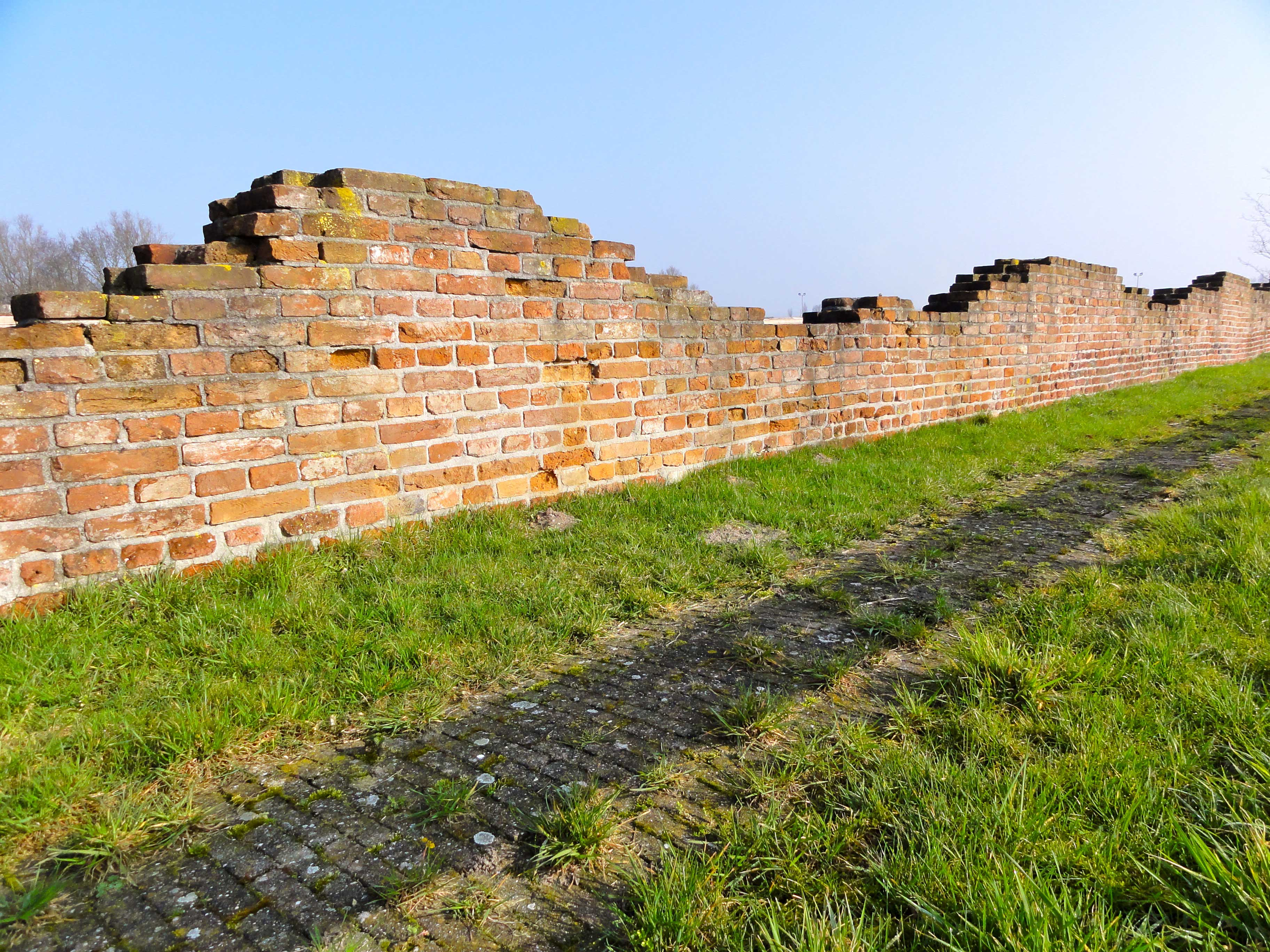
Remnant of the monastery

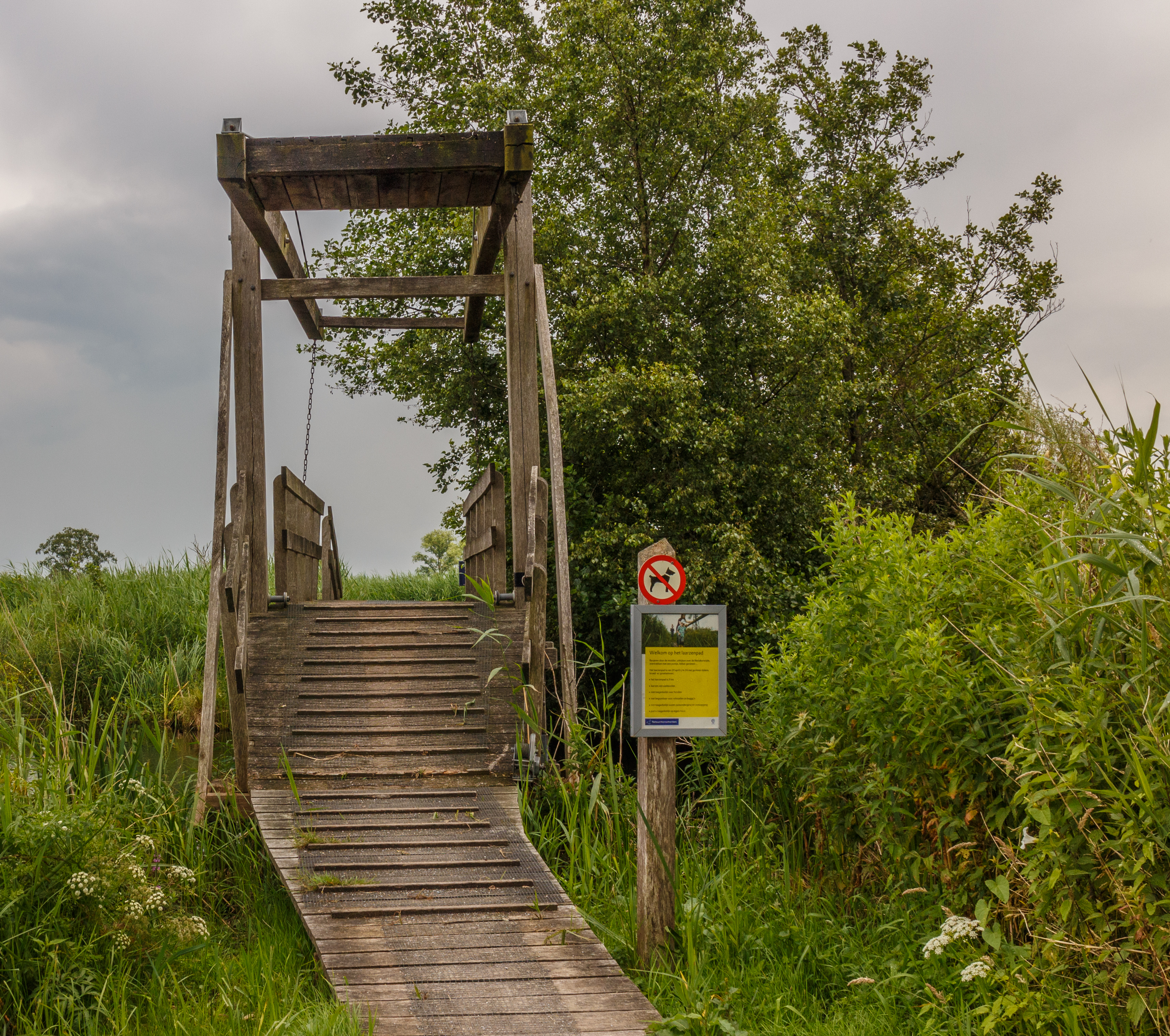
Path through the Wieden
