= Aekinga =

Aekinga Aekinge (Stellingwerfs)
- Hamlet
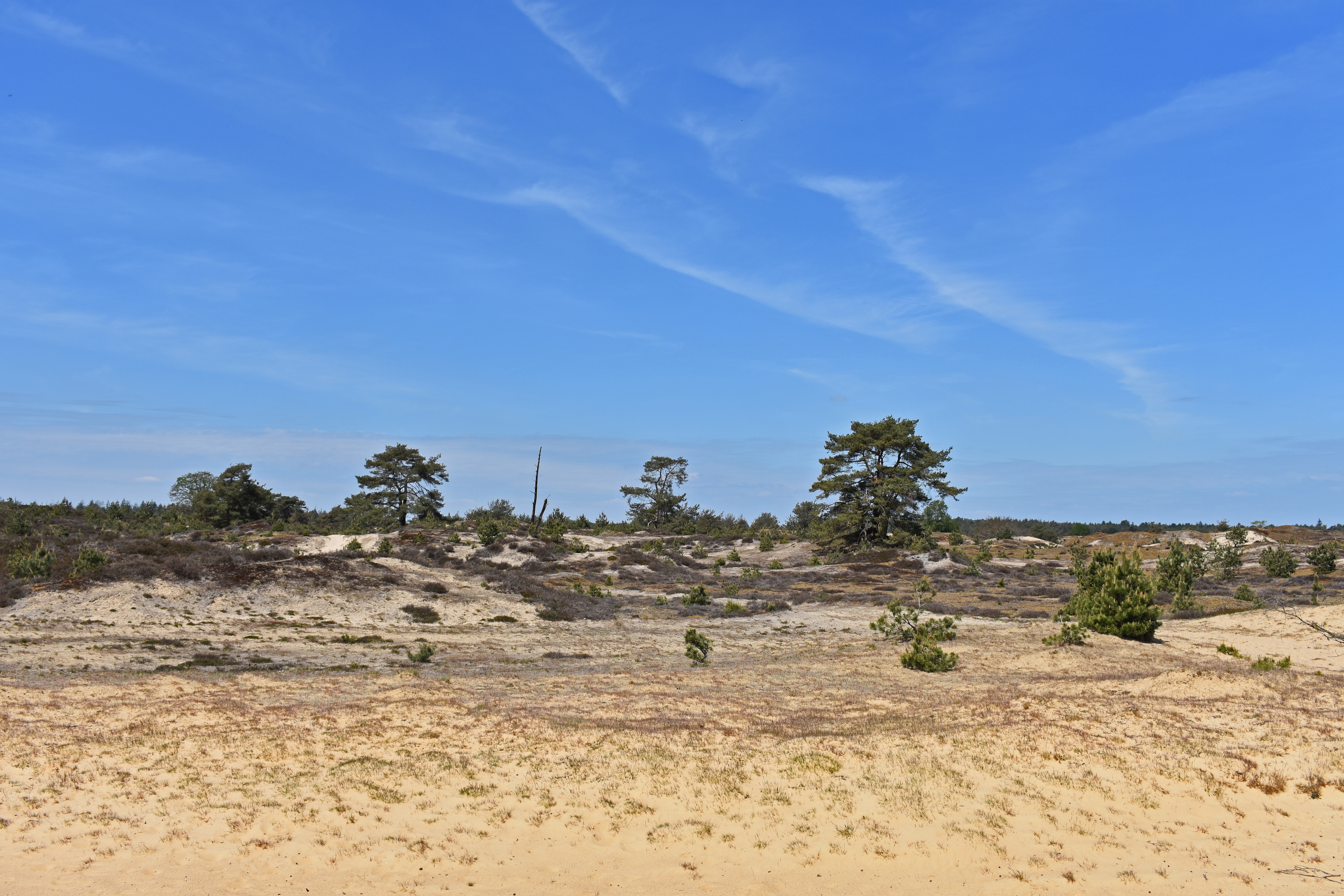
- Aekingerzand near Aekinga

- Location in the province of Friesland in the Netherlands Aekinga (Netherlands)
- Coordinates: 52°57′N 6°19′E
- Country: Netherlands
- Province: Friesland
- Municipality: Ooststellingwerf
- Village: Appelscha
- Elevation: 10.2 m (33 ft)

Population
  - Total: c. 40
- Time zone: UTC+1 (CET)
  - Summer (DST): UTC+2 (CEST)
- Postcode: 8426
- Area code: 0516

Aekinga (Dutch: [ˈeːkɪŋɣaː]; Stellingwerfs: Aekinge; West Frisian: Aekingea) is a hamlet in the Dutch municipality of Ooststellingwerf in the province of Friesland. The hamlet consists of approximately 15 houses with 40 residents.

The hamlet is located southwest of Appelscha, of which it is officially a part. It is located on the edge of Drents-Friese Wold National Park. Aekingerzand, a sand drift that is part of the national park, is named after the hamlet. The eponymous main road of the hamlet of Aekinga runs from the old center of Appelscha, the Boerenstreek to the N381 where it comes to a dead end.

== History ==
In 1530 the hamlet was mentioned as Auckijnge in den kerspell van Appelssche, in the 17th century as Aeckinga, in 1861 as Aekinga and in 1877 as Akinga. The place name is probably derived from the Aekinga family, whose name is derived from the fact that they were people descended from a certain man named Aeke.

There was a boys' boarding school in the hamlet for a long time, the Aekinga boarding school. It opened its doors at the end of 1947. It was a fall boarding school. The last students left the vocational school in 2002 after it was finally decided in 2000 that the complex would be closed as a boarding school. The boarding school consisted of various buildings that were added and renovated over the years. The complex is located between the campsite and a holiday park.
