= Baanders =

Baanders is a Dutch occupational surname. "Baander" was a name for a ropemaker. Notable people of the name include the following:

- Herman Hendrik Baanders (1849–1905), Dutch architect
- Herman Ambrosius Jan Baanders (1876–1953), Dutch architect
- Nina Baanders-Kessler (1915–2002), Dutch sculptor and medalist
- Tine Baanders (1890–1971), Dutch illustrator and graphic designer
