= Elsloo =

Elsloo is the name of two towns in the Netherlands:

- Elsloo, Friesland, Ooststellingwerf municipality
- Elsloo, Limburg, Stein municipality
