= Haulerwijk =

Haulerwijk Haulerwyk
- Village
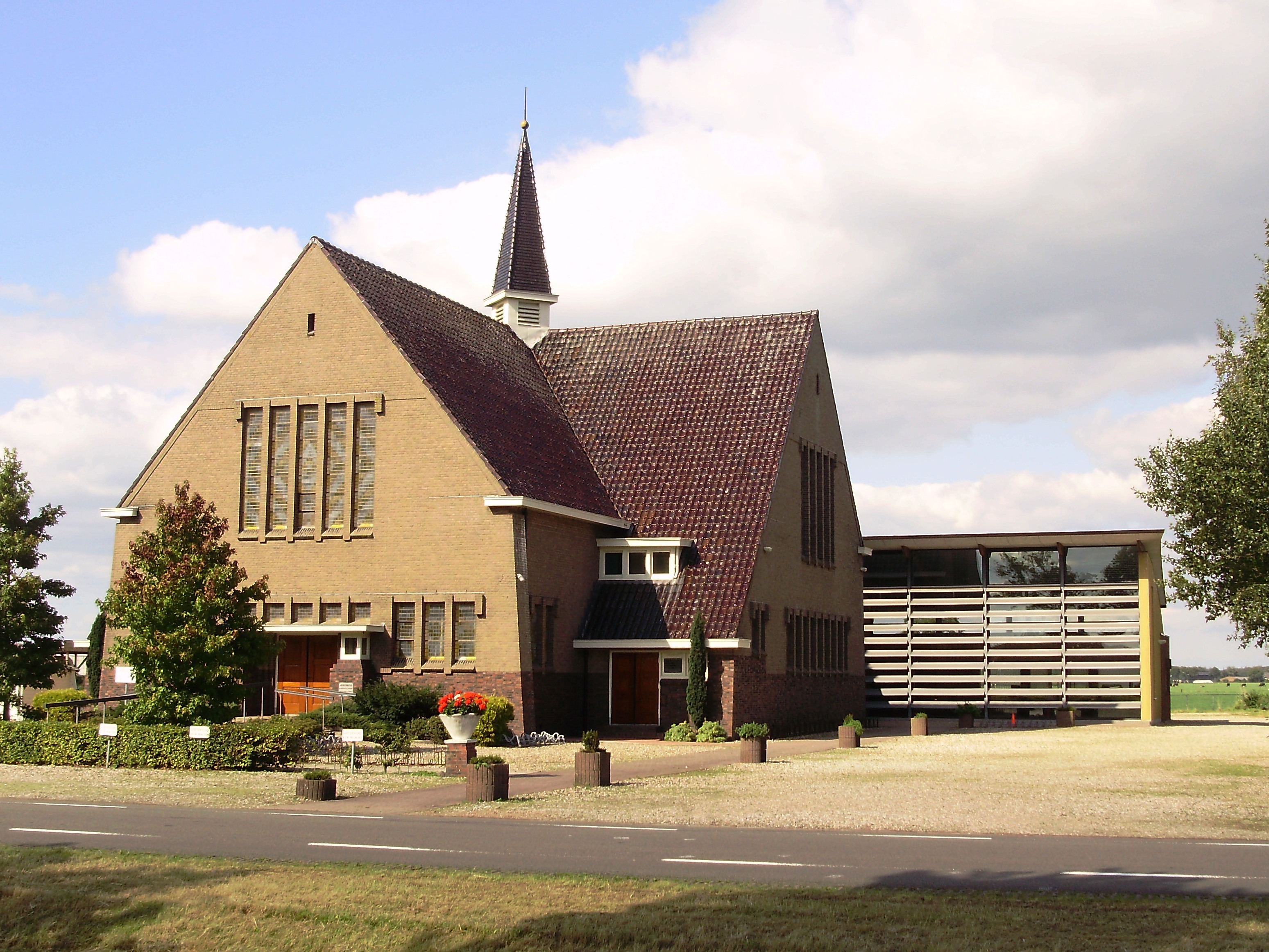
- Haulerwijk Church

- Coat of arms

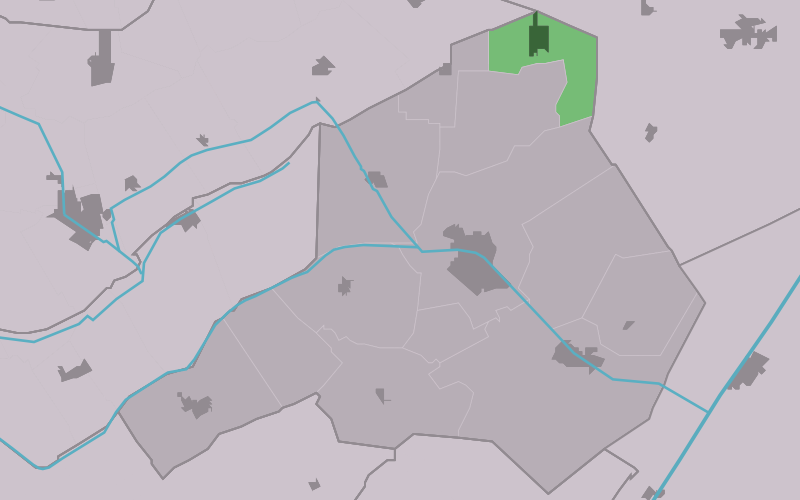
- Location in Ooststellingwerf municipality

- Location in the Netherlands Haulerwijk (Netherlands)
- Coordinates: 53°3′55″N 6°19′53″E
- Country: Netherlands
- Province: Friesland
- Municipality: Ooststellingwerf

Area
  - Total: 10.38 km^{2} (4.01 sq mi)
- Elevation: 7 m (23 ft)

Population (2021)
  - Total: 3,220
  - Density: 310/km^{2} (803/sq mi)
- Time zone: UTC+1 (CET)
  - Summer (DST): UTC+2 (CEST)
- Postal code: 8433
- Dialing code: 0516

Haulerwijk (West Frisian: Haulerwyk) is a village in the municipality of Ooststellingwerf in the east of Friesland, the Netherlands. In 2017, it had a population of around 3,300.

The village was first mentioned in 1844 as Haulerwijk, and means "canal of Haule". Haulerwijk started as a peat colony of the Drachtster Company along the Haulerwijkstervaart which was dug 1756. The Dutch Reformed church dates from 1852. In 1840, Haulerwijk was home to 69 people.

== Gallery ==
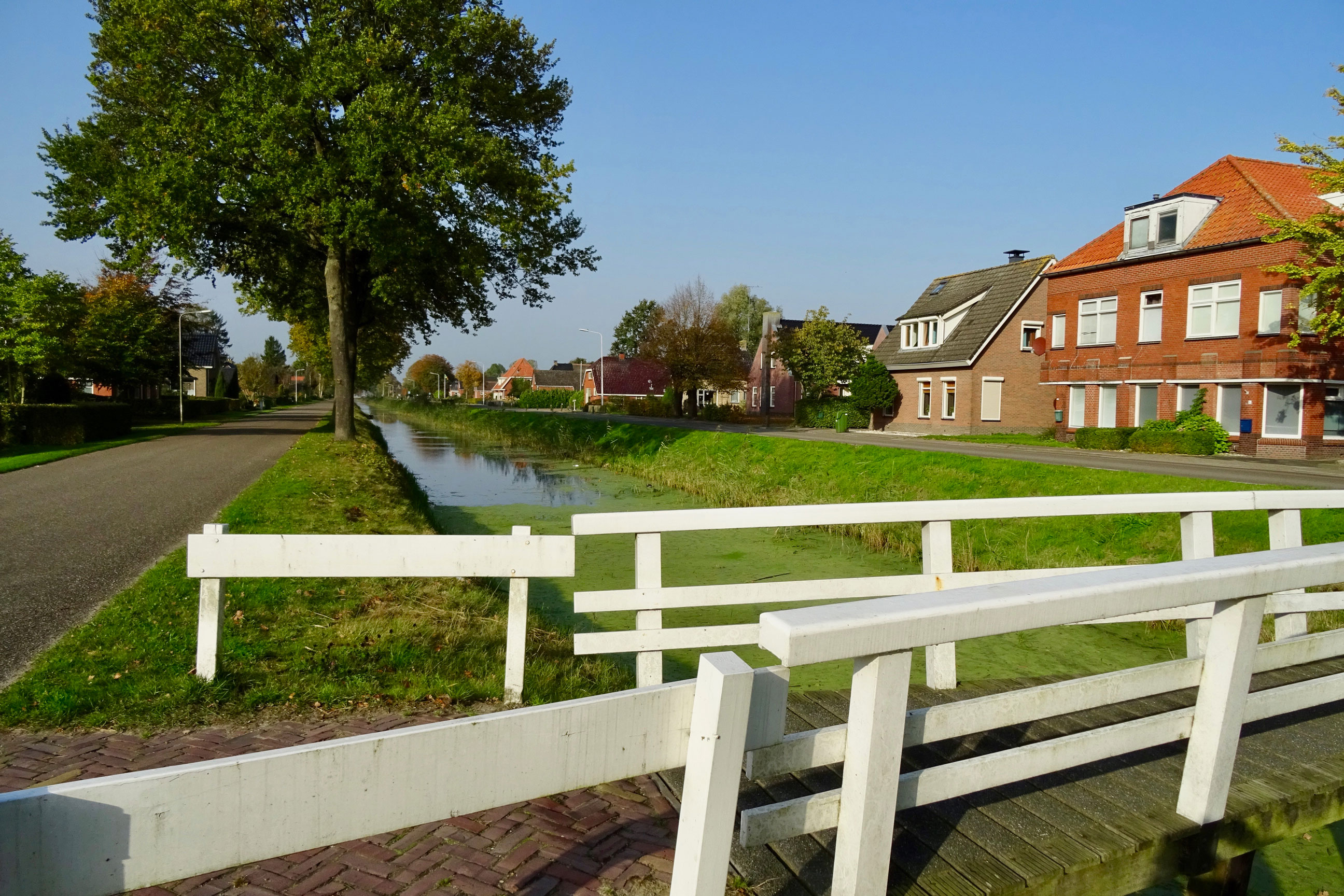
Canal view

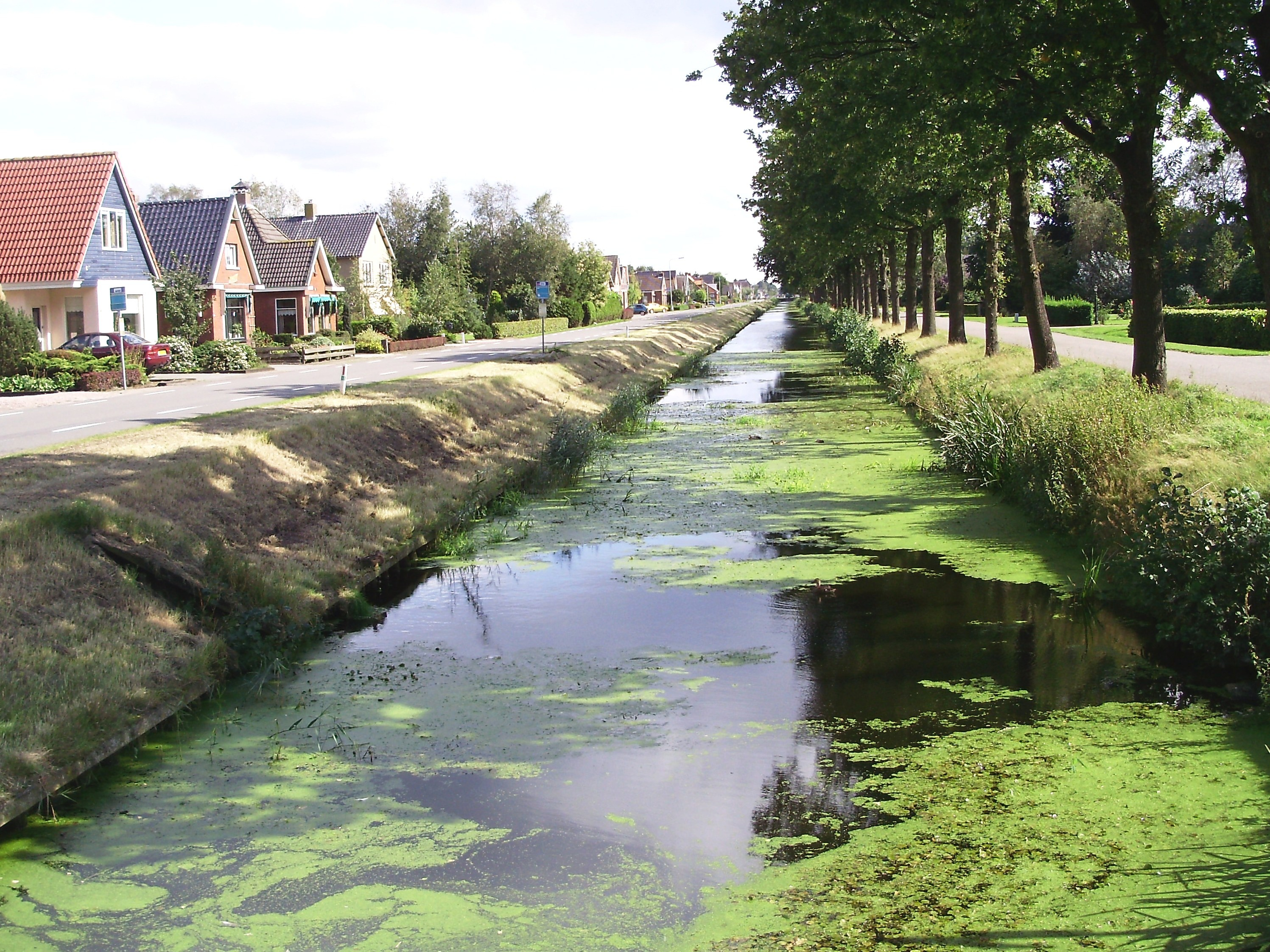
Canal view

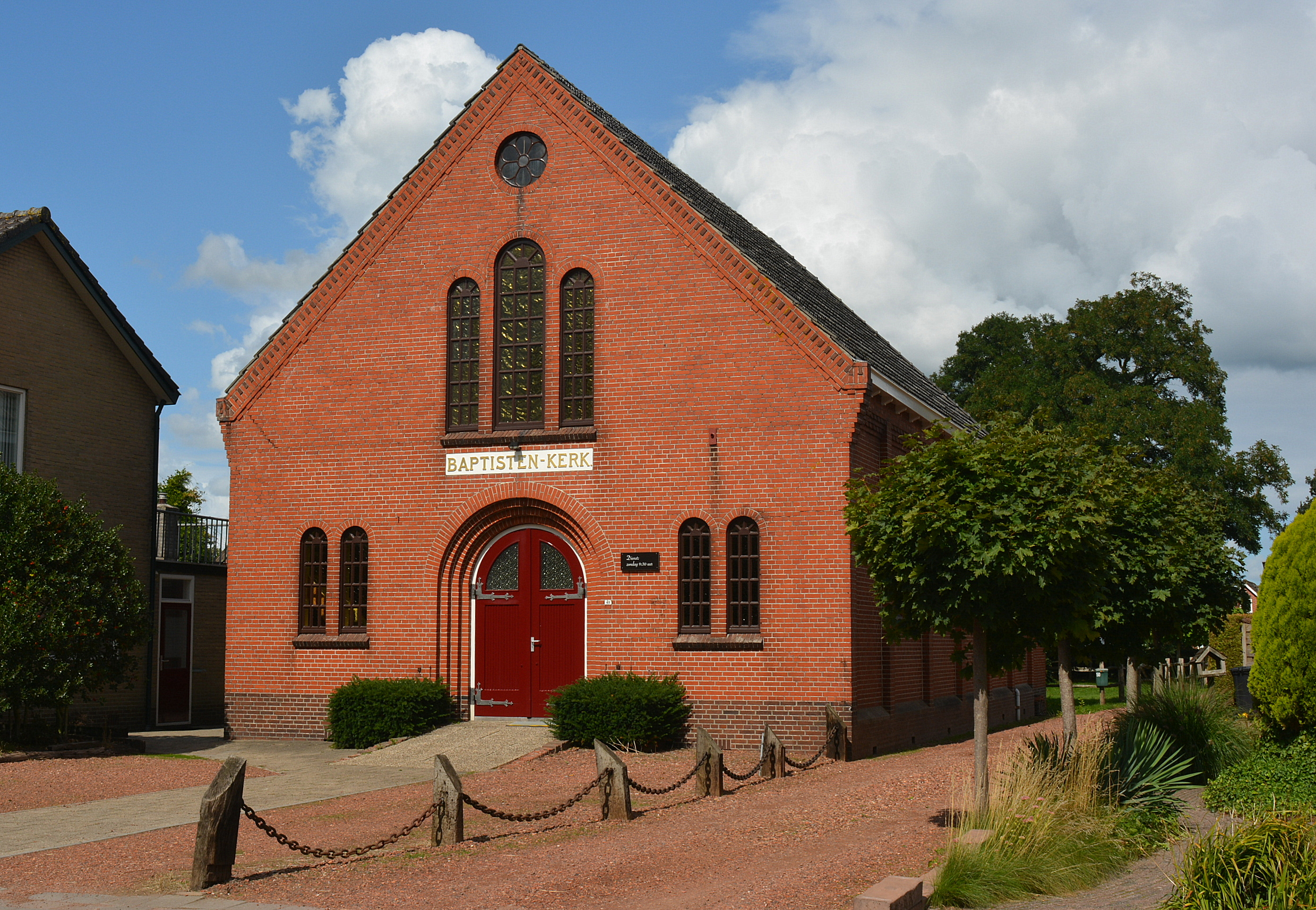
Mennonite Church
