= Ooststellingwerf =

Ooststellingwerf Ooststellingwarf (Stellingwerfs)
- Municipality
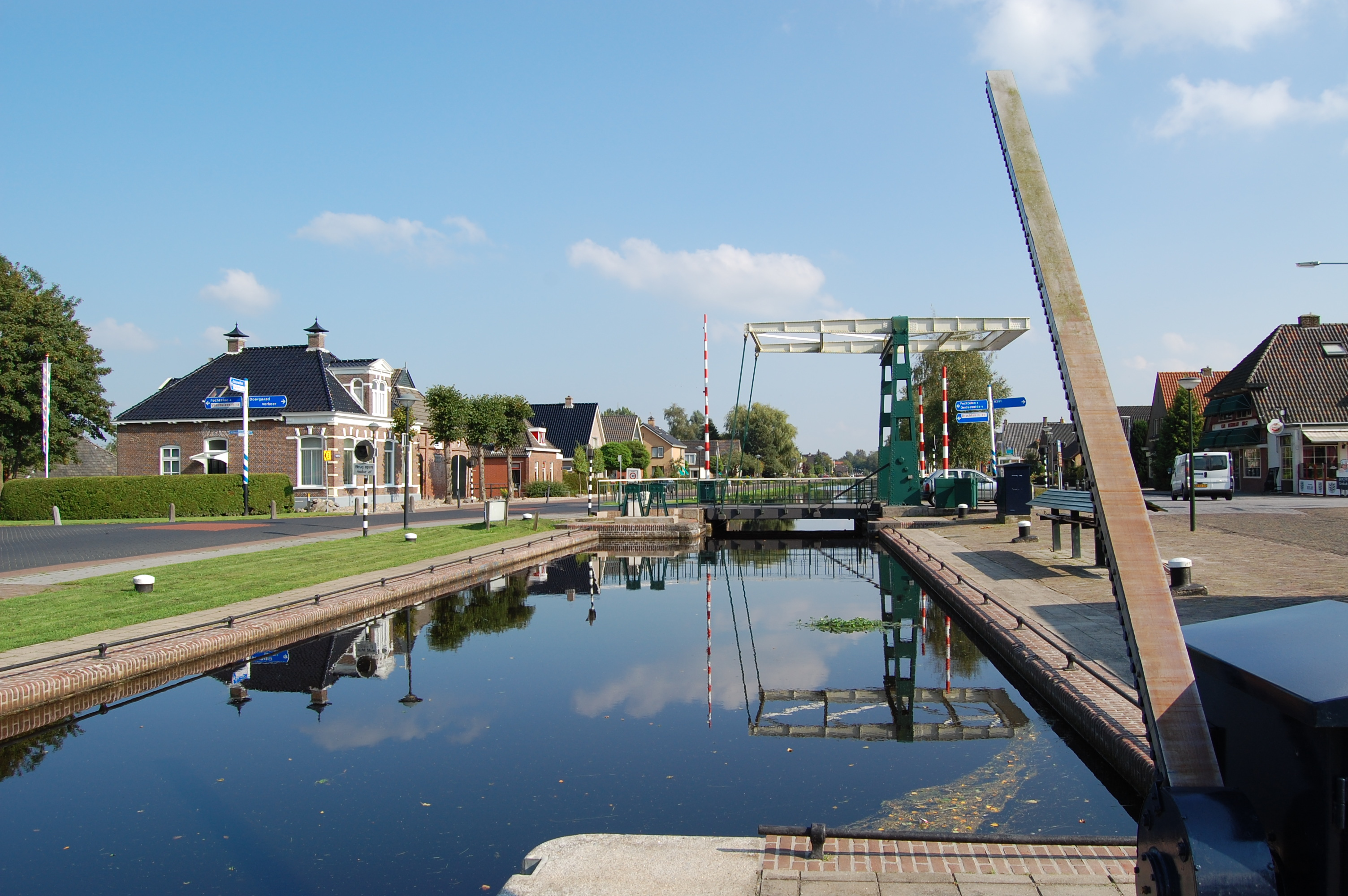
- Lock in canal through Appelscha

- Flag Coat of arms

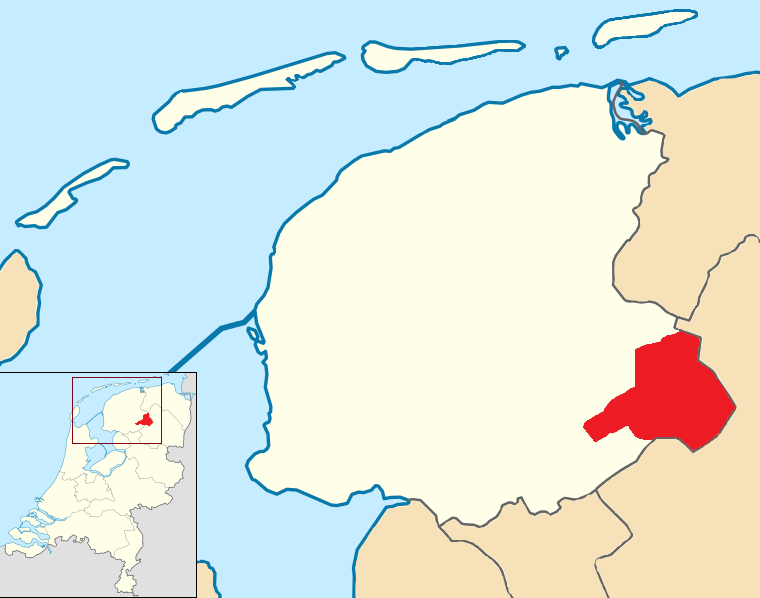
- Location in Friesland
- Coordinates: 53°0′N 6°18′E
- Country: Netherlands
- Province: Friesland

Government
  - Body: Municipal council
  - Mayor: Jack Werkman (VVD)

Area
  - Total: 226.11 km^{2} (87.30 sq mi)
  - Land: 223.42 km^{2} (86.26 sq mi)
  - Water: 2.69 km^{2} (1.04 sq mi)
- Elevation: 7 m (23 ft)

Population (January 2021)
  - Total: 25,464
  - Density: 114/km^{2} (300/sq mi)
- Time zone: UTC+1 (CET)
  - Summer (DST): UTC+2 (CEST)
- Postcode: 8420–8435
- Area code: 0516
- Website: www.ooststellingwerf.nl

Ooststellingwerf (Dutch: [ˈoːststɛlɪŋˌʋɛr(ə)f]; Stellingwarfs: Ooststellingwarf) is a municipality in the province of Friesland in the northern Netherlands. It is one of the municipalities of Friesland where Stellingwerfs, a dialect of Dutch Low Saxon, is spoken rather than West Frisian.

== Population centres ==
- Appelscha
- Donkerbroek
- Elsloo
- Fochteloo
- Haule
- Haulerwijk
- Langedijke
- Makkinga
- Nijeberkoop
- Oldeberkoop
- Oosterwolde
- Ravenswoud
- Waskemeer

=== Hamlets ===
The hamlets within the municipality are: 't Hoogezand, Aekinga, Bekhof, Bentemaden, Boekhorst, Bovenveld, Bûterheideveld, Buttinga, Canada, De Bult, De Knolle, De Koelanden, De Monden (partially), De Riete, Deddingabuurt, Drie Tolhekken, Elleboog, Egypte, Frankrijk, Hoogeduurswoude, Janssenstichting, Jardinga, Konijnenbuurt, Koudenburg, Klazinga, Laagduurswoude, Medhuizen, Moskou (partially), Nanninga, Nieuwe Vaart, Oude Willem (partially), Petersburg (partially), Prandinga, Rolpaal, Schottelenburg, Schrappinga, Terwisscha, Tronde, Twijtel, Veneburen, Venekoten, Weper, Weperpolder, Willemstad, Zuid (partially) and Zuidhorn.

=== Topography ===
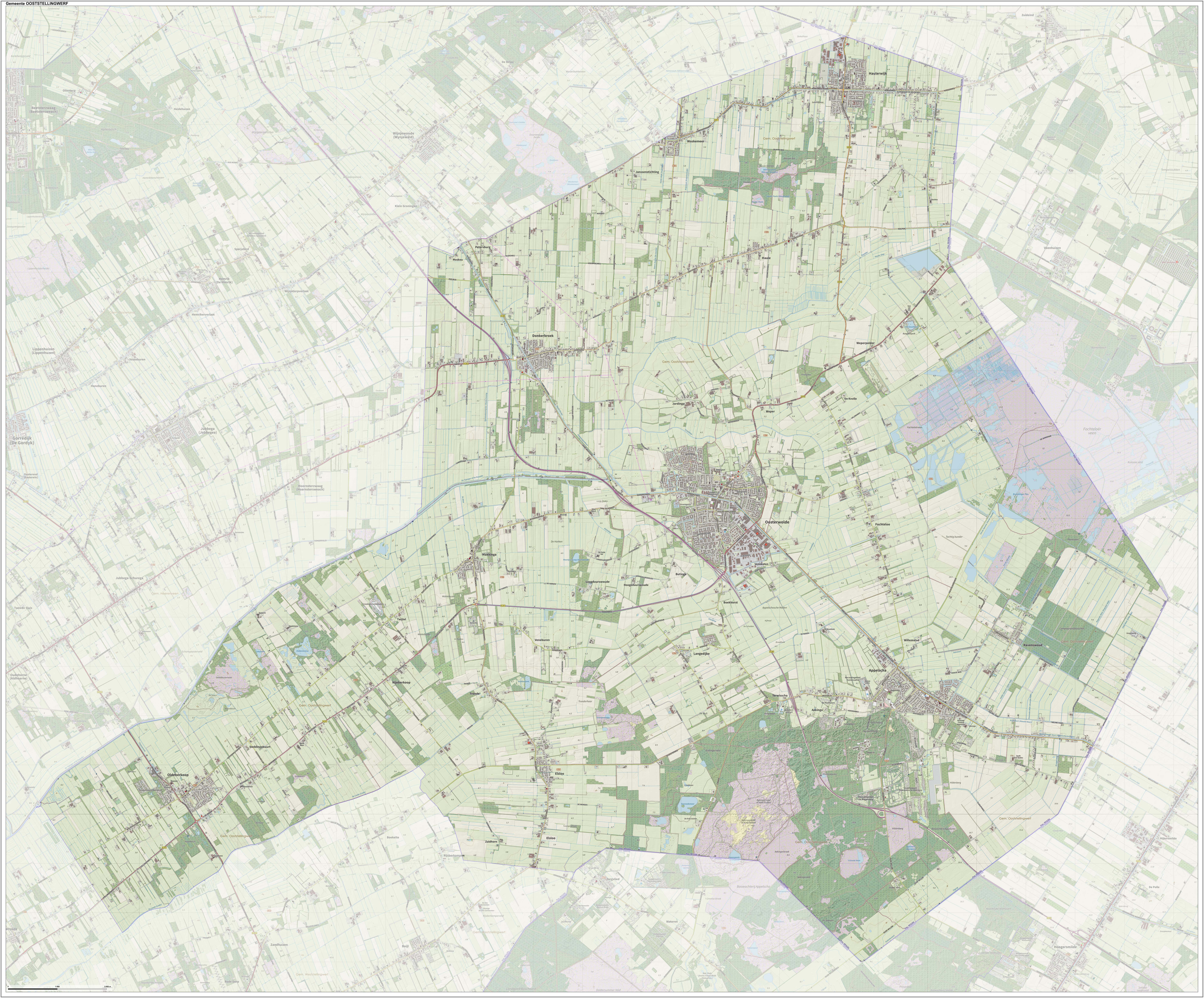
Map of the municipality of Ooststellingwerf, September 2023

== Notable people ==
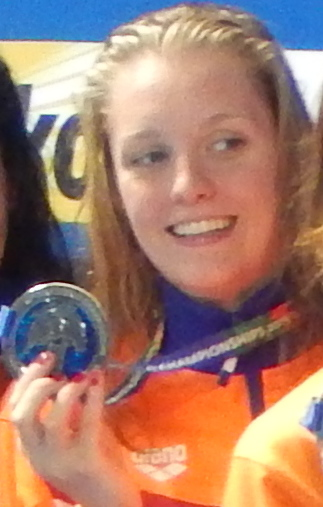
Marrit Steenbergen, 2015

- Anne Vondeling (1916 in Appelscha – 1979) a Dutch politician
- Prof Dirk ter Haar FRSE FIP (1919 in Oosterwolde – 2002) an Anglo-Dutch physicist
- Piet Bergveld (born 1940 in Oosterwolde) a Dutch emeritus professor of biosensors, invented ISFET

=== Sport ===
- Joop Alberda (born 1952 in Oosterwolde) a retired volleyball coach
- Halbe Zijlstra (born 1969 in Oosterwolde) a retired Dutch politician
- Jan Kromkamp (born 1980 in Makkinga) a Dutch retired footballer with 316 club caps
- Jan Eise Kromkamp (born 1955 in Fochteloo) a Dutch retired speed skater and inline skater
- Sjoerd Hamburger (born 1983 in Oldeberkoop) a rower who competes in the single scull, competed in the 2008 and 2012 Summer Olympics
- Marrit Steenbergen (born 2000 in Ooststellingwerf) a Dutch competitive swimmer, gold medallist at the 2015 European Games
