= Nina Baanders-Kessler =

Dutch sculptor and medalist

Antje Baanders-Kessler
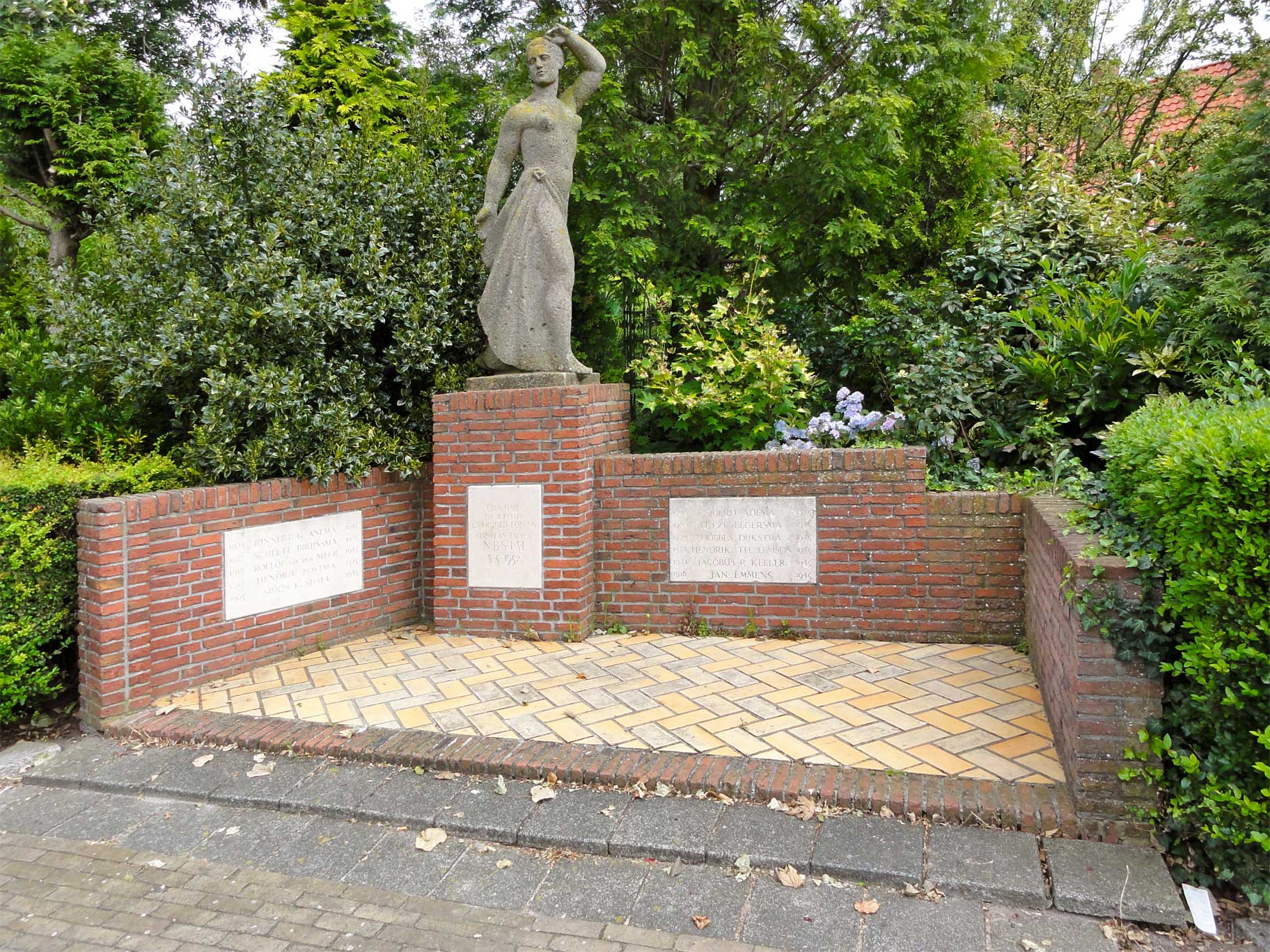
- Resistance Memorial in Makkum
- Born: Antje Baanders; 28 February 1915; Leeuwarden
- Died: 20 June 2002 (aged 87)
- Known for: Sculpture

Nina Baanders-Kessler (Leeuwarden, 28 February 1915 – 20 June 2002) was a Dutch sculptor and medalist.

== Life and work ==
Nina Baanders-Kessler was born to Jacob Kessler, butcher in Leeuwarden, and Elizabeth Anna Axe. She was named after her grandmother Kessler-Antje van der Berg, however, she called herself Nina.

In 1934, Nina Kessler admitted to the Royal Academy of Fine Arts, where she studied sculpture in the daytime with Jan Bronner. After her studies she made a trip to Paris and Vienna and settled back in Leeuwarden, where she had her own studio in the Eebuurt neighbourhood. She was the first Frisian sculptor, only twenty years later settled among others Maria van Everdingen and Suze Berkhout Boschma in Friesland. She married in 1942 with Ambrose Baanders, and first lived in Leeuwarden, and later in Vinkeveen.

== Works (selection) ==
- 1940. Weapon stone for City Hall in Koudum
- 1940. Weapon stone for Wirdumerpoortsbrug, Leeuwarden
- 1947. Plaque of Theo van Welderen Rengers, Oenkerk
- 1948. Tableau for head of school A.J. Lok, Ravenswoud
- 1952. Resistance Memorial (female figure), Makkum
- 1964. Bust of Johan Bendien, Amsterdam
