= Ravenswoud =

- Village
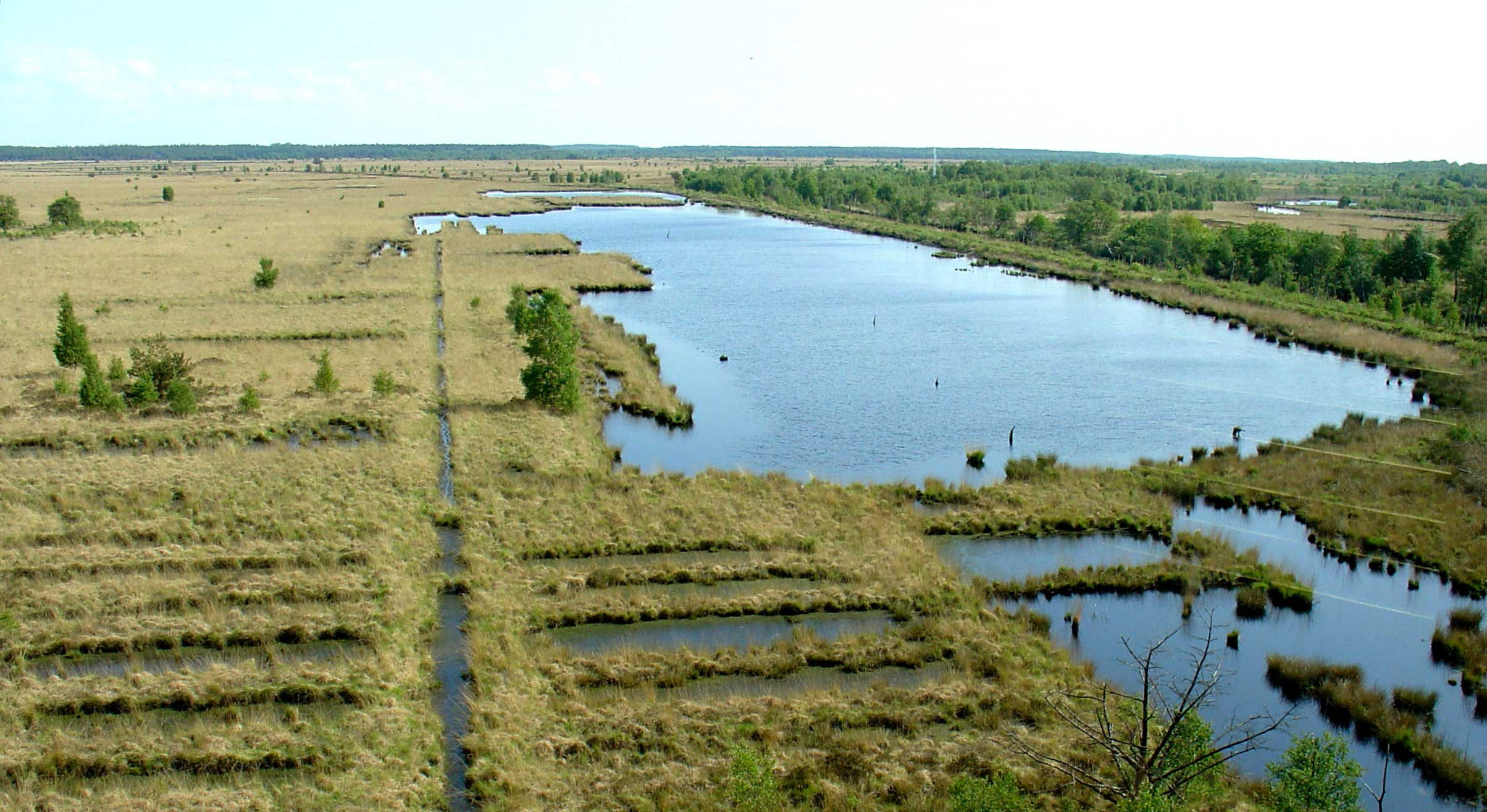
- View over Fochteloërveen from the watchtower near Ravenswoud

- Flag

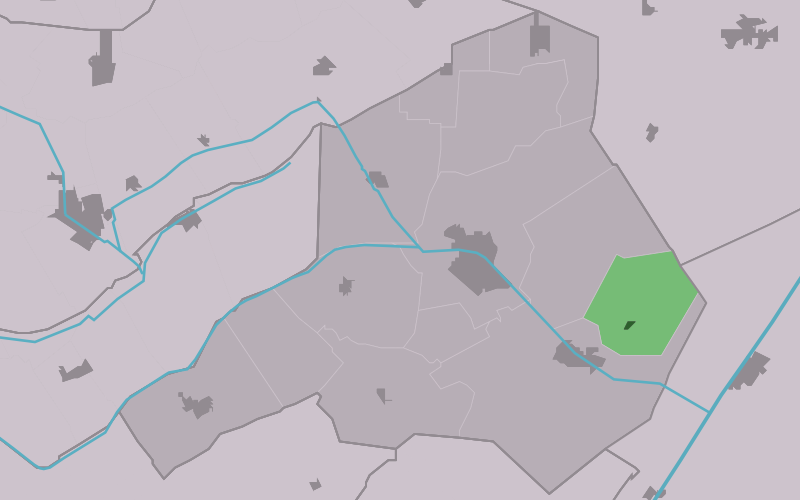
- Location in Ooststellingwerf municipality

- Location in the Netherlands Ravenswoud (Netherlands)
- Country: Netherlands
- Province: Friesland
- Municipality: Ooststellingwerf

Area
  - Total: 12.97 km^{2} (5.01 sq mi)
- Elevation: 10 m (33 ft)

Population (2021)
  - Total: 405
  - Density: 31.2/km^{2} (80.9/sq mi)
- Time zone: UTC+1 (CET)
  - Summer (DST): UTC+2 (CEST)
- Postal code: 8427
- Dialing code: 0516
- Website: Official website

Ravenswoud (West Frisian: Ravenswâld) is a village consisting of about 400 inhabitants in the municipality of Ooststellingwerf in the east of Friesland, the Netherlands.

== History ==
Ravenswoud was founded as a peat-cutter settlement in 1850. Having this origin, the owners of the peat-rich earth hired workers to undo the soil of peat. In 1871 the first house was built and the first petition for a school came in 1881. After the first world war the population increased due to the building of houses by the local housing association. By relocating typically a-social families to here, the village got a bad reputation. Their decrepit houses were demolished around 1949 and the land was sold to the government or private buyers.

A memorable moment was known with the progression of the second world war. In the war waged village, Jewish refugees were actively hidden in the town's school attic. The school principal stimulated this and supplied the refugees with food and water. As it was found out, the principal and the Jewish refugees were executed instantly. This act of resistance has been commemorated by renaming the street he lived in and the school he taught.

== Geography ==
There is a nature reserve located between Fochteloo, Ravenswoud and Veenhuizen, called Fochteloërveen. It is one of the best preserved highland areas in the Netherlands.

== Gallery ==
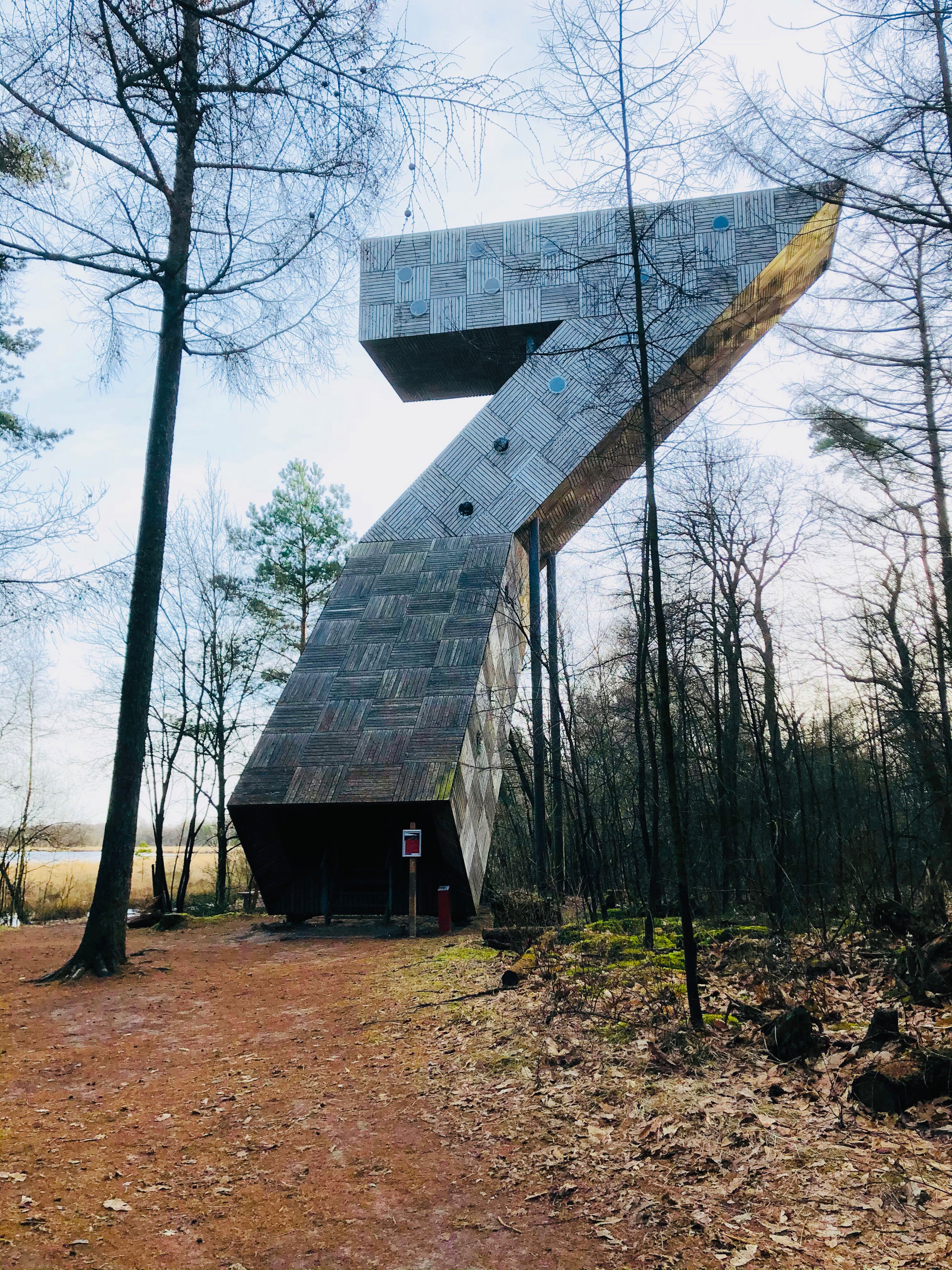
Observation tower "7"

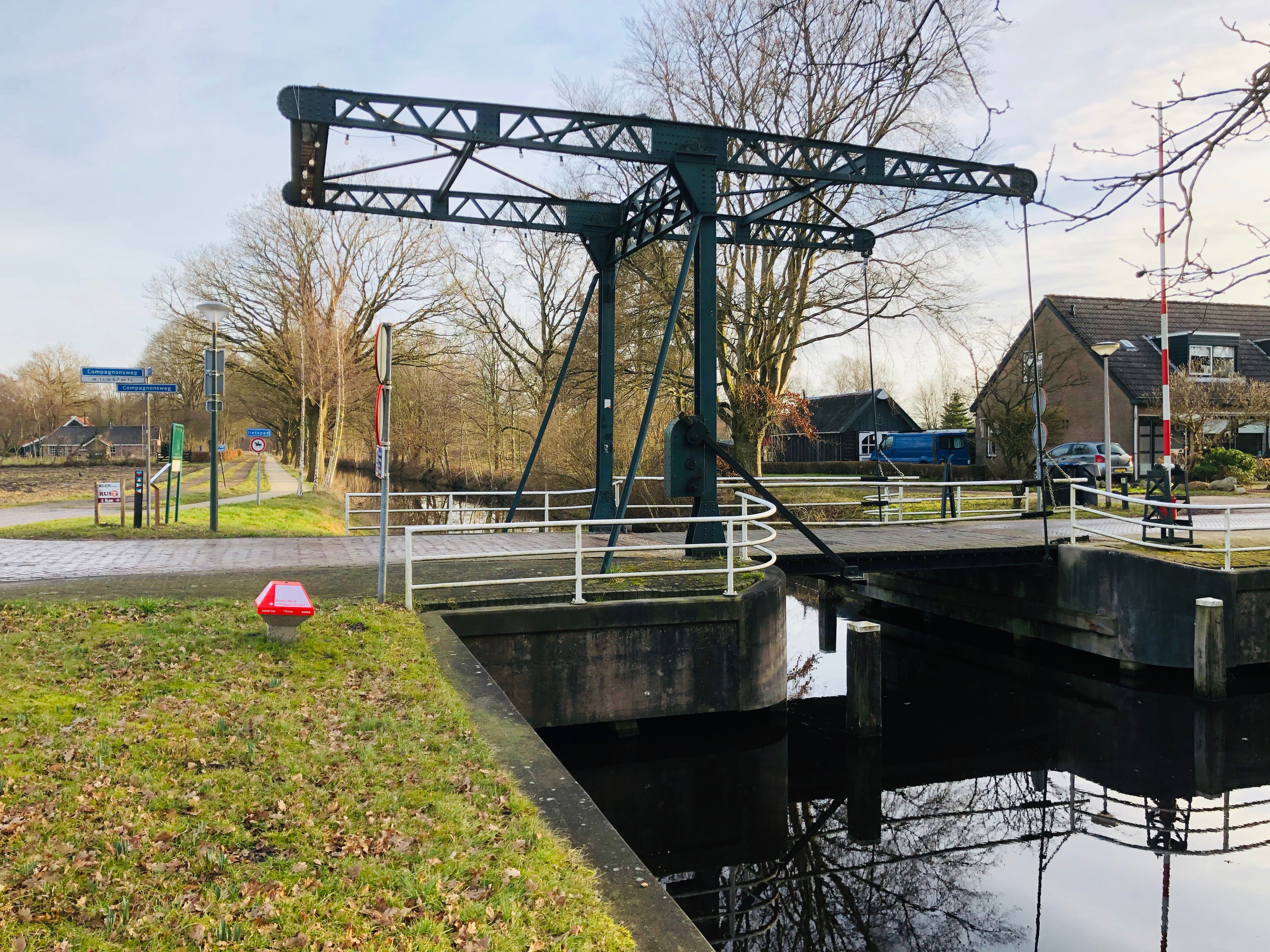
Bridge in Ravenswoud

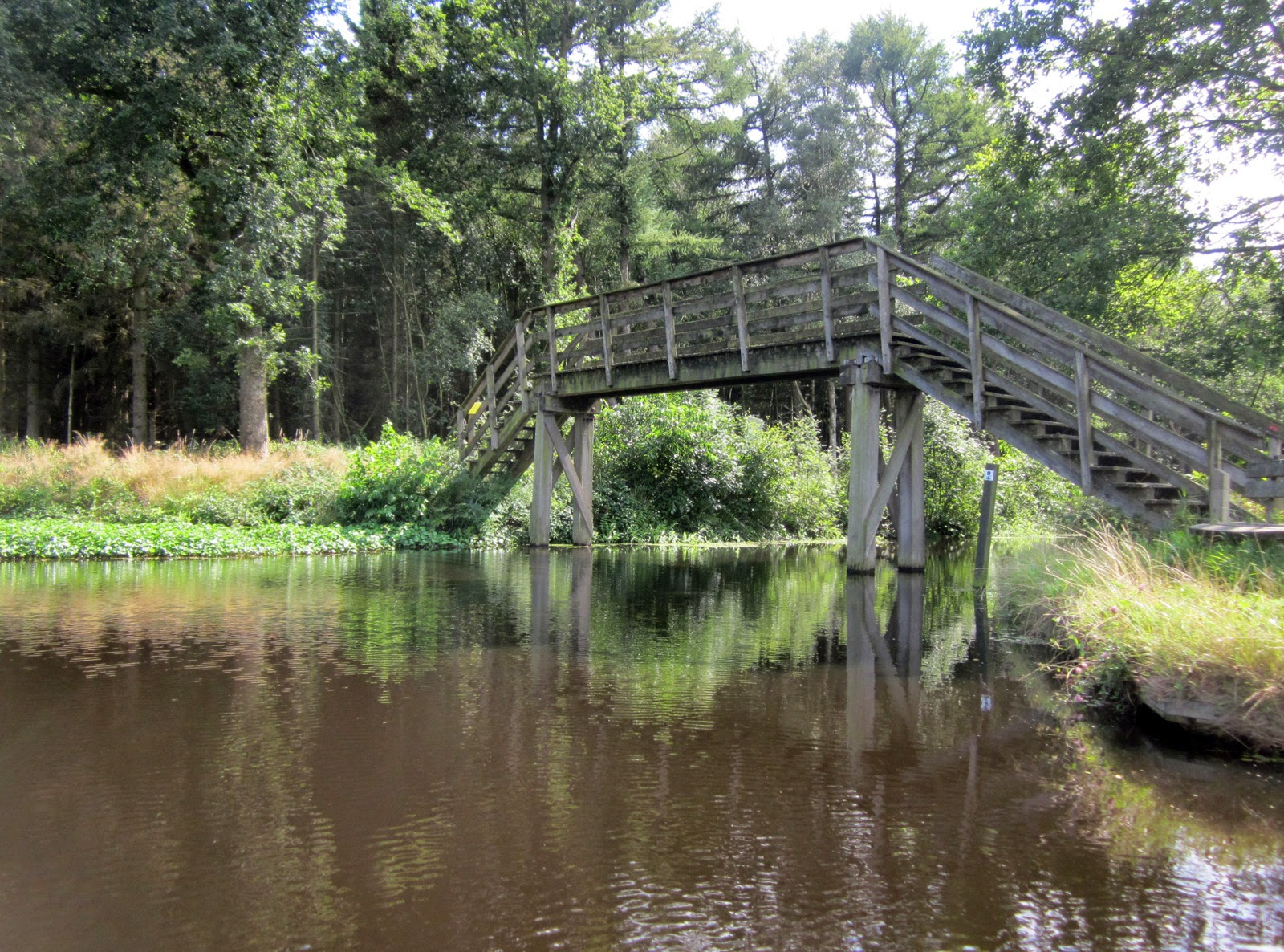
Campagnonsbos
