= Donkerbroek =

- Village
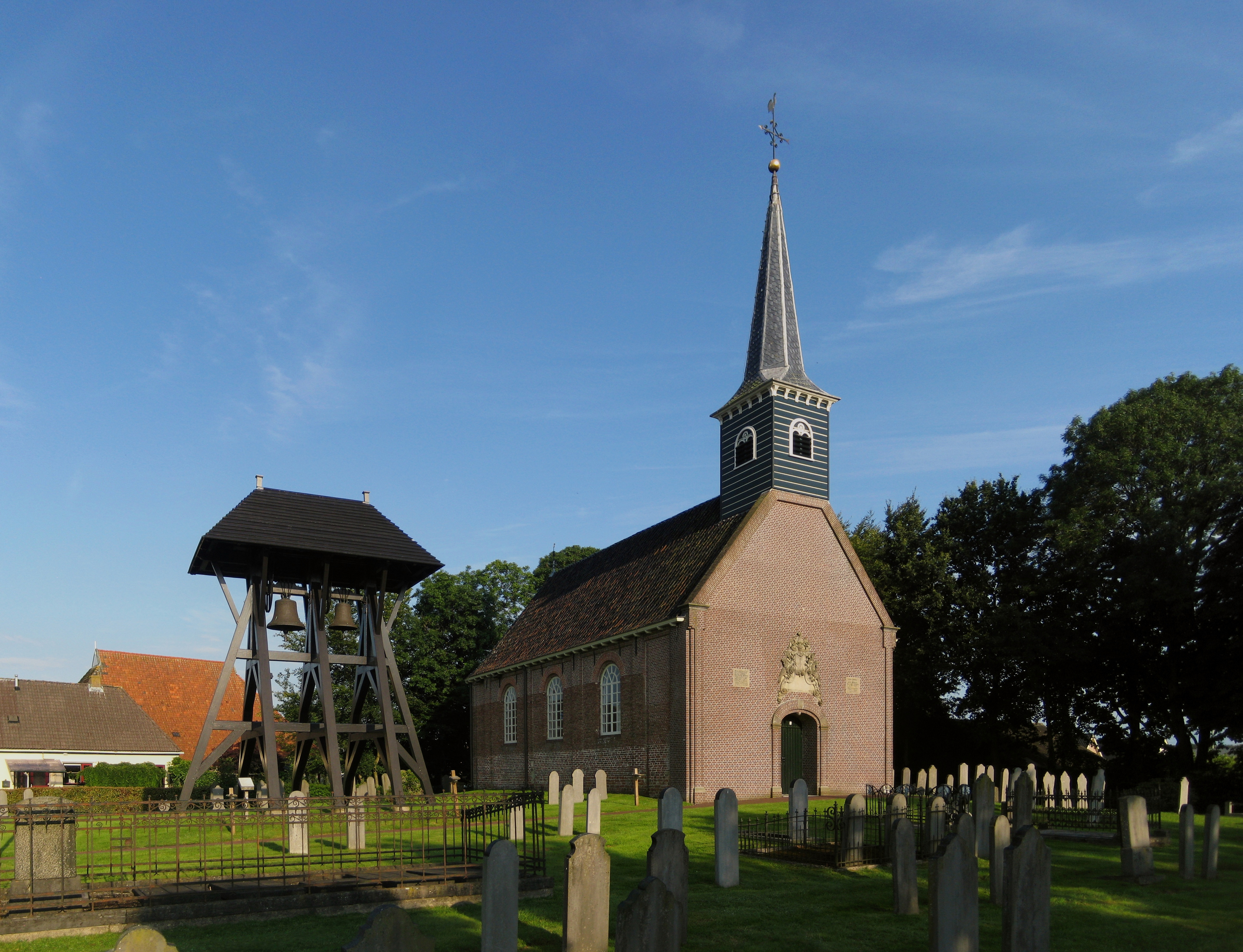
- Donkerbroek Church

- Flag Coat of arms

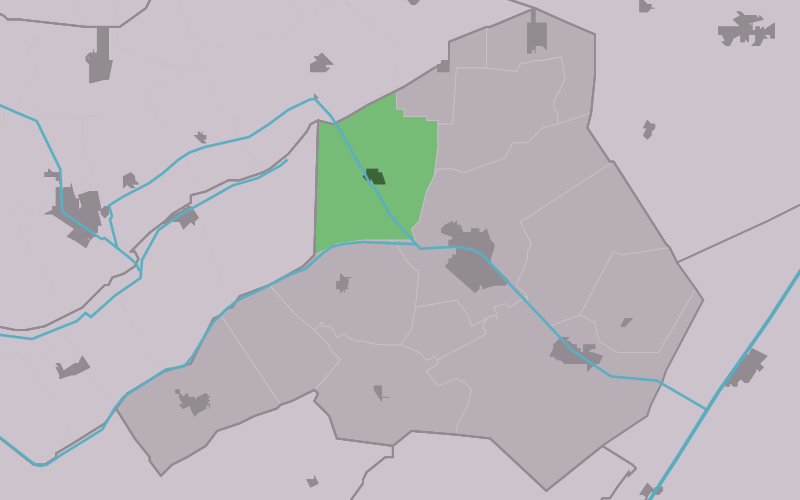
- Location in Ooststellingwerf municipality

- Location in the Netherlands Donkerbroek (Netherlands)
- Country: Netherlands
- Province: Friesland
- Municipality: Ooststellingwerf

Area
  - Total: 22.31 km^{2} (8.61 sq mi)
- Elevation: 5 m (16 ft)

Population (2021)
  - Total: 1,895
  - Density: 84.94/km^{2} (220.0/sq mi)
- Time zone: UTC+1 (CET)
  - Summer (DST): UTC+2 (CEST)
- Postal code: 8435
- Dialing code: 0516

Donkerbroek is a village in the municipality of Ooststellingwerf, the Netherlands. In 2017, it had a population of around 1,830.

== History ==
The village was first mentioned in 1408 as Duncbrueck. The etymology is unclear. Donkerbroek probably developed in the 13th century along the Heerenveen to Assen road. Even though, it is located in a peat region, it is not an excavation village. The Dutch Reformed church was built in 1714 as a replacement of an older church. The church has a standalone belfry with two bells which have existed since at least 1723. In 1840, Donkerbroek was home to 669 people.

Around 1900, some industry appeared along the canal. The cooperative purchasing association "Friesland" is an industrial complex from 1911 which is built in a combination of Rationalism and Jugendstil. The building contained a fodder factory.

== Gallery ==
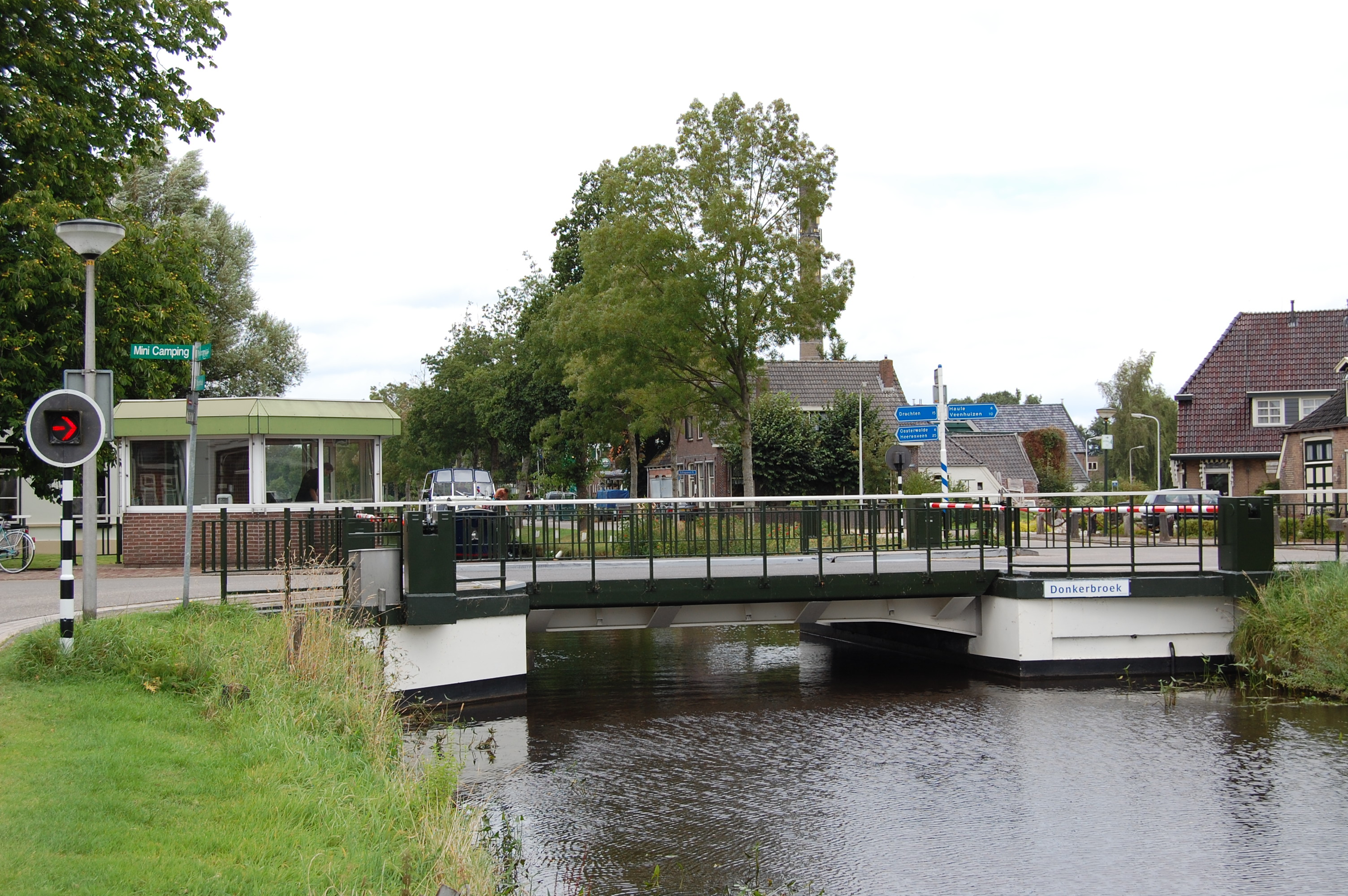
Bridge in Donkerbroek

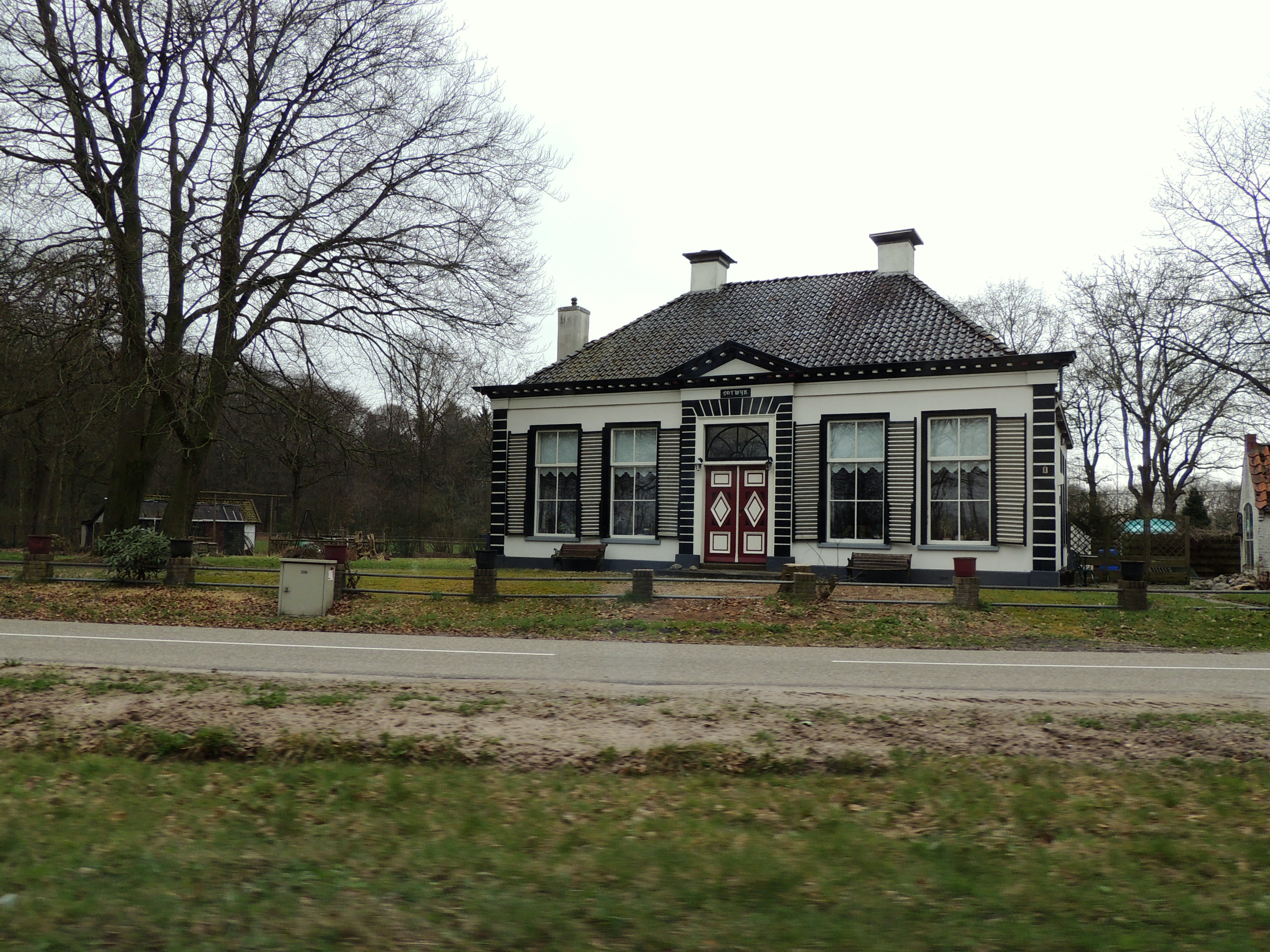
Huis Ontwijk

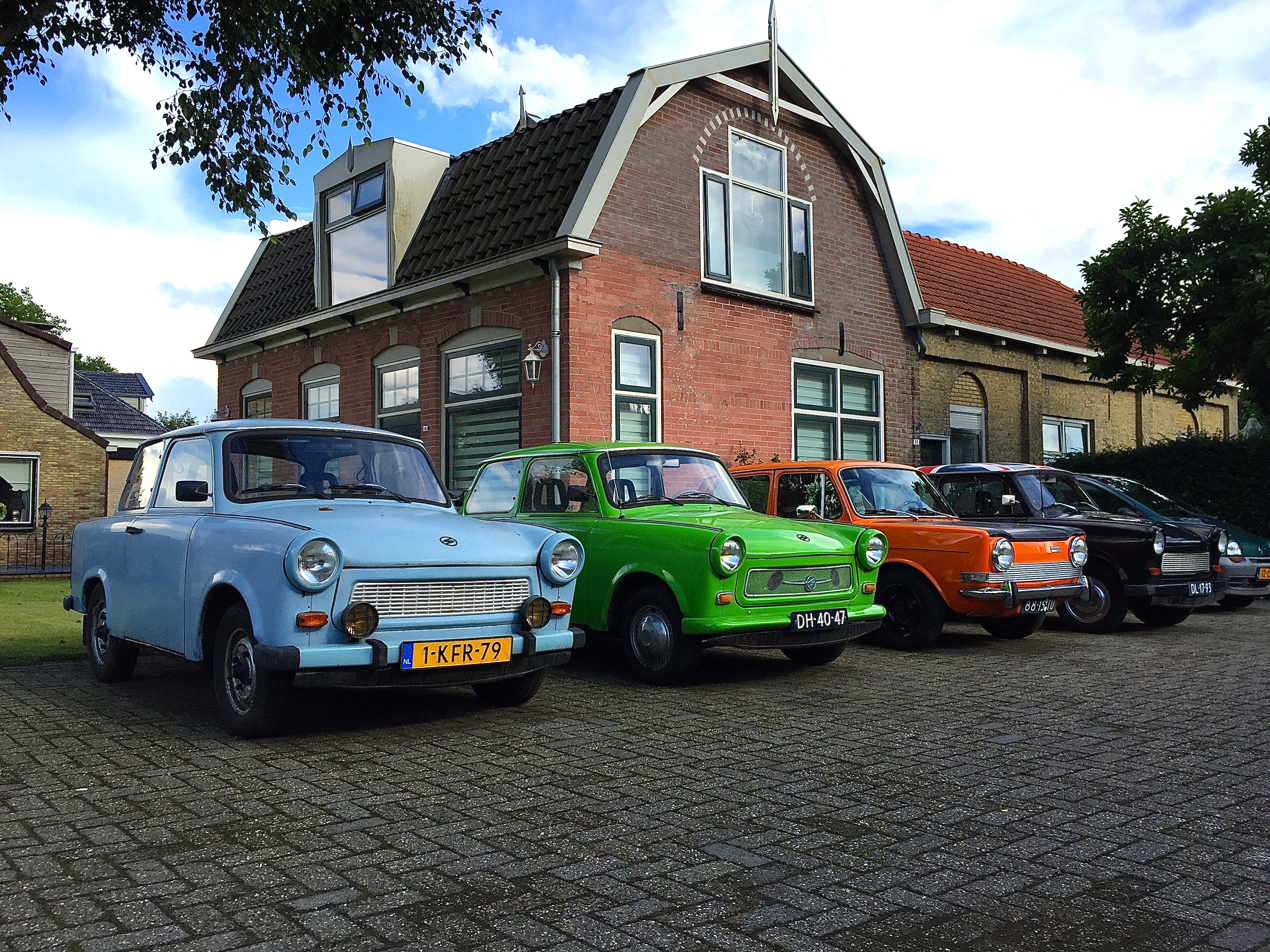
Trabants and Simcas in Donkerbroek

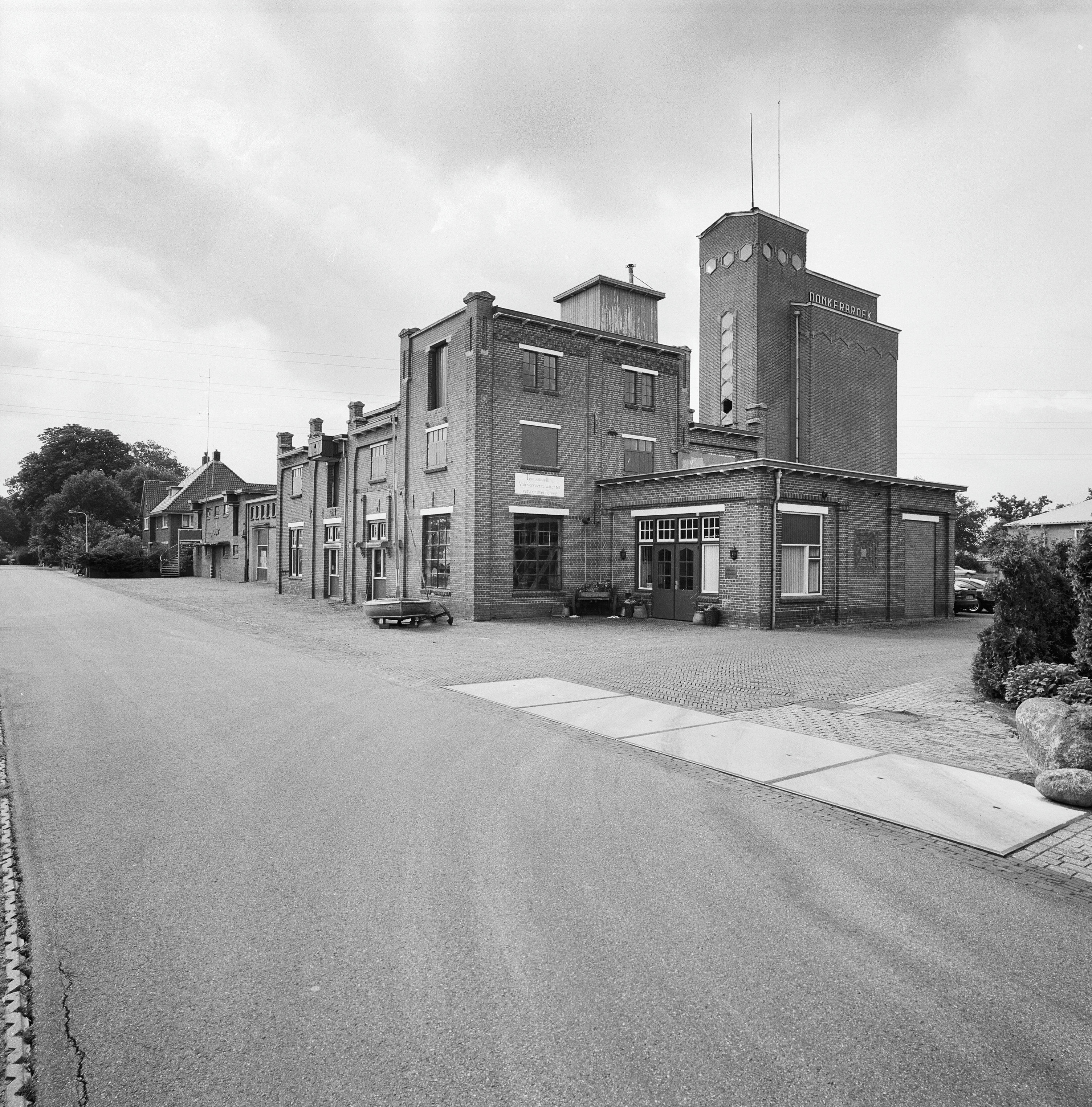
Complex of "Friesland"
