= Langedijke =

Langedijke Langedike (West Frisian)
- Village
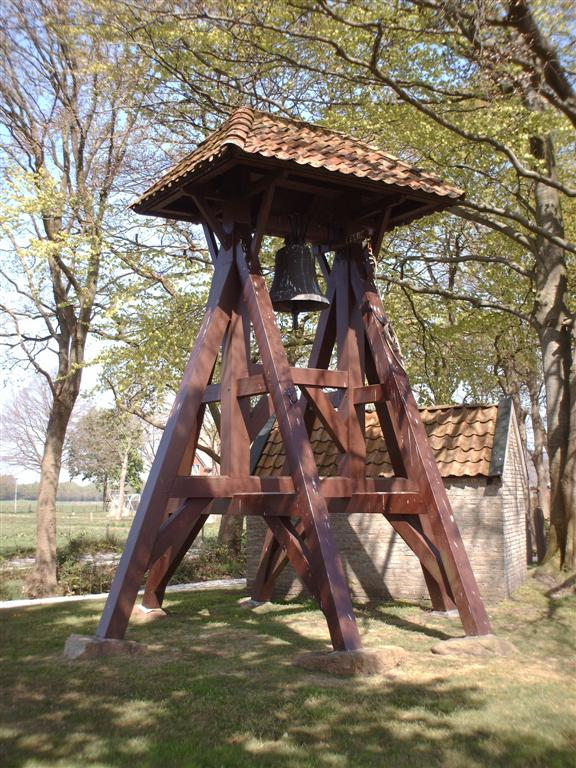

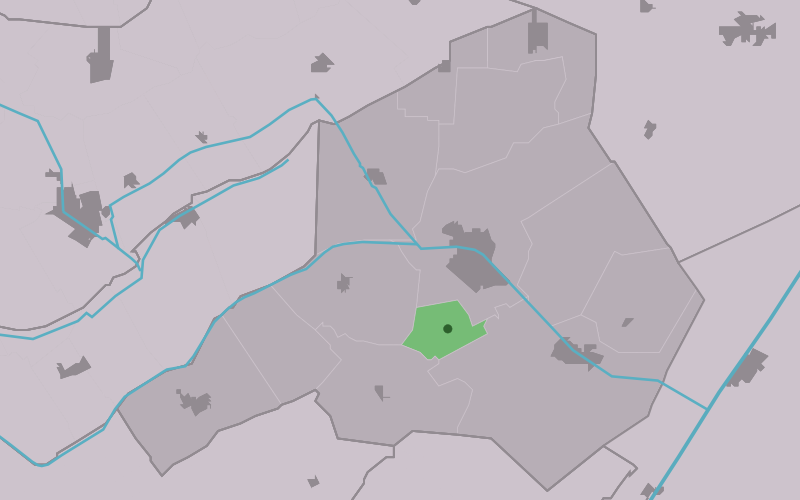
- Location in Ooststellingwerf municipality

- Location in the Netherlands Langedijke (Netherlands)
- Country: Netherlands
- Province: Friesland
- Municipality: Ooststellingwerf

Area
  - Total: 4.76 km^{2} (1.84 sq mi)
- Elevation: 5 m (16 ft)

Population (2021)
  - Total: 320
  - Density: 67/km^{2} (170/sq mi)
- Time zone: UTC+1 (CET)
  - Summer (DST): UTC+2 (CEST)
- Postal code: 8425
- Dialing code: 0516

Langedijke (West Frisian: Langedike) is a village consisting of about 290 inhabitants in the municipality of Ooststellingwerf in 2017 in the east of Friesland, the Netherlands.

The village was first mentioned in 1408 as Langedijc, and means "long dike". The church was demolished in 1830, and only a bell tower remained. The bell dates from 1300 and is one of the oldest bells of Frieslands.

In 1840, Langedijke was home to 36 people.

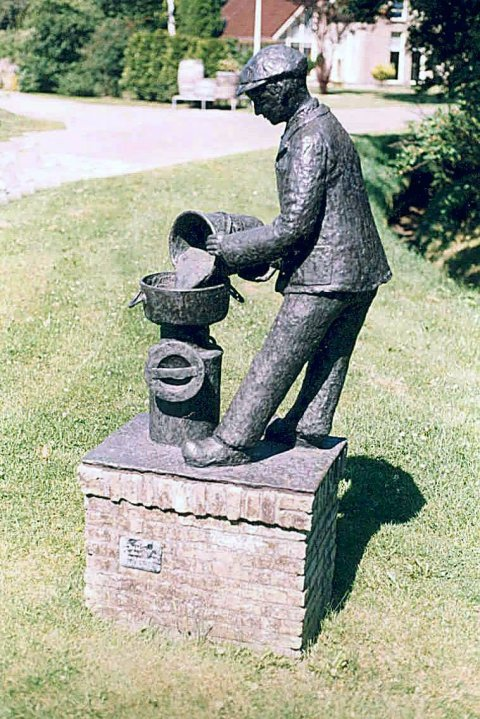
Statue "The Milker"
