= Oude Willem =

- Hamlet
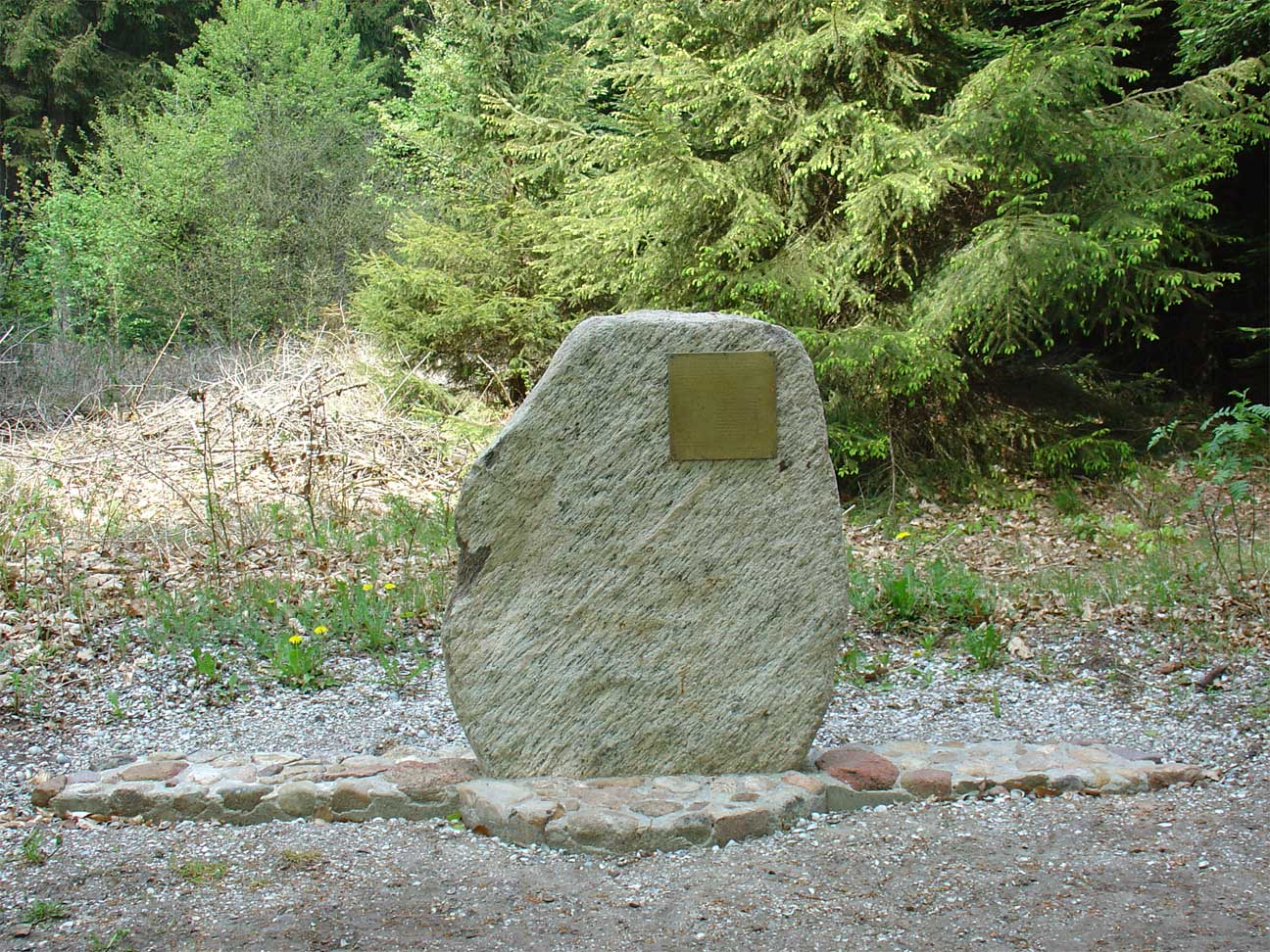
- Memorial Halifax crash

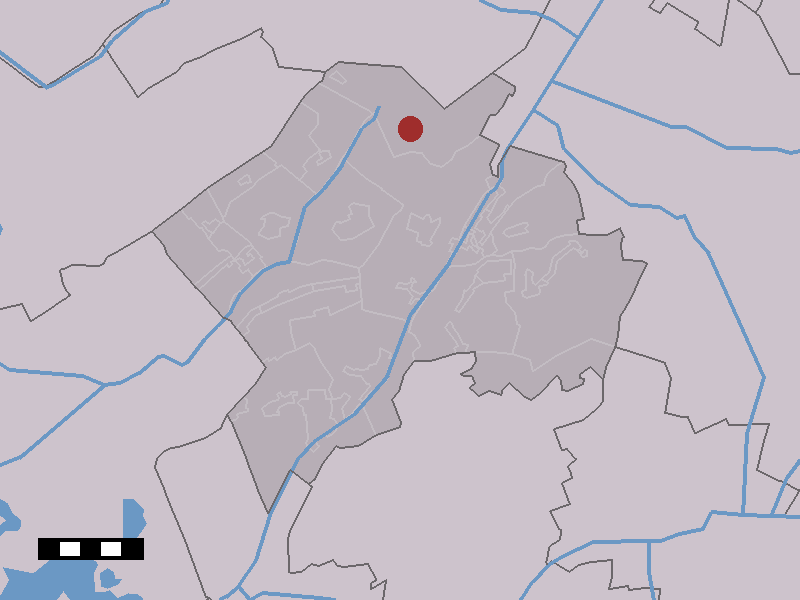
- Oude Willem in the municipality of Westerveld.

- Location in the province of Drenthe Oude Willem (Netherlands)
- Coordinates: 52°53′33″N 6°18′35″E
- Country: Netherlands
- Province: Drenthe
- Province: Friesland
- Municipality: Westerveld
- Municipality: Ooststellingwerf
- Time zone: UTC+1 (CET)
  - Summer (DST): UTC+2 (CEST)
- Postal code: 8439
- Dialing code: 0521

Oude Willem (Low Saxon: Olde Willem) is a hamlet in the Dutch provinces of Drenthe and Friesland. It lays within the municipalities of Westerveld and Ooststellingwerf. Oude Willem lies about 21 km southwest of Assen.

Oude Willem (Old William) is named a 19th century shepherd who used the heath for grazing. There are about 15 houses on the Frisian side, and 10 on the Drenthe side.

There is a monument for the crew of the bomber Halifax B11. W231 who were shot down on 22 November 1943, and crashed in Oude Willem.
