= Waskemeer =

Waskemeer Waskemar
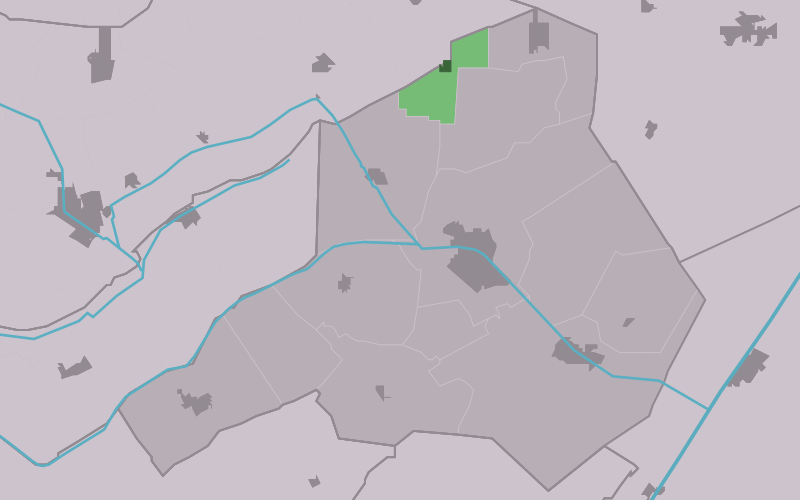
- Location in Ooststellingwerf municipality

- Location in the Netherlands Waskemeer (Netherlands)
- Coordinates: 53.0554°N 6.2794°E
- Country: Netherlands
- Province: Friesland
- Municipality: Ooststellingwerf

Area
  - Total: 5.78 km^{2} (2.23 sq mi)
- Elevation: 6 m (20 ft)

Population (2021)
  - Total: 835
  - Density: 144/km^{2} (374/sq mi)
- Time zone: UTC+1 (CET)
  - Summer (DST): UTC+2 (CEST)
- Postal code: 8434
- Dialing code: 0516
- Website: Official website

Waskemeer (West Frisian: Waskemar) is a village in the municipality of Ooststellingwerf in the east of Friesland, the Netherlands.

== History ==
The village was first mentioned in 1718 Gr. Waske Meer. The etymology is unclear. Waskemeer started as a peat excavation village after the Haulerwijkstervaart was dug in 1756 by the Drachters Company.

== Football ==
Waskemeer has a football team called Fuotbalferiening Waskemar. Its uniform is black and the shirt has a green horizontal band and white arm band. The trousers are black with green pin stripe, and green socks with black band.
