= Fochteloo =

Fochteloo De Fochtel
- Village
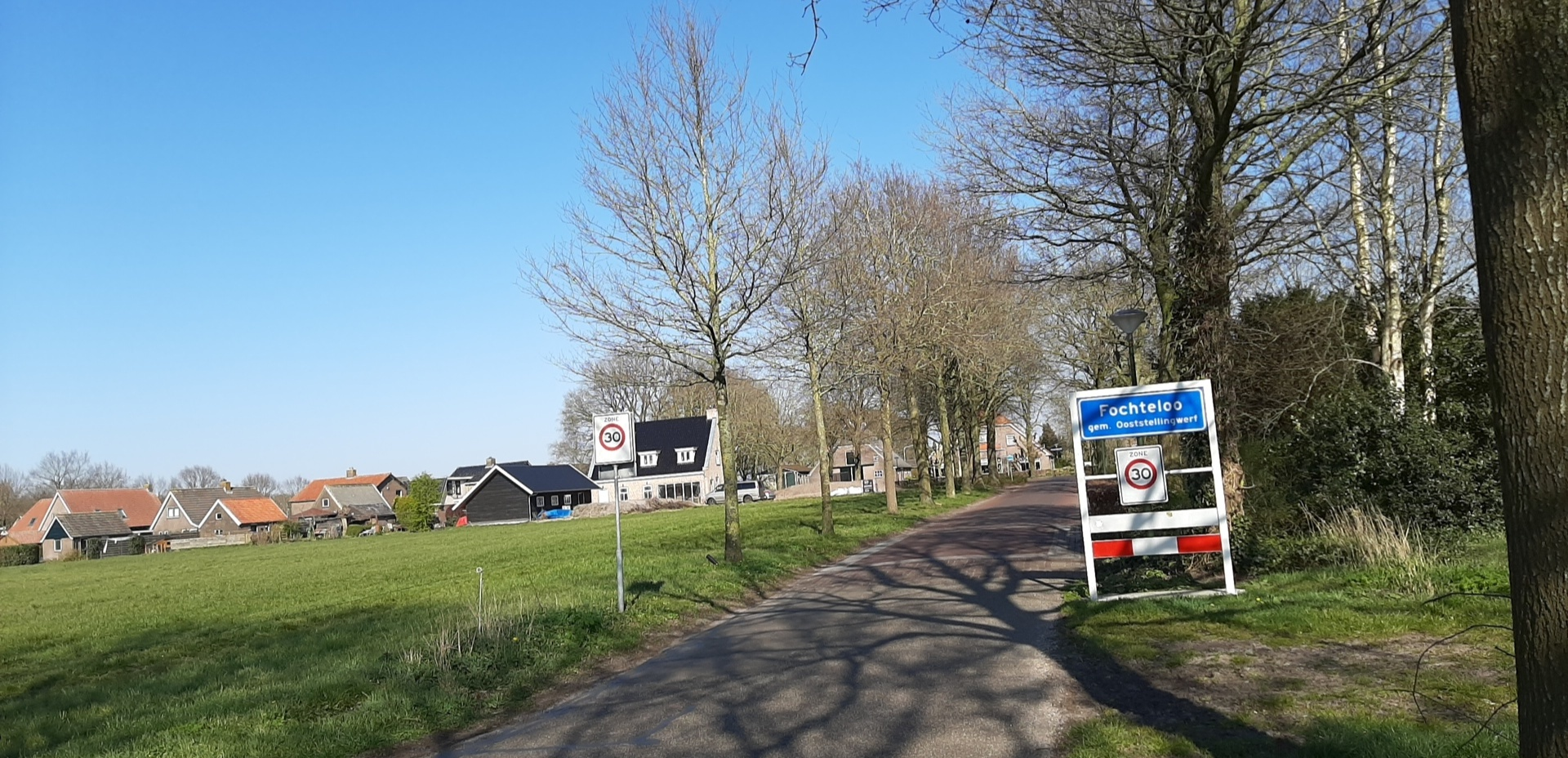
- Welcome to Fochteloo

- Flag

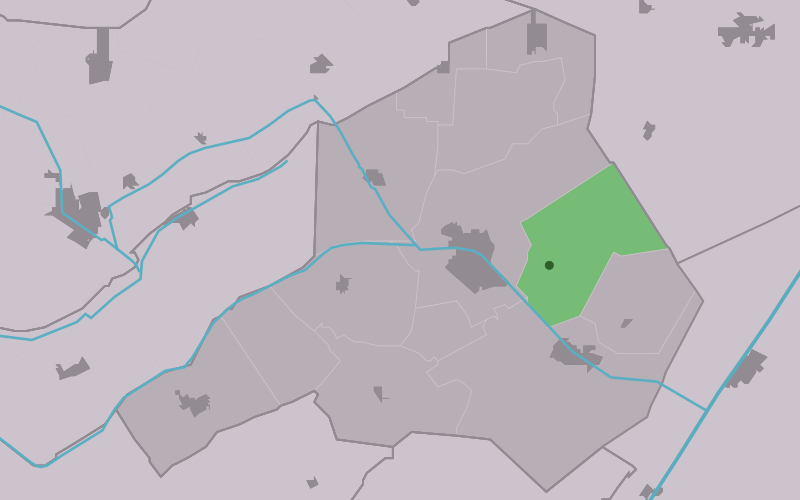
- Location in Ooststellingwerf municipality

- Location in the Netherlands Fochteloo (Netherlands)
- Coordinates: 52°59′33″N 6°20′5″E
- Country: Netherlands
- Province: Friesland
- Municipality: Ooststellingwerf

Area
  - Total: 19.77 km^{2} (7.63 sq mi)
- Elevation: 7 m (23 ft)

Population (2021)
  - Total: 350
  - Density: 18/km^{2} (46/sq mi)
- Time zone: UTC+1 (CET)
  - Summer (DST): UTC+2 (CEST)
- Postal code: 8428
- Dialing code: 0516

Fochteloo (West Frisian: De Fochtel) is a village with around 400 inhabitants in the municipality of Ooststellingwerf in southeastern Friesland in the Netherlands.

== History ==
The village was first mentioned in 1408 as Fyochtelo, and probably means moist forest. The church was demolished in 1832, but the bell tower with two bells has remained. From 1908 until 2008, there was a chapel in the dairy factory. In 1840, Fochteloo was home to 163 people.

In 1942, Camp Ybenheer was established as a Jewish forced labour camp. On Yom Kippur 1942 (2–3 October), all 215 labourers were moved to Westerbork transit camp from where they were transported to Auschwitz and Sobibor. After the war, the camp was used for South Moluccan refugees. In 2002, a memorial was placed at the former camp grounds.

== Geography ==
There is a nature reserve located between Fochteloo and Veenhuizen, called Fochteloërveen.

== Notable people ==
- Jan Eise Kromkamp (born 1955), speed skater and inline skater

== Gallery ==
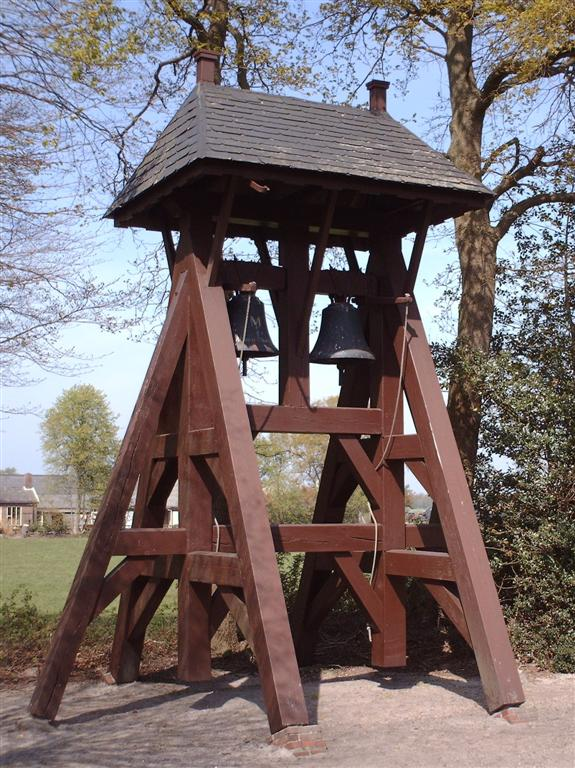
Bell tower of Fochteloo

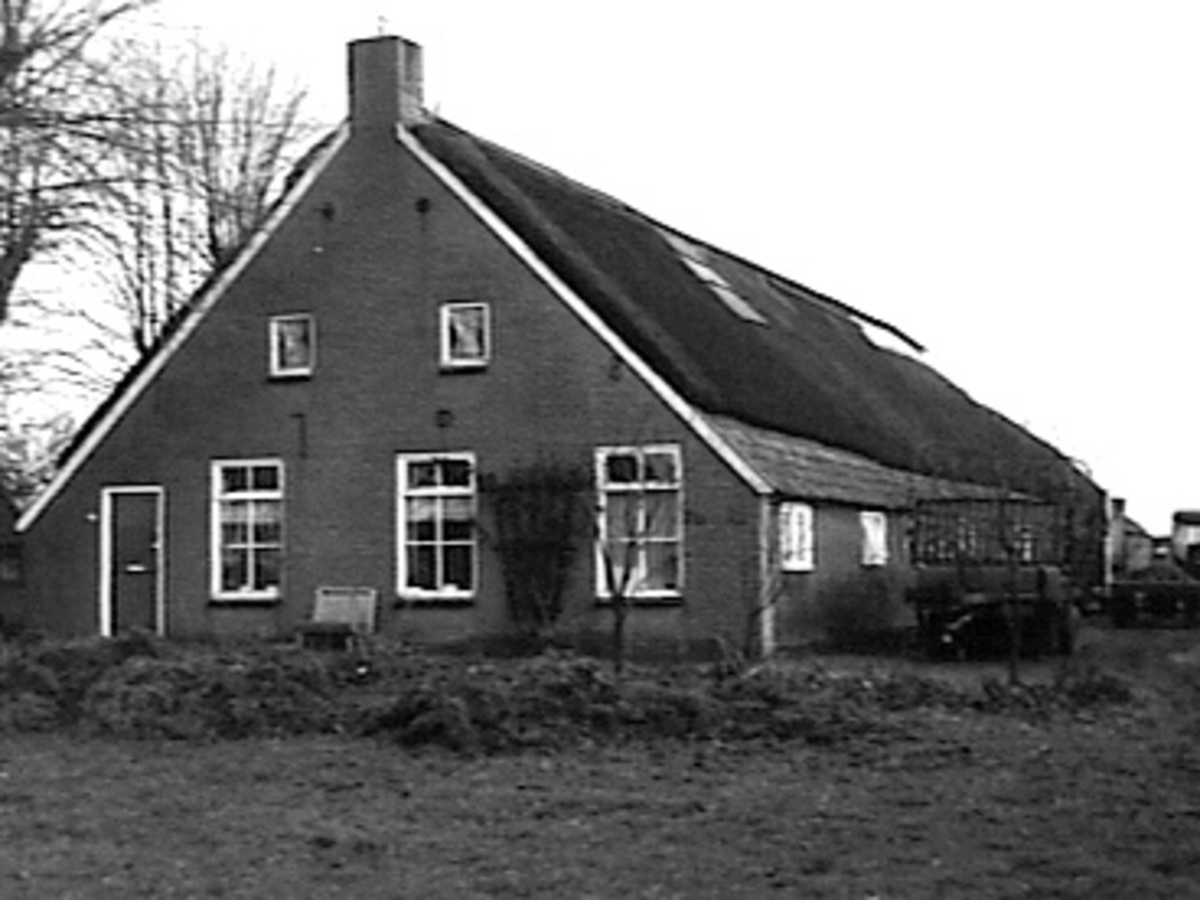
Farm in Fochteloo
