= Haule =

Haule De Haule
- Village
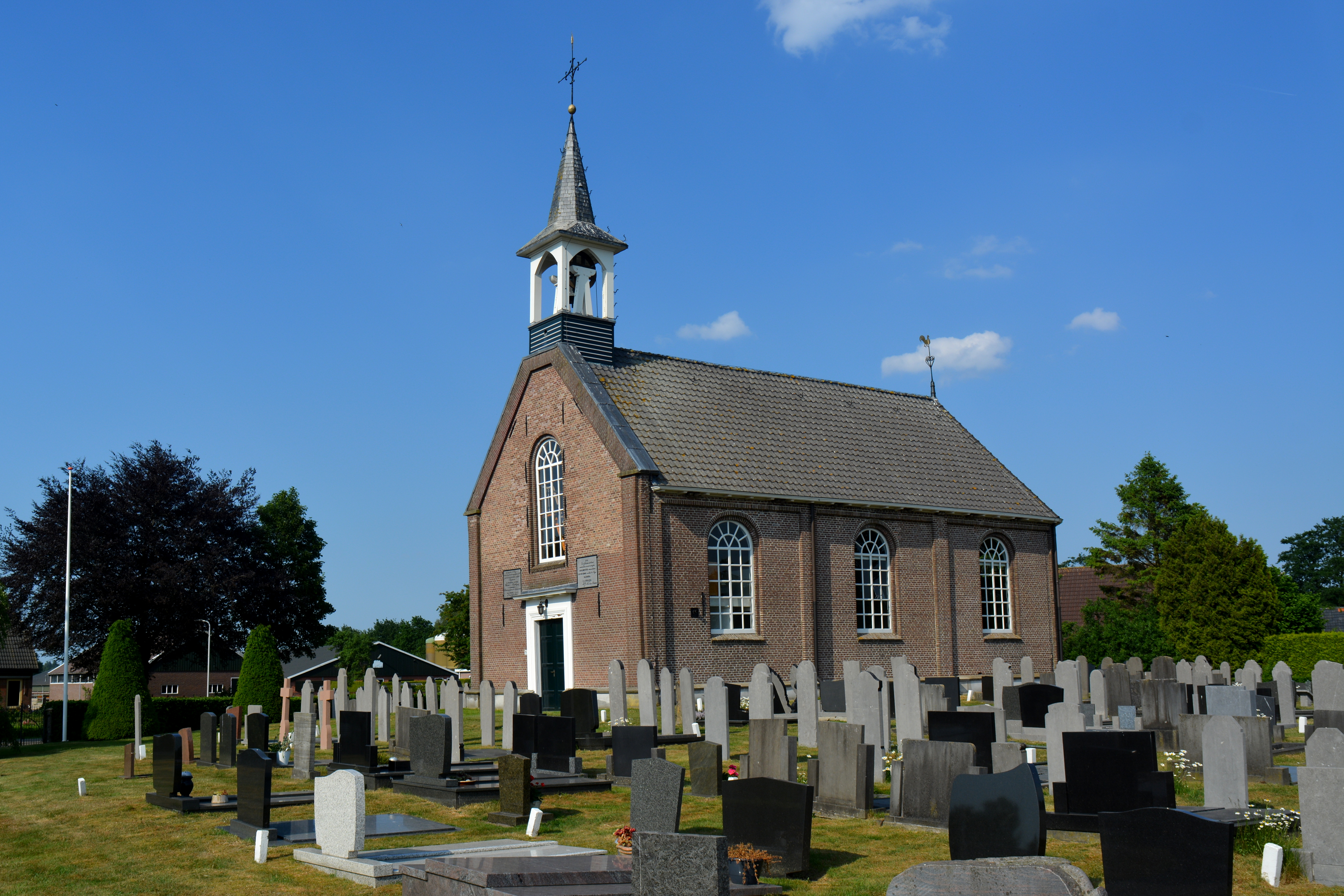
- Protestant Church

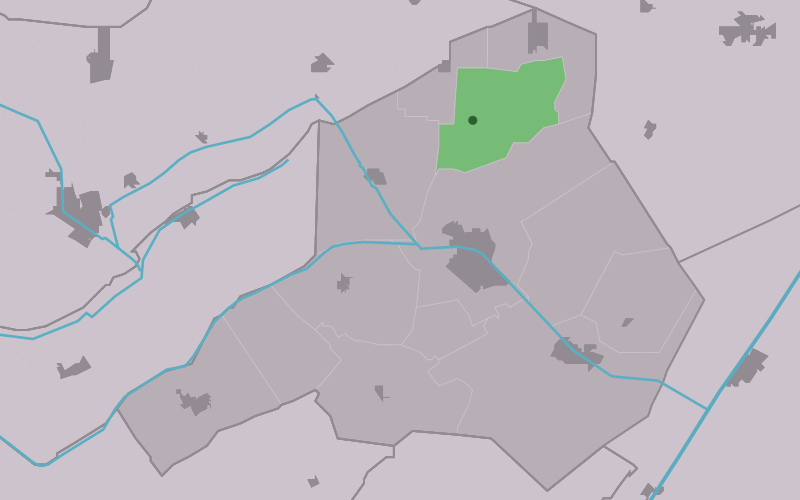
- Location in Ooststellingwerf municipality

- Location in the Netherlands Haule (Netherlands)
- Country: Netherlands
- Province: Friesland
- Municipality: Ooststellingwerf

Area
  - Total: 14.70 km^{2} (5.68 sq mi)
- Elevation: 6 m (20 ft)

Population (2021)
  - Total: 590
  - Density: 40/km^{2} (100/sq mi)
- Time zone: UTC+1 (CET)
  - Summer (DST): UTC+2 (CEST)
- Postal code: 8432
- Dialing code: 0516

Haule (West Frisian: De Haule) is a village consisting of about 600 inhabitants in the municipality of Ooststellingwerf in the east of Friesland in the Netherlands.

The village was first mentioned in 1408 as Die Hauwele. The etymology is unclear. Haule started as a stretched agricultural community on a sandy ridge surrounded by moorland. Up to the 16th century, wolves used to roam the wilderness. The church was built in 1328. Haule was home to 142 people in 1840.

== Gallery ==
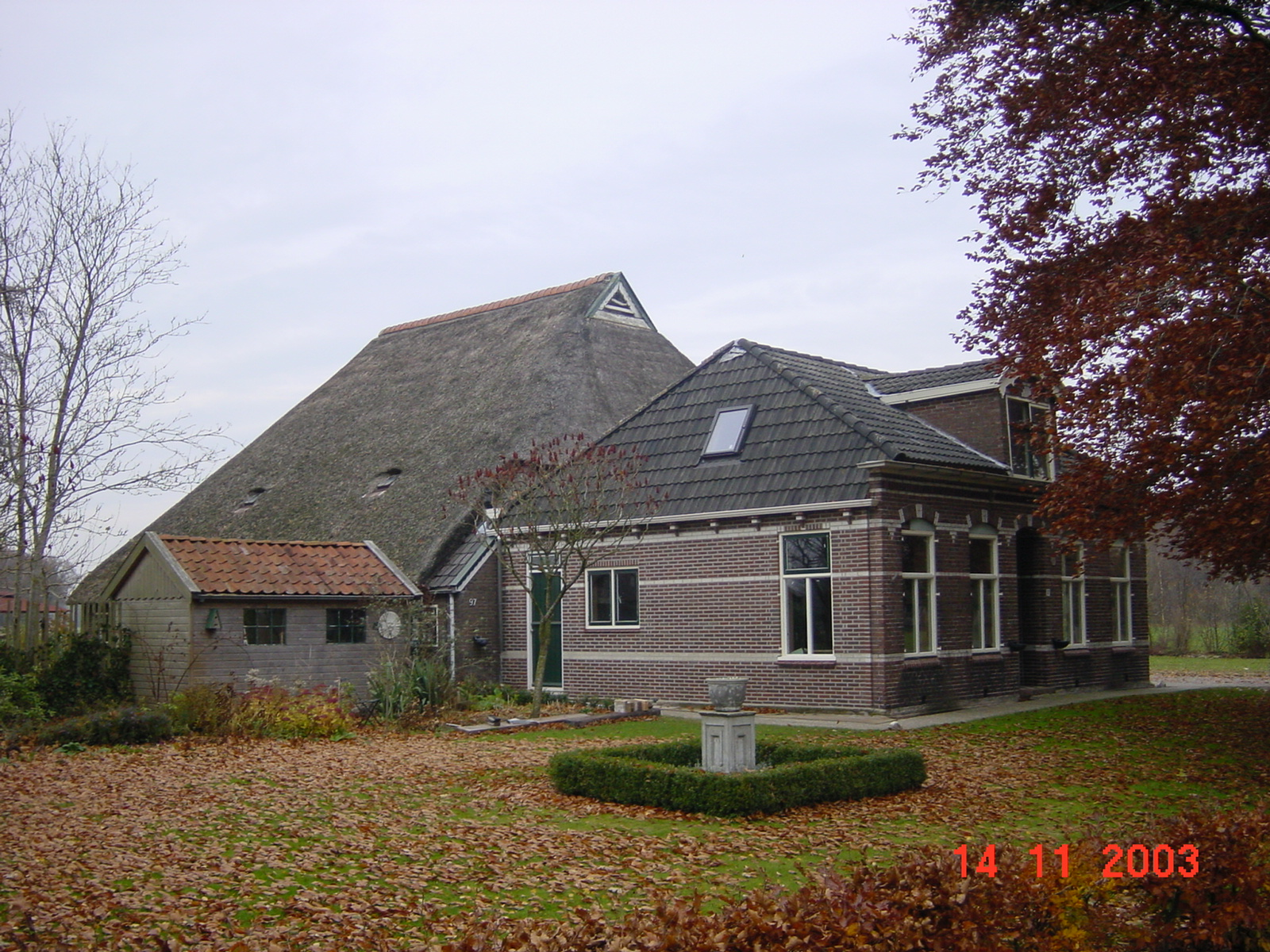
Farm in Haule

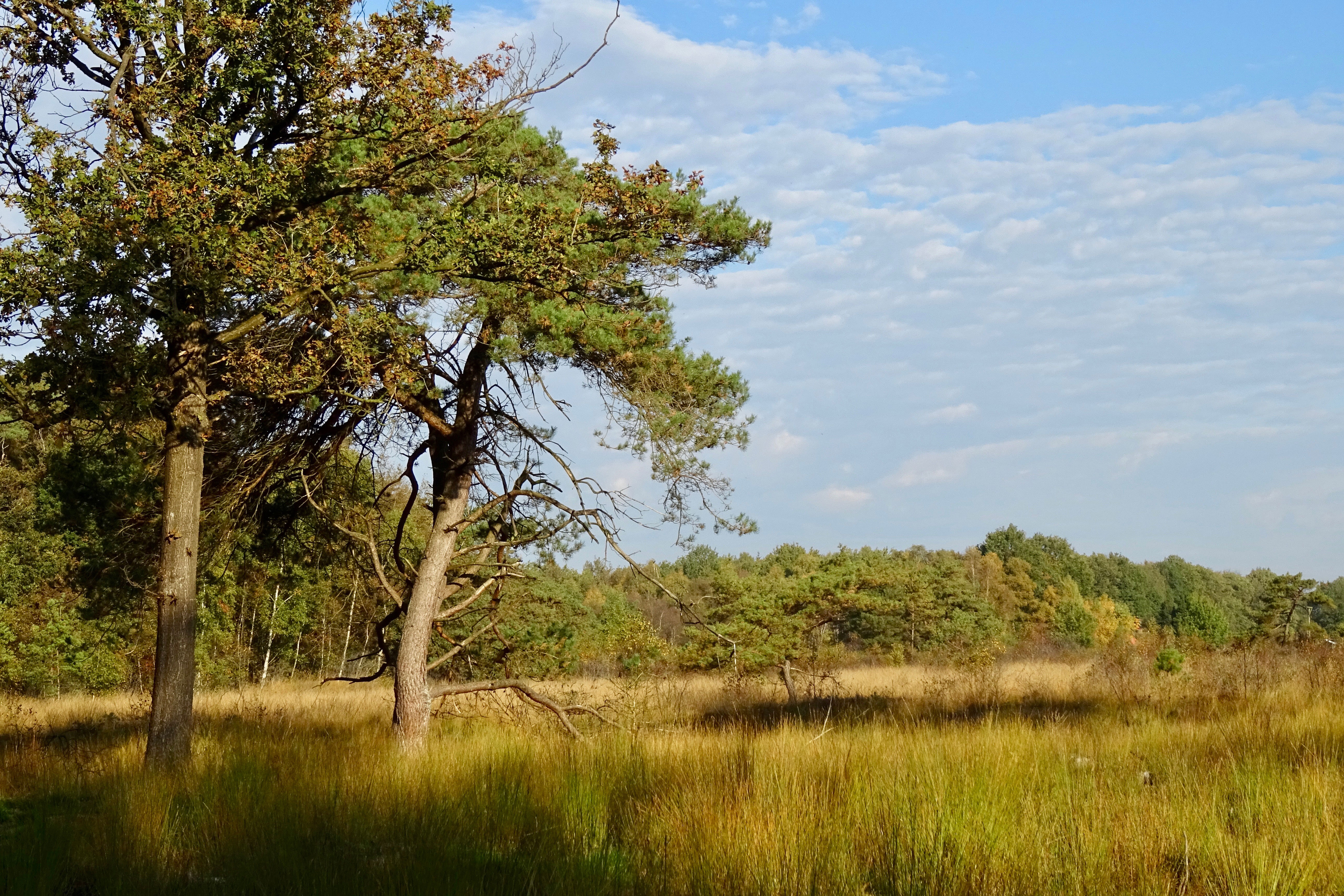
The Blauwe Bos (Blue Forest)
