= Jan Eise Kromkamp =

Dutch former speed skater (born 1955)

Personal information
- Nickname: De Kannibaal
- Born: 18 January 1955 (age 71) Fochteloo, Friesland, Netherlands
- Years active: 1984–2003

Sport
- Sport: Marathon speed skating Inline skating
- Events: Long distances and marathons

Jan Eise Kromkamp (born 18 January 1955) is a Dutch former marathon speed skater and inline skater. He completed the Elfstedentocht three times and skated the Alternative Elfstedentocht abroad more than twenty times, winning silver twice. In inline skating, he became a two-time national champion and holds the record for the highest number of victories.

== Career ==
=== Early years ===
Kromkamp was born in the village of Fochteloo, in the southeast of Friesland. He played football for the first team of the third-division club DIO Oosterwolde and, after moving, for VV Oldeholtpade, which competed in the first division of the Friesland Football Association (FVB). He disliked the rough style of play in the FVB and quit the sport following a knee injury. He opted for an individual sport that was also easier to combine with his irregular shifts as a senior police officer with the municipal police force in Weststellingwerf. In 1983, he took up marathon speed skating as a recreational skater. He soon advanced to the B-division and, at the age of 29, on Jeen van den Berg's recommendation, made the step up to the A-category. He soon made his presence felt at the front of the pack. A fourth-place finish in the marathon at Thialf in Heerenveen on 12 December 1984, was his first notable result.

=== Elfstedentocht and inline skating ===
Kromkamp was only a first-year A-division skater when the 1985 Elfstedentocht took place. He finished in 94th place. From May 1985, he devoted himself to inline skating; he led the standings for a long time but ultimately finished second behind Henri Ruitenberg. A year later, he appeared at the start of the 1986 Elfstedentocht better prepared and finished in sixteenth place. During the summer months, he resumed inline skating on asphalt roads, often with thousands of spectators lining the route. He racked up victories in abundance, winning nearly half the fifty inline skating races that he entered in 1986. Yet that year, he once again finished in second place in the Skeeler Cup standings. This time, Dries van Wijhe was the winner.

=== Marathon speed skating ===
In 1987, however, he hit the mark and won the Skeeler Cup by a wide margin. A week later, he also claimed the national title. Kromkamp held the record for the most inline skating victories, with 122, in the A-skater category. He became the Dutch champion for the second time in 1988 and won the open Dutch 100-kilometre championship in Hallum, Friesland, in 1997. Nevertheless, Kromkamp primarily viewed inline skating as a form of training for the off-season when there was no ice skating. His preference remained with marathon ice skating, a discipline in which he consistently performed well. He achieved his first marathon victory on 18 November 1987, in Heerenveen. This race counted towards the Royal Dutch Skating Federation (Koninklijke Nederlandsche Schaatsenrijders Bond; KNSB) Cup (marathon skating), in which he finished third in the standings in March 1988, behind winner Richard van Kempen and runner-up Yep Kramer.

=== Alternative Elfstedentocht ===
On 7 March 1987, Kromkamp participated for the first time in the Alternative Elfstedentocht, held in Kuopio, Finland. He crossed the finish line in nineteenth place. Over the course of his career, he competed in more than twenty Alternative races abroad. He finished second twice and won bronze three times. He secured his first silver medal on the bitterly cold Saturday of 5 March 1994, in Rovaniemi, in northern Finland. Kromkamp was part of the lead group, alongside Yep Kramer and Bert Verduin, that battled for the overall victory. Kramer proved just a little faster in the sprint. On 1 February 1997, at the Weißensee in Austria, Kromkamp had to concede victory to Ruud Borst after two missteps in the final sprint. Four weeks earlier, he had skated his third Elfstedentocht in the Netherlands, and crossed the finish line in seventeenth place.

=== Classic victories ===
Kromkamp often had to settle for a podium finish rather than the top spot. He twice won the silver medal at the unofficial marathon skating world championships: on 6 March 1991, in Kuopio, where Richard van Kempen won, and two years later at the Weißensee, where Kromkamp had to concede victory to René Ruitenberg. He had achieved his first victory in a natural-ice classic on 13 February 1991, crossing the finish line first after 200 kilometres at the Rottemerentocht in Zevenhuizen. In the sprint, he beat Bert Verduin and the brothers Evert and Henk van Benthem. He claimed his second classic victory in the Ronde van Loosdrecht on 2 February 1996. He crossed the finish line solo after 120 kilometres.

Jan Eise Kromkamp ended his speed skating career in 2003 at the age of 47, after twenty seasons. In his last races, he often competed alongside his son Martijn, who was making his début. At his last Dutch National Marathon Skating Championship on artificial ice, which was held in Heerenveen on Boxing Day 2002, he finished in eighteenth place. Martijn Kromkamp finished somewhat ahead of him, in thirteenth place.

After his active career, he became a team manager for squads such as "Bikelife", "FysioTotaal", and "Kooyenga Groep". In 2009, he became coach of the "Leontien.nl" women's marathon speed skating team, and subsequently of the Schaats- en Skeelerteam Fryslân (SSSF) foundation. Alongside his work in speed skating, Kromkamp held a full-time position with the police, most recently as a detective with the Northern Netherlands Regional Unit.

== Records ==
=== Personal bests ===
Distance	Time	Date	Track
500 m	42.00	8 October 1989	(Netherlands) Heerenveen
1500 m	2:04.30	23 February 1988	(Netherlands) Heerenveen
3000 m	4:14.60	23 February 1988	(Netherlands) Heerenveen
5000 m	7:30.06	9 December 1990	(Netherlands) Heerenveen
10 000 m	15:23.80	2 March 1987	(Netherlands) Heerenveen

== Marathon speed skating results ==
=== Results in major competitions ===
Year	NK artificial ice	NK natural ice	Open NK natural ice	WK natural ice (unofficial)	Jaap Eden Trophy	KNSB Cup standing	Heineken Zesdaagse	The Greenery Six	Alternative Elfstedentocht	Elfstedentocht
1985					17th		13th			94th
1986	13th	19th				6th	7th			16th
1987					11th	14th	6th		19th	
1988	6th					3rd place, bronze medalist(s)	9th			
1989						8th				
1990			14th			9th			19th	
1991	25th	9th		2nd place, silver medalist(s)	10th	11th			12th	
1992			14th			27th			9th	
1993	19th	2nd place, silver medalist(s)	2nd place, silver medalist(s)	2nd place, silver medalist(s)	5th				6th	
1994	22nd	4th		13th		17th			9th, (silver)	
1995	14th		15th		8th	9th			8th, 6th	
1996	14th	4th			2nd place, silver medalist(s)	8th			4th, 7th	
1997	22nd	12th	3rd place, bronze medalist(s)		16th	5th			2nd place, silver medalist(s)	17th
1998	22nd		45th		49th	14th			12th, (bronze)	
1999	19th		25th		21st	33rd		2nd place, silver medalist(s)	12th, (bronze)	
2000	9th		9th			17th		24th	23rd, (bronze)	
2001			12th		21st	24th		24th	4th	
2002	18th					30th		24th	4th	
2003	18th		46th			44th		33rd	20th	

=== Results in natural-ice classics ===
Year	De 100 van Eernewoude	Amstelmeer Marathon	Ronde van Loosdrecht	Westland Marathon	Noordwest- hoekrit	Oldambt- rit	Hollands Venetiëtocht	Rottemeren- tocht	Veluwemeer- tocht	USA Marathon	Klassieker Cup
1986	9th							7th			
1987					3rd place, bronze medalist(s)		9th				
1991			12th				5th	1st place, gold medalist(s)			8th
1994	4th										
1996	5th	10th	1st place, gold medalist(s)			9th	4th		9th		4th
1997		5th		9th			7th	5th	7th	3rd place, bronze medalist(s)	2nd place, silver medalist(s)

=== Medal table ===
Championship	Gold (gold)	Silver (silver)	Bronze (bronze)
NK natural ice	0	1	0
Open natural ice	0	1	1
KNSB Cup standing	0	0	1
Natuurijsklassiekers	2	0	2
Klassieker Cup	0	1	0
Alternative Elfstedentocht	0	2	3
Meerdaagse	0	1	0
Races on artificial ice	3	16	13

- Profile of Jan Eise Kromkamp at Schaatspeloton.nl
