= Stellingwarfs dialect =

Westphalian dialect spoken in Friesland

Stellingwarfs
- Stellingwarfs, Stellingwerf, Stellingwerfs
- Native to: Netherlands
- Region: Northeast, Stellingwerven region, Friesland province. Centers are Oosterwolde and Wolvega.
- Native speakers: 5,000 (2016)
- Language family: Indo-European: Germanic; West Germanic; North Sea Germanic; Low German; Low Saxon; Westphalian; Stellingwarfs

Official status
- Official language in: Netherlands - Recognized by the government in 1996 as being part of Low Saxon [nds].

Language codes
- ISO 639-3: stl
- Glottolog: stel1238

Stellingwarfs (Dutch: Stellingwerfs) is a Westphalian and Friso-Saxon dialect spoken in Ooststellingwerf and Weststellingwerf in the Dutch province of Friesland, and also in Steenwijkerland and Westerveld in the Dutch province of Overijssel and Drenthe.

Like Het Bildt and Leeuwarden, Weststellingwerf and Ooststellingwerf are among the municipalities of Friesland where West Frisian is not spoken.

The language was identified by the government of the Netherlands in 1996 within Low Saxon.

== Phonology ==
=== Consonants ===
		Labial	Alveolar	Retroflex	Dorsal	Glottal
Stop	voiceless	p	t	ʈ	k	
Stop	voiced	b	d	ɖ	ɡ	
Fricative	voiceless	f	s	ʂ	χ	h
Fricative	voiced	v	z	ʐ		
Nasal		m	n	ɳ	ŋ	
Trill			r			
Approximant		ʋ	l	ɭ	j	
