= Elsloo, Friesland =

Elsloo
- Village
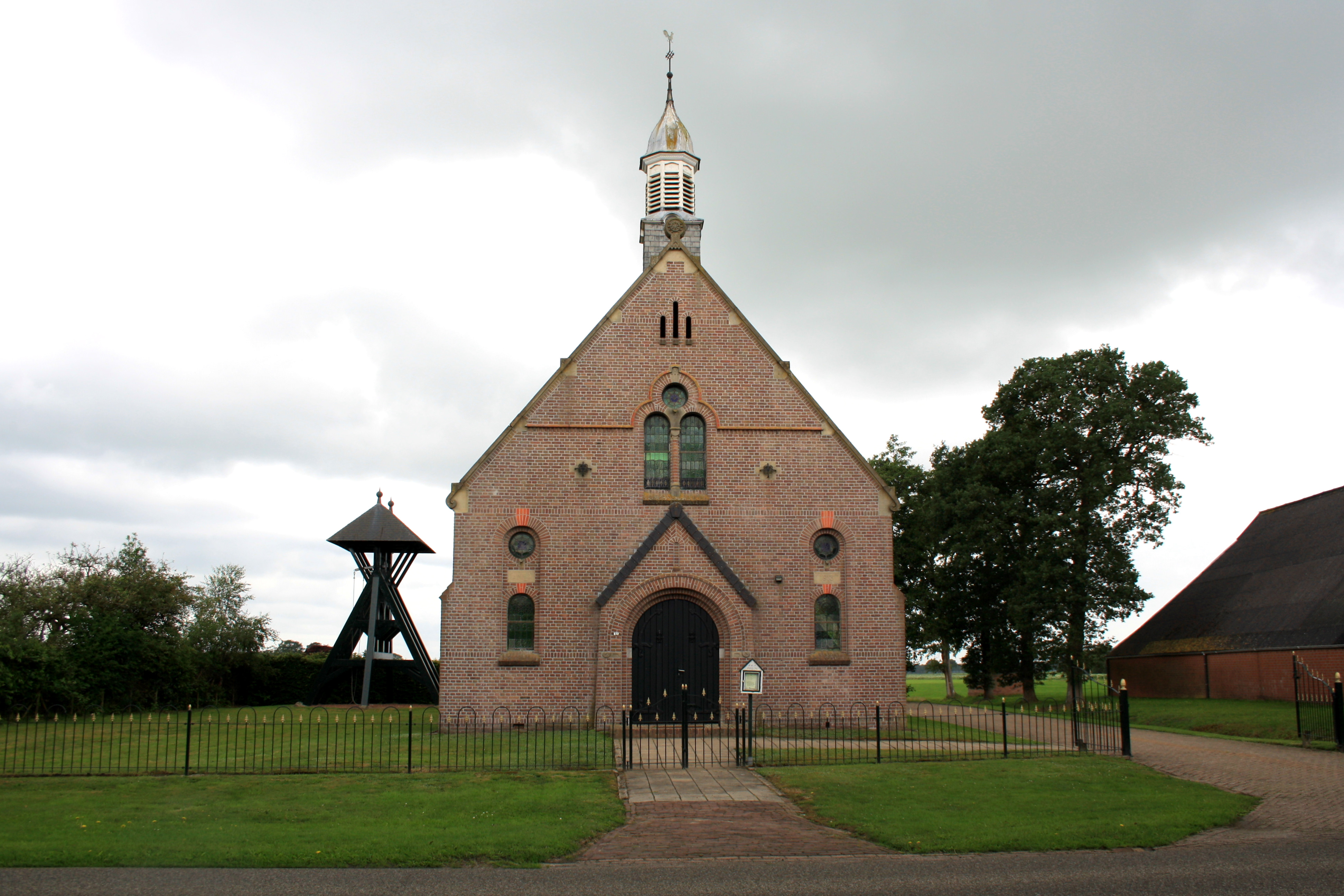
- Elsloo Church

- Flag

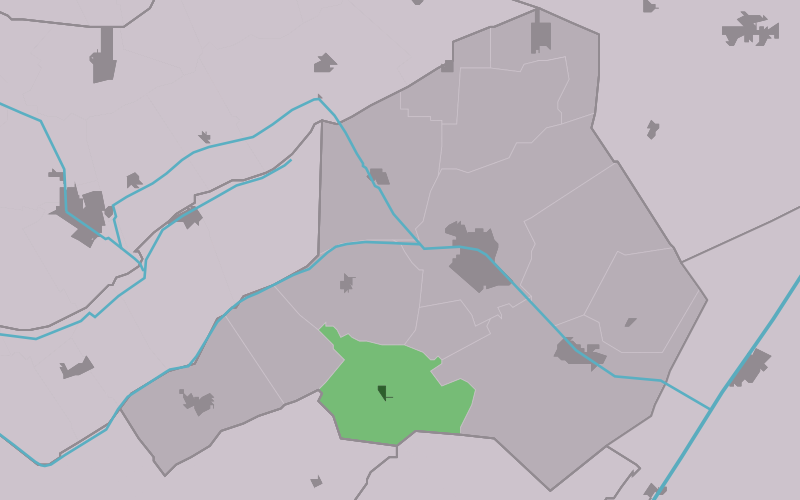
- Location in Ooststellingwerf municipality

- Location in the Netherlands Elsloo (Netherlands)
- Country: Netherlands
- Province: Friesland
- Municipality: Ooststellingwerf

Area
  - Total: 17.73 km^{2} (6.85 sq mi)
- Elevation: 7 m (23 ft)

Population (2021)
  - Total: 685
  - Density: 38.6/km^{2} (100/sq mi)
- Time zone: UTC+1 (CET)
  - Summer (DST): UTC+2 (CEST)
- Postal code: 8424
- Dialing code: 0516
- Website: Official

Elsloo (West Frisian: Elslo) is a village consisting of around 600 inhabitants in the municipality of Ooststellingwerf in the east of Friesland in the Netherlands.

The hamlets considered part of the village are Tronde and Canada.

== History ==
The village was first mentioned in 1002 as Elisla. The etymology is unclear. Elsloo developed as a road village. The monastery Lux Mundi used to be near Elsloo. It was destroyed in the 16th century, and its exact location is unknown. The Dutch Reformed church dates from 1913, and is a replacement of a 1632 predecessor. In 1987, a double belfry has been added to the church. In 1840, it was home to 239 people.

== Gallery ==
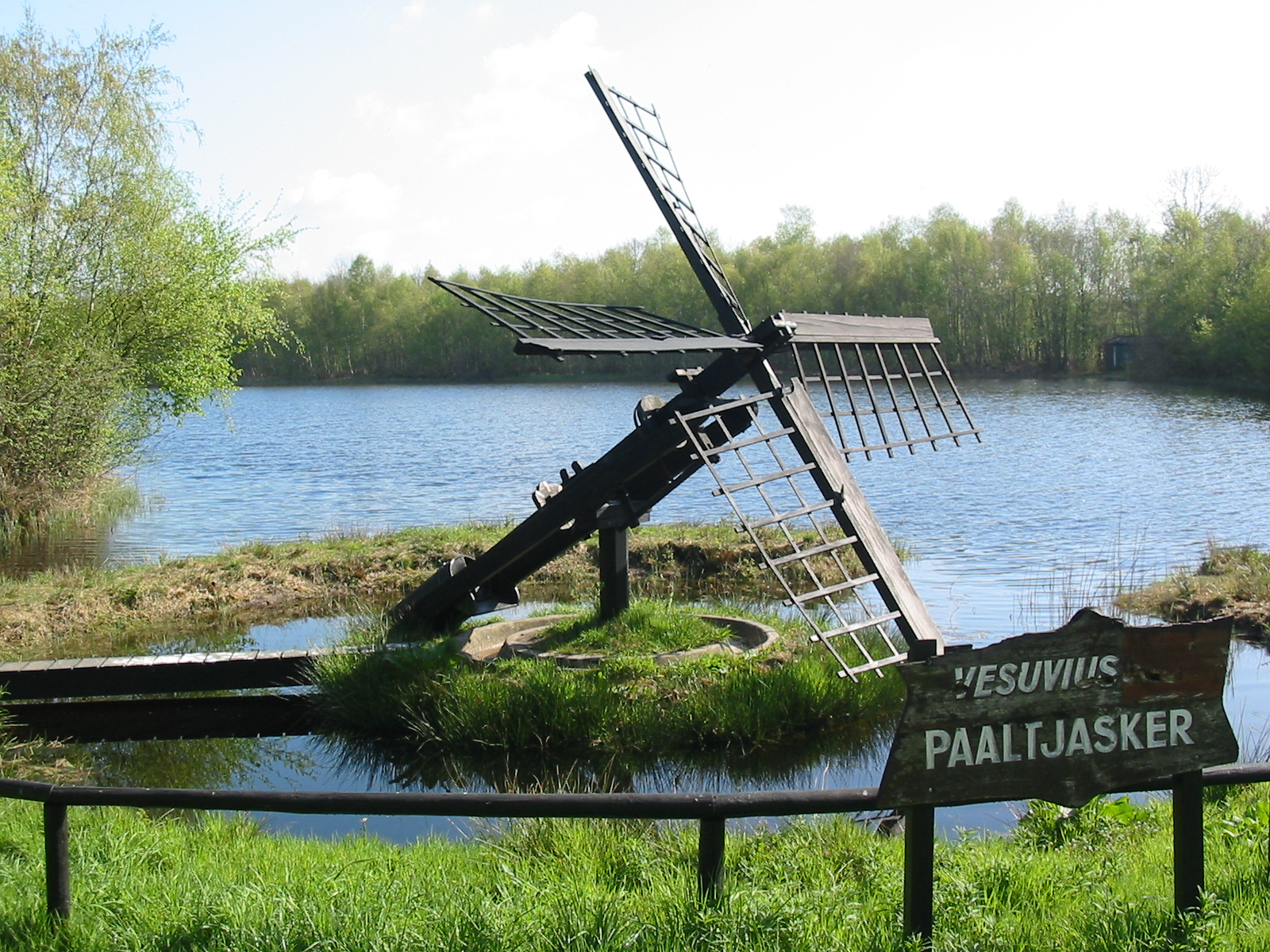
Tjasker Vesuvius

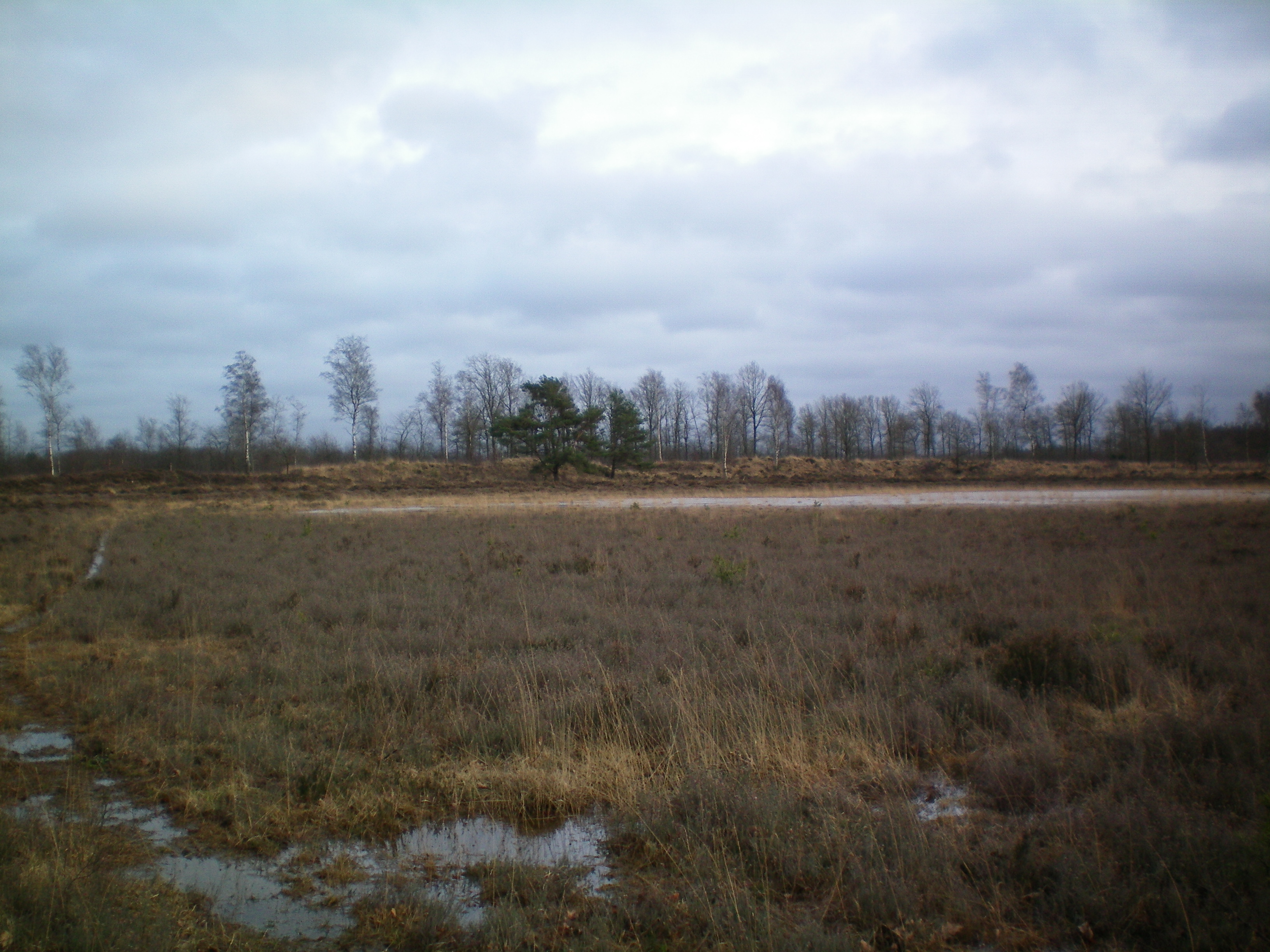
Landscape

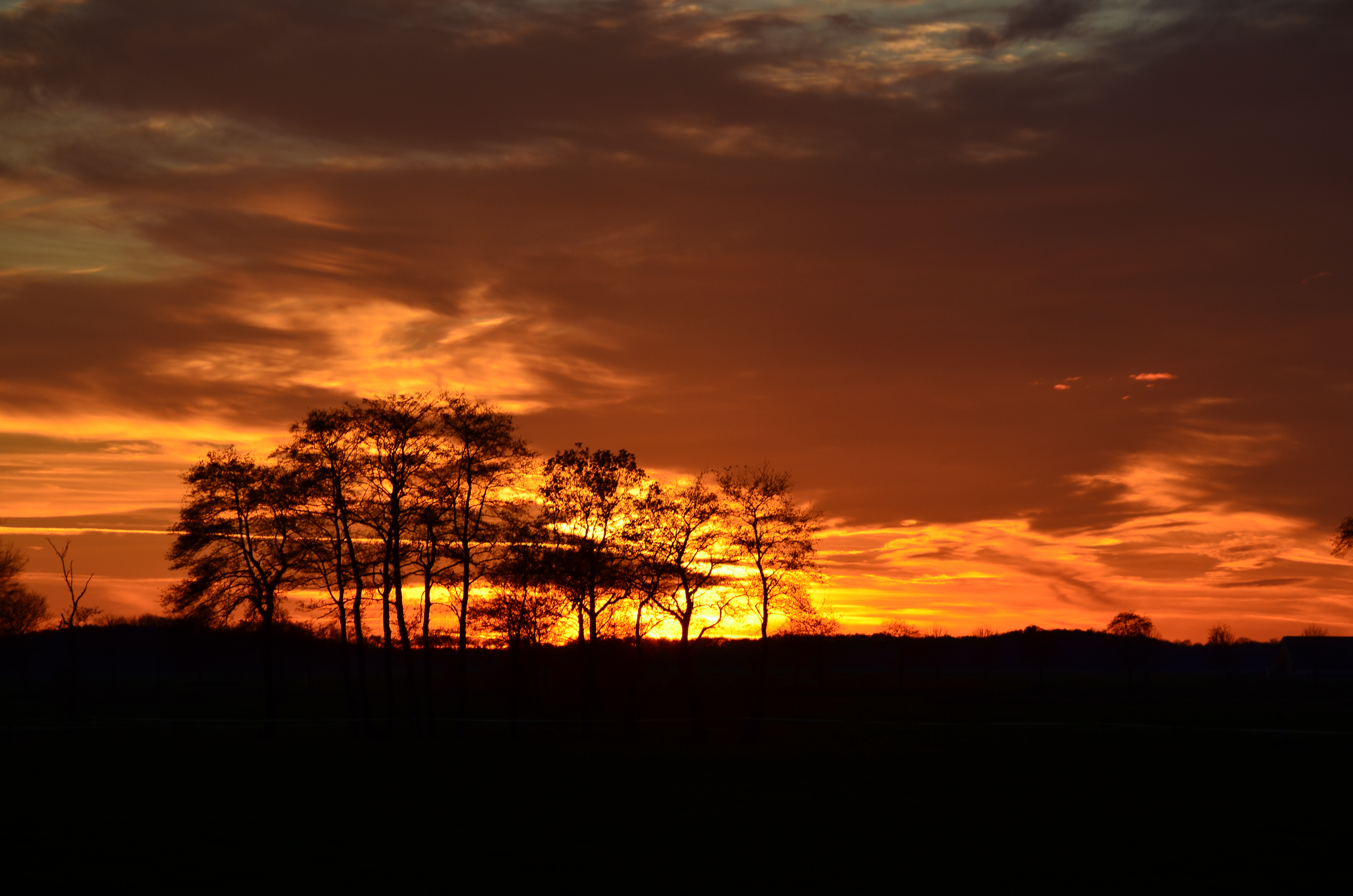
Sunset in Elsloo

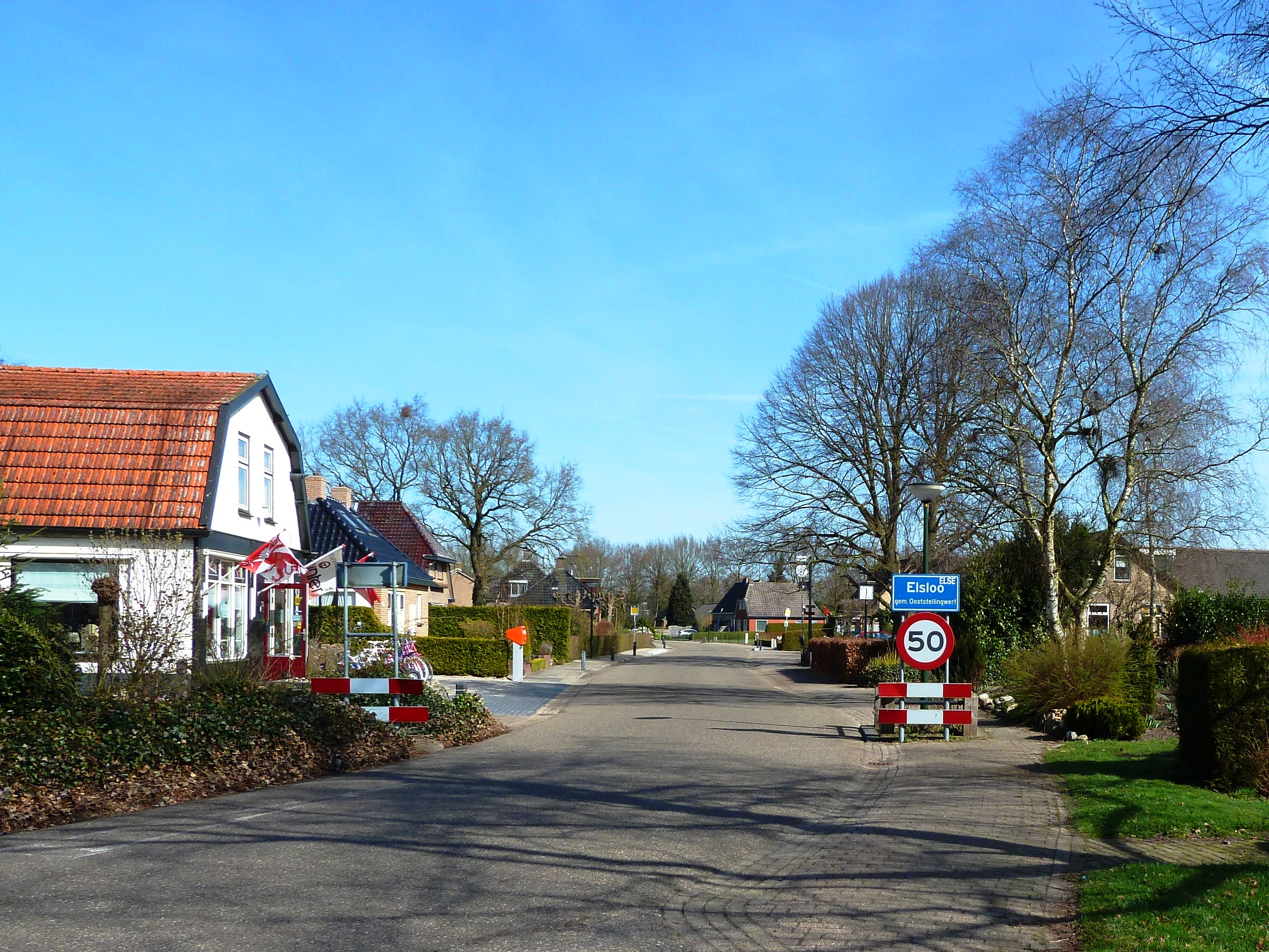
Welcome to Elsloo
