= Anarchism in the Netherlands =

Anarchism in the Netherlands originated in the second half of the 19th century. Its roots lay in the radical and revolutionary ideologies of the labor movement, in anti-authoritarian socialism, the free thinkers and in numerous associations and organizations striving for a libertarian form of society. During the First World War, individuals and groups of syndicalists and anarchists of various currents worked together for conscientious objection and against government policies. The common resistance was directed against imperialism and militarism.

One of the country's first anarchists, Ferdinand Domela Nieuwenhuis, came from social-democratic circles and did much to organize the working class. As a social movement, anarchism had a great influence on the social change of society in the Netherlands, until the beginning of the Second World War. After the war, anarchism became active again in the 1960s and through the Provo movement became known to the wider public.

== History ==
=== Forerunners ===
Anarchism in the Netherlands was initially referred to as communist-anarchisme, then as sociaal-anarchisme, revolutionair-socialisme and anarcho-syndicalisme.

People of the Christian and Jewish faith who brought Christianity and Judaism into connection with socialist and anarchist ideas, especially pastors and preachers, were generally given the name rode Dominee ("red pastor"). They preached "freedom of thought" and a "modern" theology. In the province of Friesland, for example, there were seventeen "socialist pastors" around 1932, fourteen of whom were members of the Social Democratic Workers' Party (Dutch: Sociaal-Demokratische Arbeiderspartij, SDAP). The "red pastors" did a lot to bridge the gap between Christian and Jewish beliefs, the labor movement, and anarchism.

One of the pioneers of socialism and anarchism in the Netherlands was the Christian socialist Leendert de Baan, a pastor and advocate of conscientious objection. Politically he was a supporter of the Bond van Christian Socialists. The religious socialist and pastor Henri Wilhelm Philippus Elize van den Bergh van Eysinga, active in the Socialist Verbond. He propagated a "revolutionary socialism" (revolutionair-socialisme) and communism. Johannes Antonius Hendrikus van den Brink, a priest, the first socialist member of the Limburg parish council, member of the SDAP and socialist since 1904. He was criticized as a "renegade priest" (afvallige priester). In lectures he espoused socialist propaganda and saw church and worship as a danger to humanity and social progress. From 1910 he gave readings for the freethinkers association De Dageraad. The spokesman for the "red pastors" in the Dutch province of Friesland, Jan Anthonie Bruins Jr., came to socialism through Ferdinand Domela Nieuwenhuis. He was the founder of the Christian-socialist weekly De Blijde Wereld. Among other things, he was active in the "Arbeiter-Jugend" and the Nederlandsche Vereeniging tot Afschaffing van Alcoholhoudende Dranken ("Dutch Association for the Abolition of Spirits"). The "red dominee" Frederik Willem Nicolaas Hugenholtz expressed criticism of capitalism. He wanted to found an arbeiderskerk (literally: "workers' church"), but had difficulties with the population who wanted to dismiss him as pastor. In 1899 he became a propagandist for the Social Democratic Workers' Party. Jan Lambertus Faber, also a "red pastor", was a member of the House of Representatives for the SDAP. As a pacifist and member of the Christian anti-militarist association Kerk en Vrede ("Church and Peace"), he had a large following among socialist workers.

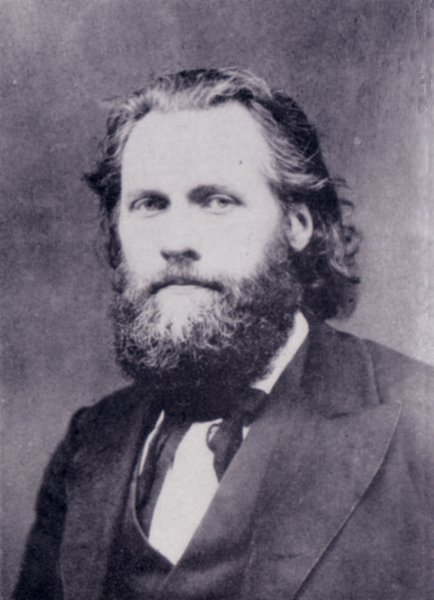
Ferdinand Domela Nieuwenhuis in 1873.

In 1889, the pastor and socialist pioneer Nieuwenhuis first professed anarchism. Hendrik Gerhard, a member of De Dageraad and a freethinker, was called de vader van het socialisme in Nederland (literally: "the father of socialism in the Netherlands"). His ideal was gelijkrecht voor allen ("equal rights for all"). He was active in the peace and labor movement and rejected violence to achieve a socialist society. Johan Jacob Ledewijk, advocate of communist anarchism (sociaal-anarchisme), was the founder of the Federatie van Vrijheidlievende Communisten ("Federation of Freedom-Loving Communists"), editor of the magazine De Vrije Communist and De Toekomst of the Federatie van Revolutionaire Socialisten ("Federation of Revolutionary Socialists") and active in the Sociaal-Anarchist Verbond. Abraham Mozes Reens, propagandist for revolutionary socialism and anarchism, was the founder of the anti-verbingvereniging and the magazine Opstand. Sjoerd Siebrens van Veen, one of the first Christian socialists, was a follower of Nieuwenhuis and especially active in the province of Friesland. In 1888 he founded of the Sociaal-Democratische Bond ("Social Democratic League") in Friesland. He proclaimed the revolutionaire van de bijbelse boodschap ("the revolutionary from the biblical message"). Later Christian socialists declared that through the work of van Veen, Christian socialism found a following in Friesland. Daniël van der Zee is considered a pioneer of Christian socialism. In 1907 he was co-founder of the Bond van Christen-Socialisten (BCS), editor of the Opwaarts magazine and board member of the Religieus-Socialistische Verbond ("Religious Socialist Association") and of the Instituut voor Arbeidersontwikkeling (literally: "Institute for Workers' Development"; IvAO).

=== 19th century ===
During the second half of the 19th century, with a few exceptions, the similarities between anti-authoritarian socialism and anarchism were greater than the differences. The boundaries between the two worldviews were fluid. By 1870 the social and economic conditions in the Netherlands were in crisis: high unemployment, low wages, child labor, child mortality and alcohol abuse. Housing and food were insufficient. At this time the mood of the proletariat became more and more radical, which was also expressed in the magazine Recht voor Allen. The first social legislation banned child labor in 1874: children under the age of twelve were forbidden to work.

William III ruled the Netherlands between 1849 and 1890. He contributed to the repression against the socialists and anarchists, as well as the labor movement. William III was known as a "brute", who had a great predilection for hunting, alcohol, women and public brothel visits. The "half-mad" king was known for his tantrums and unpredictability, and became a symbol of oppression and decadence. He is said to have called his people stupid oxen, mob and trash. He insulted even the most conservative ministers. Josef Alexander Cohen called out "the gorilla king" in public and was sentenced to six months in prison for lese majesty. Nieuwenhuis was also sentenced to one year in prison for lese majesty, on the basis of an April 1886 article in the magazine Recht voor Allen, which was directed against the monarchy. It was unclear whether Nieuwenhuis was the author, but as the main editor he had taken on responsibility.

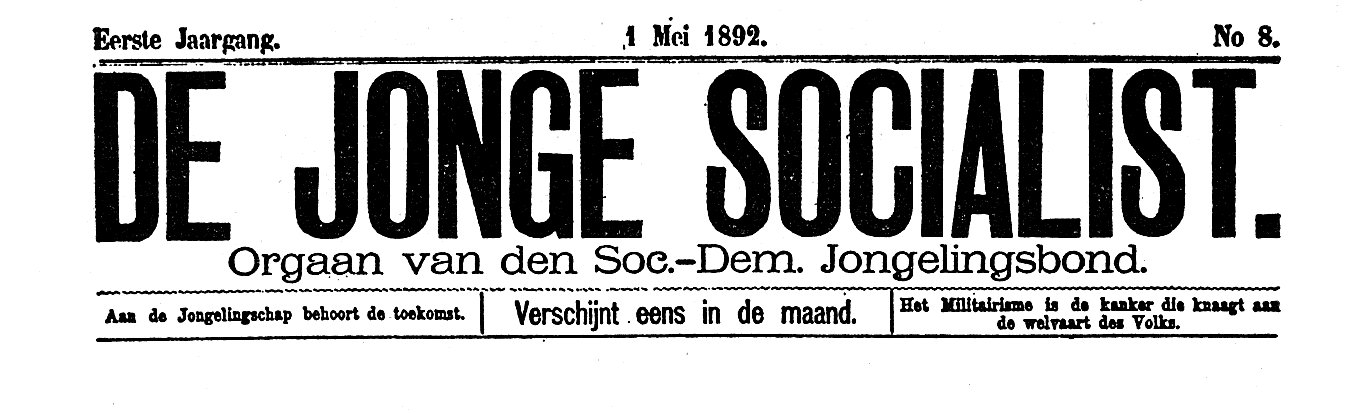
Logo of De Jonge Socialist magazine (1892).

The north of the Netherlands was one of the economically poorest areas in the second half of the 19th century, especially the province of Friesland. The economic crisis was fertile ground for socialism. Labor strikes had often happened in Friesland. As far as is known, the first strike occurred as early as 1810, and about 76 more followed by 1887. The best-known champions of the labor movement were Pieter Jelles Troelstra, head of the SDAP from 1894 to 1925, and Nieuwenhuis.

The socialists and anarchists were repressed by the state, in 1893, 53 of them were in prison. Nieuwenhuis was active as a speaker especially in Friesland and won many workers to his socialist ideas. The Frisian village of Appelscha was founded in 1827, with the influx of thousands of workers who were urgently needed for peatland colonization. The strikes of 1888 were the beginning of organized workers' uprisings in the Netherlands and the village was considered a stronghold of radical socialism and anarchism. During a strike in 1888, the first small trade union was founded in Friesland, De Eendracht, which worked regionally and had Bruin Tjibbes Bruinsma as its chairman. The striking workers demonstrated with a red flag and the words gelijkheid, vrijheid en broederschap. Subsequent labor strikes were coordinated, and workers fought for a written agreement on their working conditions.

In 1855 the magazine De Dageraad appeared. In October 1856, the editorial team founded the freethinkers association De Dageraad. This association arose out of an interest in founding an organized freethinker movement and, from 1879 onwards, focused on issues such as emancipation, universal suffrage, anti-militarism, homosexuality and the separation of church and state. De Dageraad wanted to be autonomous in thinking and acting in the scientific, ethical and political fields. It edited the magazines De Vrijdenker (from 1945 to 1958) and Bevrijdend Denk (from 1959 to 1963). From 1957, the association continued to work under the name Vrijdenkersvereniging De Vrije Gedachte. The name came from Franz Wilhelm Junghuhn. De Vrije Gedachte ("The Free Thought") has been working with the Humanistisch Verbond since 1957. De Dageraad members were mainly socialists, liberals and anarchists.

The Coöperatieve Broodbakkerij (bread baker's cooperative), known under the name Volharding was inspired by the first cooperatives in Ghent, the so-called volksbakkerijen, which were founded by Belgian socialists during the great famine. In a major article in Recht voor Allen in January 1880, written by Nieuwenhuis, reference was made to the cooperatives in Belgium. This led to the establishment of De Volharding in Groningen. Later these cooperative extended to The Hague, Amsterdam, Rotterdam and Heerlen, among other cities. Frans Drion and Bartholomeus van Ommeren worked in the bread baker's cooperative.

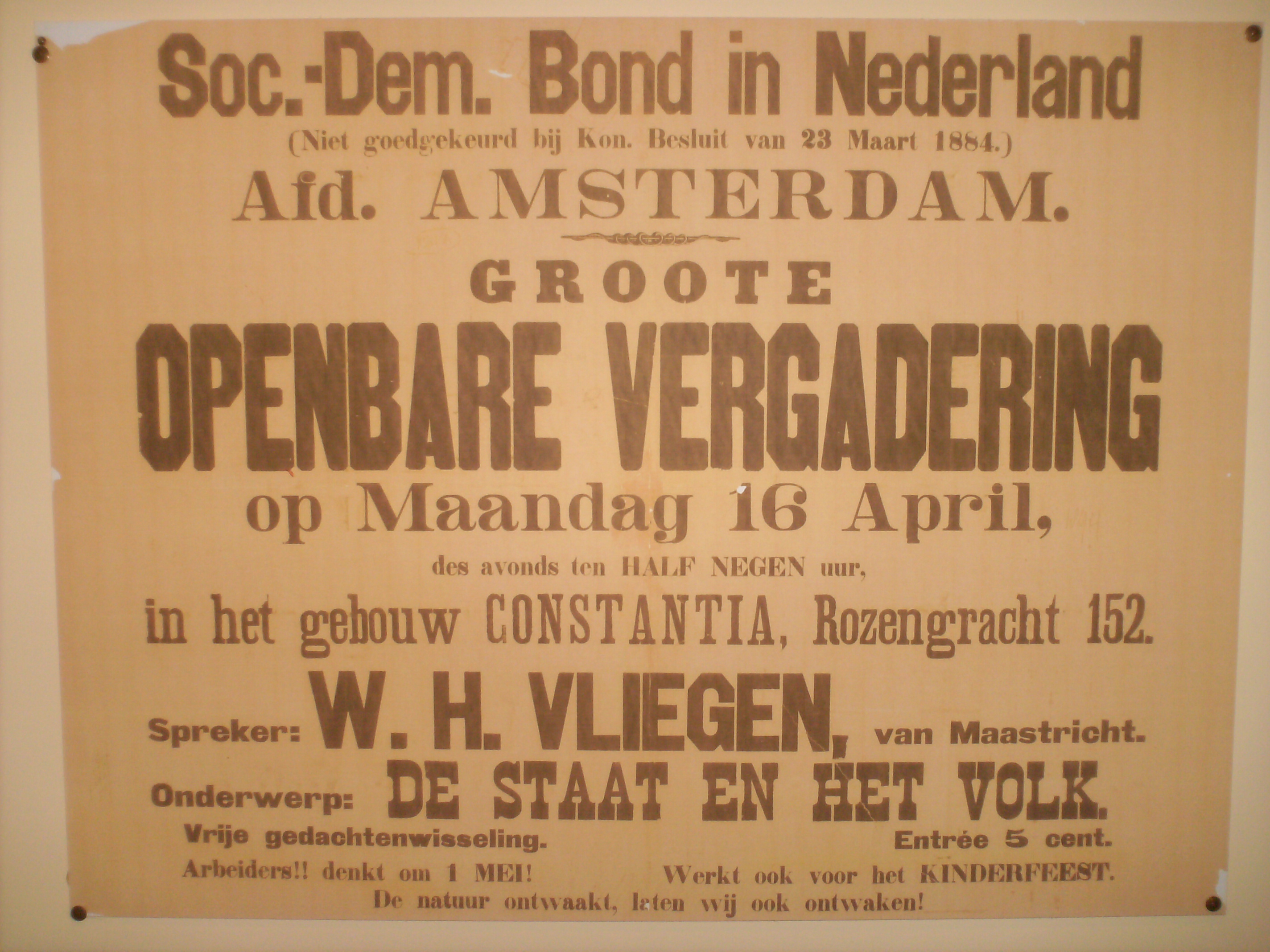
SDB poster in Amsterdam department.

The initially revolutionary-socialist party the Social Democratic League (Dutch: Sociaal-Democratische Bond, SDB) was founded in 1881 as an amalgamation of some regional associations and was mainly active in Friesland. After 1890 the party also got supporters in the provinces of Groningen, Amsterdam and Zaandam. In 1893 the SDB was banned and changed its name to Socialistenbond. Initially the party was in favor of a Marxist-socialist society without private property. But after 1893, the party introduced an extra-parliamentary and anarchist course under the direction of Ferdinand Domela Nieuwenhuis.

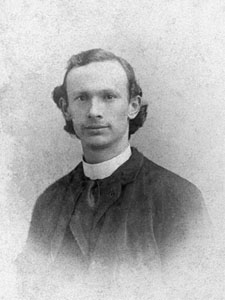
Christiaan Cornelissen

In 1893 the first major trade union called the National Labor Secretariat (Dutch: Nationaal Arbeids-Secretariat, NAS) was founded, along with its magazine De Arbeid. During the First World War, the libertarian movement in the Netherlands grew significantly. The NAS reached a membership of 50,000. However, the leadership of the NAS was won over to Marxism, whereupon the anarcho-syndicalists left the union and founded their own union, the Dutch Syndicalist Trade Union Federation (Dutch: Nederlands Syndicalistisch Vakverbond, NSV). The chairman of the NAS, Bernardus Lansink jr., founded the Regional Federation of Revolutionary Socialists (Dutch: Landelijke Federatie van Revolutionaire Socialisten, FRS) together with communist anarchists in 1905. The anarchists within the NAS took it from Lansink Jr., propagandist and editor of the magazine De Syndicalist, after it was discovered that he was a member of the Socialist Party (SP). After the NSV joined the IWA, it formed the International Secretariat of the IWA together with Rudolf Rocker and Augustin Souchy. Christiaan Cornelissen was temporarily a member of the board of the NAS. The magazine De Vrije Socialist, published by Nieuwenhuis, and the NAS were closely linked.

After the Social Democratic Workers' Party (Dutch: Sociaal-Demokratische Arbeiderspartij, SDAP) was founded in 1896, there was a split within the Socialist League. Some of the members, led by Nieuwenhuis, undertook an anarchist approach, while the other members joined the SDAP.

=== 20th century ===
In 1904, Nieuwenhuis founded the International Anti-Militarist Association (Dutch: Internationale Anti-Militaristische Vereniging, IAMV).

In 1907 the International Anarchist Congress of Amsterdam took place.

In 1918 the Socialistische Partij (SP) was founded, which was a radical socialist and republican party, closely associated with the NAS. Its program included the introduction of a republic, free school tuition, the introduction of an eight-hour working day, the fight against alcohol abuse and a ban on child labor.

In March 1918, the socialist Workers Youth Central (Dutch: Arbeiders Jeugd Centrale, AJC) emerged, which was founded as a youth organization by the Nederlands Verbond van Vakverenigingen ("Dutch Federation of Trade Unions") and the SDAP. During the Second World War, in August 1940, the AJC was discontinued, but some activities continued underground. After the war, the AJC was re-established and since the youth had less interest in the traditional AJC style, it was discontinued in February 1959.

In 1921 the International Anti-Militarist Bureau (IAMB) was founded, followed by the International Anti-Militarist Commission (IAK) in 1926. The IAK promoted international cooperation, especially with the International Workers' Association in Berlin. Between 1929 and 1938, international congresses took place, among others in The Hague (1929), Frankfurt am Main (1929), Brussels (1932) and Montevideo (1933).

The Nederlands Syndicalistische Verbond (NSV), from 1923 to 1940, was an anti-parliamentary force with an aim to destroy state structures. In November 1926, it introduced the term "anarcho-syndicalisme" to the Netherlands, together with Albert de Jong when he founded the Gemengde Syndicalistische Vereeniging. From 1932 to 1935 the NSV published the anarcho-syndicalist magazine Grondslagen.

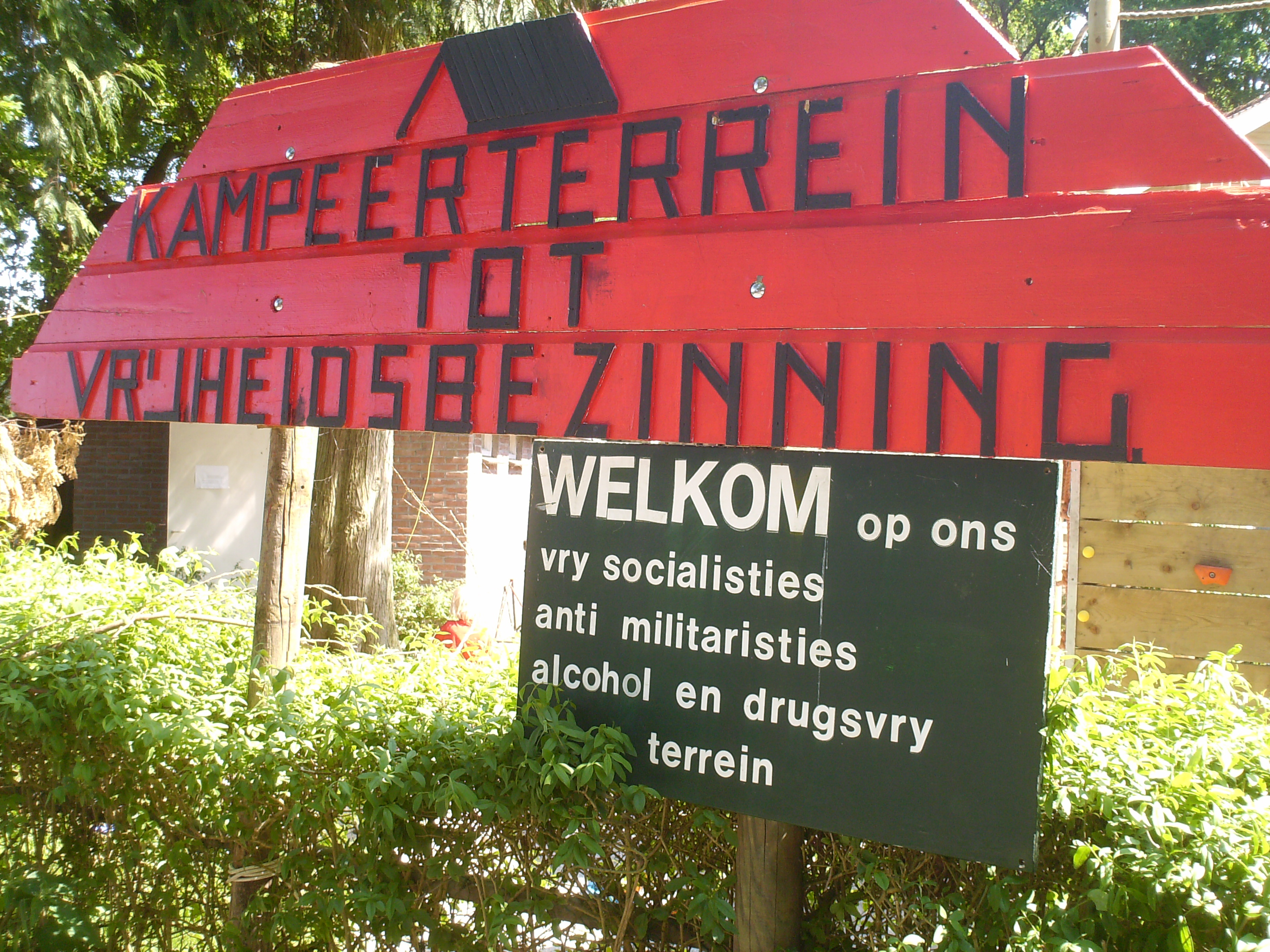
"Tot Vrijheidsbezinning, welcome to the Pinksterlanddagen".

In 1924, near the Frisian town of Appelscha, anarchist youths organized the Pinksterlanddagen for the first time on the Ter Vrijheidsbezinning site. Since then, the village has had a reputation as a stronghold of socialism and anarchism, to which the Pinksterland Days still bear witness today.

Of the 32 anti-militarist and pacifist organizations, which had around 25,000 members and existed between 1919 and 1932, a large number united together with a number of political and humanitarian organizations in the No more war federation (Dutch: Nooit Meer Oorlog Federatie, NMOF).

In 1937, Anton Levien Constandse and fifteen groups founded the Federation of Anarchists (Dutch: Federatie van Anarchisten, FAN) to support the Federación Anarquista Ibérica (FAI).

==== World War II ====
During the Second World War and the Nazi occupation of the Netherlands, there was no coordinated anarchist resistance to National Socialism. The anarchist resistance instead came from individual actions and activities. These were mainly aimed at falsifying documents, bringing German and Dutch anarchists in direct danger to safety, printing and distributing illegal newspapers and pamphlets, and helping the Jewish population. In a few exceptions, violence was used.

During the war, Lambertus Johannes Bot helped persecuted Jews go into hiding. Two Jewish citizens were arrested at his home.

In 1933, Albert de Jong helped Gerhard Wartenberg flee to avoid persecution by the Nazis. Together with the Dutch anarchist Herman Groenendaal, de Jong organized a solidarity rally for the Jews in Amsterdam. Groenendaal was arrested, but de Jong managed to escape and had to go into hiding.

Chris Lebeau entered into a marriage of convenience with a Jewish woman who had fled the Nazis. In November 1943 they were both arrested on the grounds that they had offered their help to Dutch Jews. Lebeau took all responsibility, which freed his wife. He himself could have been released from prison if he promised not to carry out any more illegal activities in the future, including forging documents. But Lebeau refused and was taken to Kamp Vught in February 1944. In May 1944 he was sent to the Dachau concentration camp.

Felix Ortt helped refugees in Soest, who had to go into hiding.

Laura Carola Mazirel was a lawyer and anti-fascist resistance fighter. She campaigned for homosexual and women's rights. Her legal office served in part as a cover for resistance activities; providing information, contacting people and organizing accommodation for people who were being persecuted. In 1943, Mazirel was one of the organizers of the attack on the Amsterdam population register in the Apollobuurt district, to destroy the personal information of politically persecuted people.

==== Post-war ====
After the war, new organizations and groups were founded. One of the first was the Free Socialist Association (Dutch: Vrije Socialisten Vereniging, VSV). Founded in 1945, it was a continuation of the pre-war groups around De Vrije Socialist magazine.

A year later, the Dutch Association of Free Socialists (Dutch: Nederlandse Bond van Vrije Socialisten, NBVS), an initiative of the Rudolf Rocker Foundation. The aim of the NBVS was personal freedom and the abolition of economic inequality.

The VSV and NBVS merged in September 1952. The new organization was named the Federation of Anarchists in the Netherlands (Dutch: Federatie van Anarchisten in Nederland, FAN). After some misgivings, the FAN dissolved, but was continued under a new name in 1954 as the Federation of Free Socialists in the Netherlands (Dutch: Federatie van Vrije Socialisten in Nederland, FVS). After the founding of FAN, an opposition group emerged around the Vrijheid magazine, with the first edition being published on 24 October 1953. After 1956 the magazine was discontinued and the readers began to receive the magazine De Vrije Socialist.

In May 1965 the Provo movement was founded. Initiated by the anarchist philosopher Roel van Duijn, the non-smoking activist Robert Jasper Grootveld, Rob Stolk, Peter Bronkhorst and the inventor Luud Schimmelpennink. The Dutch monarchy and royalty, symbols of the establishment, were the preferred targets of the Provos' satirical attacks, as reflected in their magazine Provo. With their actions, the Provos gave anarchism new impetus and made it known to a wider public.

=== 21st century ===
Logo of the Dutch Antifascist Actie, with a red and black flag.

The Antifascist Actie (AFA) was founded in 1992 and is a supra-regional network of various groups. Among other things, their activities consist of demonstrations, the distribution of leaflets and support for other organizations. The organization is mainly supported by anarchists, in collaboration with socialists, communists and autonomists. Cooperation with left-wing unions was rejected. The AFA publishes the magazine Alert!.

The Eurodusnie collective was founded in 1997 to protest against the Treaty of Amsterdam.

The Anarchist Group Amsterdam (AGA) came into being around 2001. The anarchist group is a non-hierarchical collective. Their starting point was anarchism, where they looked for alternatives to problems that existed in society, for example in the workplace, in schools, the prison system and to take initiatives for tenants and the squatter movement. They emphasise self-organization and direct action. Anarchist groups also exist in other cities.

In 2009 the Anarchist Group Nijmegen (AGN) and in 2010 the Anarchist Collektief Utrecht (AK-Utrecht) was established. The groups organize actions and support each other's activities. The AGA shared a lot of their knowledge and experience. Both the AGN and the AK-Utrecht affiliated to the Free Union, an anarchist organization with groups in Utrecht, Amsterdam and Nijmegen, among other cities.

The Pinksterlanddagen, which has existed since 1924, is still being organized today.

The Federation of Free Socialists was founded in 1971, but later discontinued in 1979 and replaced by the Anarchist Federation. Anarchist Black Cross in Amsterdam and Nijmegen.

The Anarcho-syndicalist Union (Dutch: Anarcho-Syndicalistische Bond, ASB) was created in October 2012, on the initiative of some dissatisfied members of the Free Union. The ASB wanted a stronger focus on industrial action and had members in Utrecht, Twente, Amsterdam, Brabant, Rotterdam and The Hague. The ASB saw itself as a workers' organization with the aim of abolishing capitalism and the state, and in this sense followed a classic anarcho-syndicalist line. It pleaded for a free coexistence on the basis of self-organization of the workers, solidarity, mutual aid and communist anarchism. The ASB disbanded in 2014.

== See also ==
- Category:Dutch anarchists
- List of anarchist movements by region
- Christian democracy in the Netherlands
- Liberalism in the Netherlands
- Socialism in the Netherlands
- Squatting in the Netherlands
- Anarchism in Belgium
- Anarchism in Germany
