= Kabouters =

1970s Dutch anarchist organization

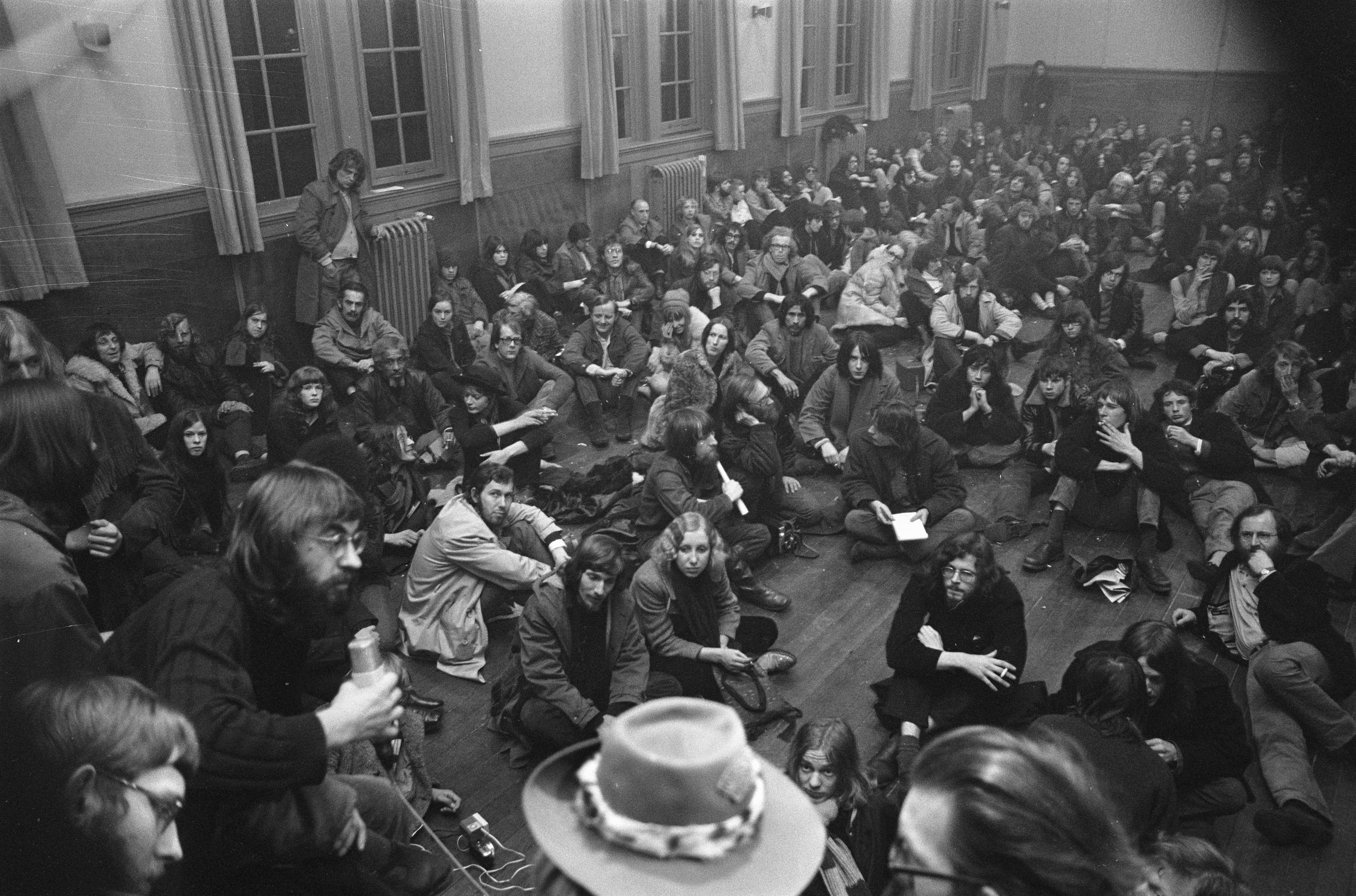
- Meeting of Kabouters in 1970
- Named after: Kabouter
- Predecessor: Provos
- Formation: 1969; 57 years ago
- Dissolved: 1974; 52 years ago
- Type: Protest movement
- Locations: Netherlands; Belgium
- Methods: Absurdism
- Key people: Robert Jasper Grootveld; Roel van Duijn; Frans Croes
- Website: kabouters.nu

Kabouters (English: Gnomes) were a Dutch anarchist group in the 1970s.

Provos, alongside Kabouters, spread an absurdist, "carnival anarchism" that used provocative tactics, humour, and direct action, to upend cultural norms.

== See also ==
- Green anarchism
- Luud Schimmelpennink
- Orange Alternative
- Witkar
