= Pinksterlanddagen =

Anarchist event in the Netherlands

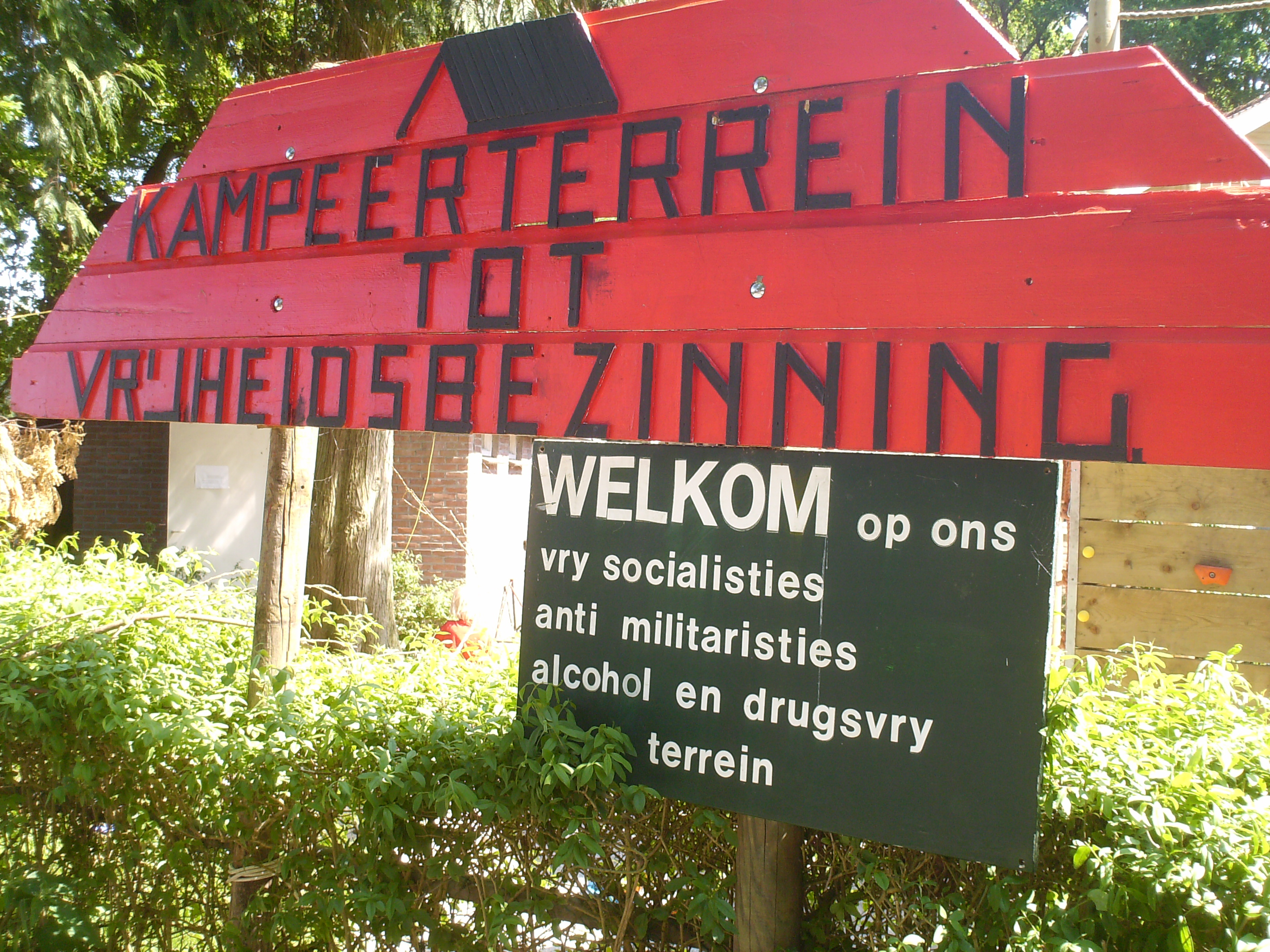
- Tot Vrijheidsbezinning in Appelscha
- Genre: Anarchist festival
- Frequency: Annual
- Locations: Appelscha, Friesland
- Coordinates: 52°57′08″N 06°19′46″E
- Years active: 102 years
- Inaugurated: 28 June 1924
- Most recent: 6 June 2025 – 8 June 2025
- Next event: 23 May 2026 – 25 May 2026
- Participants: 300
- Organiser: Foundation for the Freedom of Contemplation
- Website: pinksterlanddagen.org

The Pinksterlanddagen (Pentecost days) is the largest anarchist event in the Netherlands. It is a long tradition that goes back to 1924 when anarchist young people from Frisia organized this meeting for the first time. In 1933, the campground in Appelscha was bought by anti-militarist workers, and it is here that the festival has taken place ever since, every year during the Pentecost on the anarchist, alcohol-free camping site Tot Vrijheidsbezinning.

== History ==
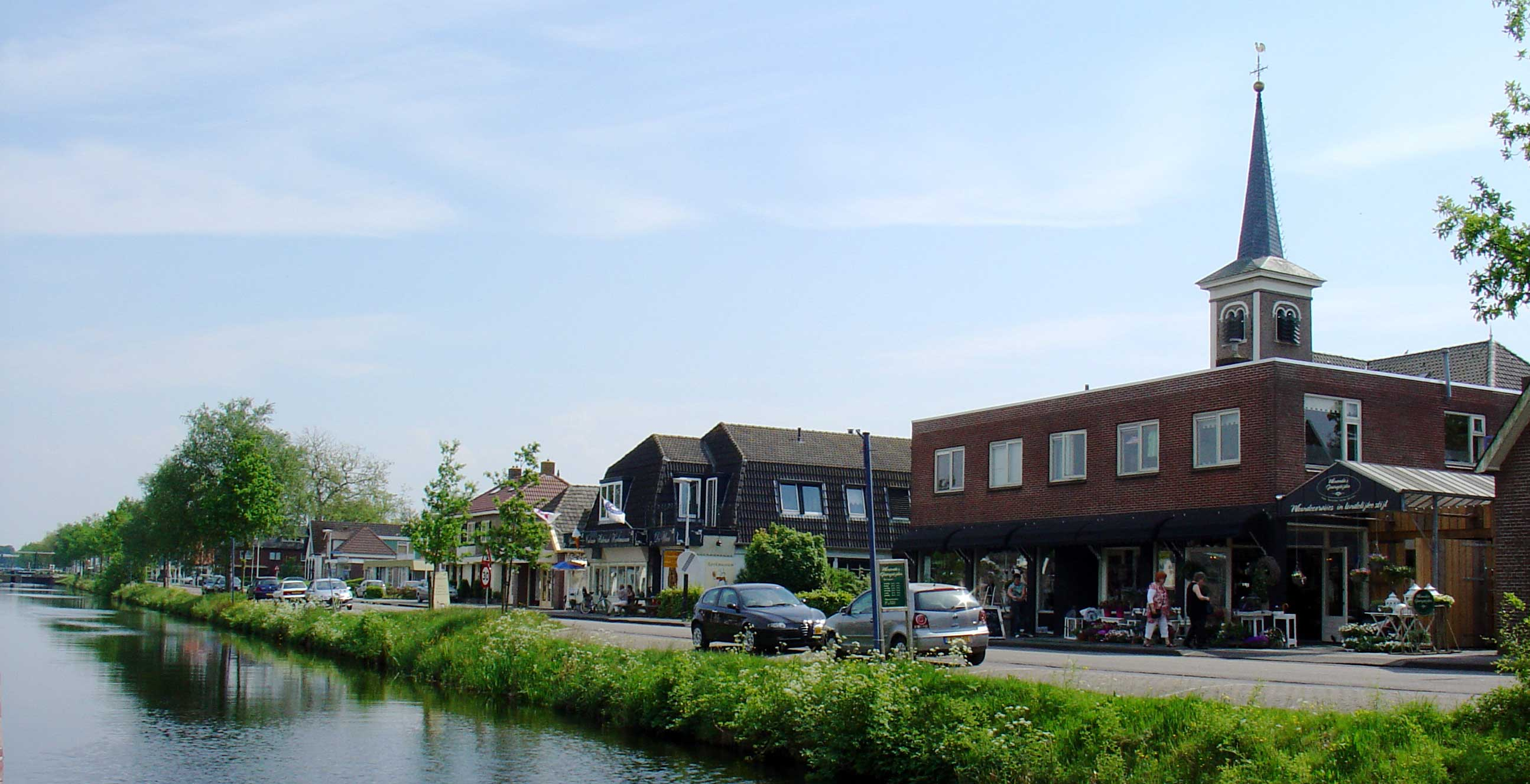
Appelscha

The Frisian town of Appelscha has a long tradition of radical revolutionary socialism and anarchism, which started on 30 March 1889 when the anarchist Ferdinand Domela Nieuwenhuis gave a speech to the village's dissatisfied workers. Here the combative agricultural workers formed the basis for the activities of Nieuwenhuis, workers strikes often took place in the village and around 1900 there was a large wave of strikes.

The local anarchist youth organized a Pinksterlanddagen event for the first time in 1924 on the Tot Vrijheidsbezinning site (literally: "For Freedom of Mind").

In 1970 the Provo Roel van Duijn attended the Pinksterlanddagen and organized a teach-in as the culmination of a propaganda manifestation for anarchism and for all anti-authoritarian movements in the Netherlands: pacifists, council communists, socialists and others.

=== Event ===
The group that organizes the Pinksterlanddagen, attaches importance to the fact that the visitors respect the freedoms of their fellow human beings. The initiative participants assume that all event participants feel jointly responsible as users of the site and have set up some rules for this: There are various containers for paper, glass and chemical waste in the village that should be used. There is also a container for normal waste in front of the site and a container for organic waste. No open fires on or around the campsite as there is a forest nearby. The site is accessible day and night, so make no noise at night. The terrain Tot Vrijheidsbezinning is antimilitaristic; alcohol and other drugs are not allowed. Energy saving measures should be observed. Other libertarian groups are also welcome. A large building is available for readings, events, workshops, meetings and more. Participation in the Pinksterlanddagen is not free of charge. There are also other tariffs for visitors who want to come before or after the Pinksterlanddagen event. The group "Rampeplan" (literally: Disaster Plan ) provides warm meals.

According to the anarchist-communist principle "From each according to their ability, to each according to their needs", leftover and well-preserved food items are put on a long table after the event, so they can be packed and taken away. Since the Pinksterlanddagen was founded, the events have been “alcohol-free”. Visitors are welcome all year round at the Tot Vrijheidsbezinning campsite, which is managed by a permanent employee.

== Bibliography ==
- Vries de Theun: The Wiarda Noorderzon family, "The wheel of fortune." In the chapter "Stepmother Earth" about the Pinksterland days and the "Domelapad" walking route. Em. Querido's Publisher, Amsterdam 1980, ISBN 90-214-1130-X.
- H .W. van den Doel: Places of memory. The Netherlands in the twentieth century . With Article von Henk te Velde über F.D. Nieuwenhuis und those Pentecost days . Promotheus / Bert Bakker, Amsterdam 2005, ISBN 90-351-2856-7.
- J. R. G. Schuur: Appelscha. Stronghold of Anarchism and Radical Socialism. ISBN 90-6466-082-4.
- A. J. Dijkstra: "Civitas Civics". Workbook. Garant, Antwerp / Apeldorn 2007, ISBN 978-90-441-2085-1, P. 37.
- In the State Archives by International Institute of Social History. Under: “Pinksterlanddagen”: Material magazines, pamphlets, program data, publications from the Netherlands. Period 1976-2006 . Organizations: GroenFront; Environmentally Active Youth (JMA); Anti-Fascist Action (AFA); Right for All; Animal Liberation Front (ALF).
- Ferdinand D. Nieuwenhuis and the Pinksterlanddagen. Chapter 2. "The Pentecostal Days and the Grounds for Reflection on Freedom."
