= Robert Jasper Grootveld =

Dutch artist

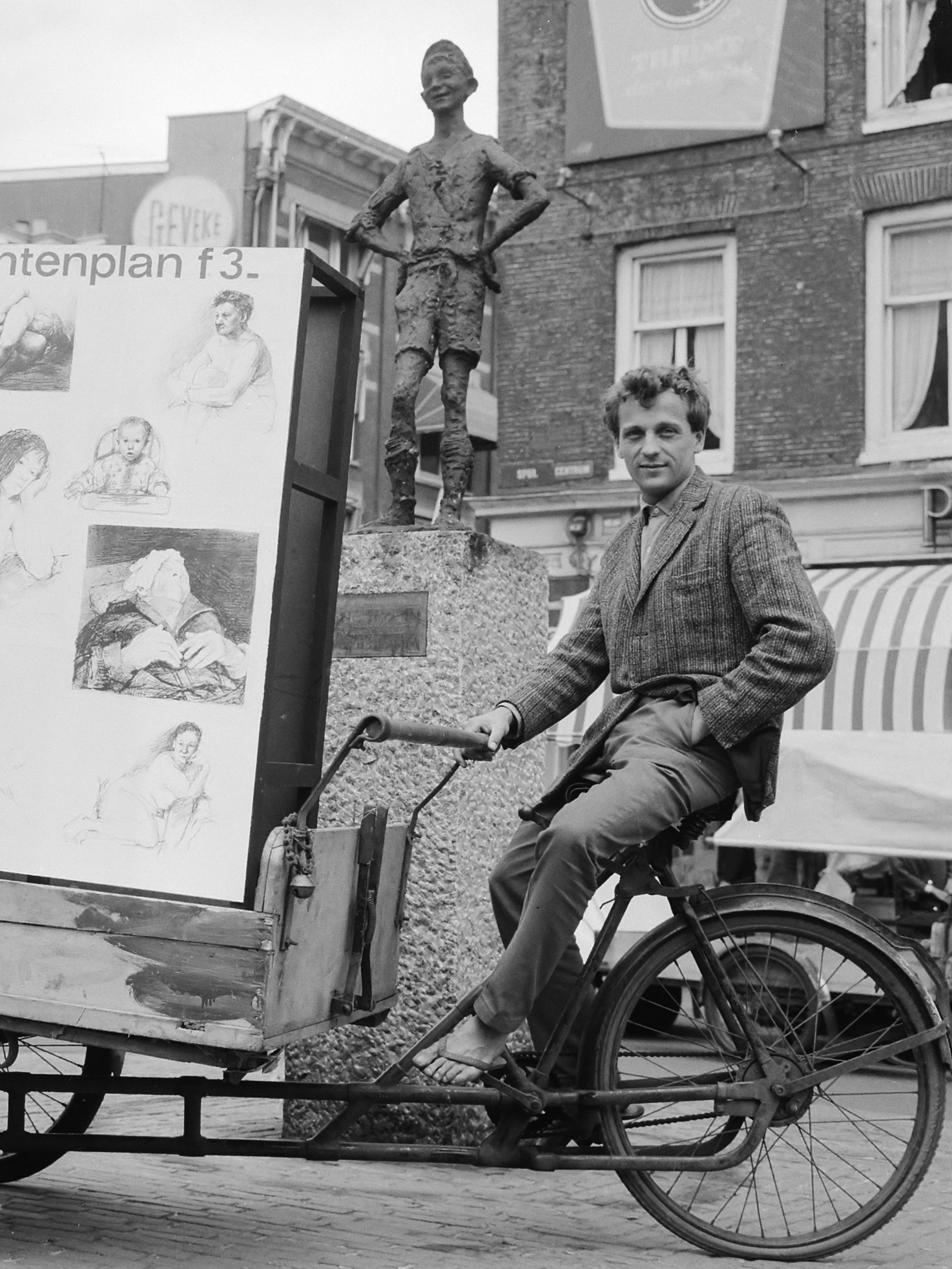
- Robert Jasper Grootveld in 1964
- Born: July 19, 1932; Amsterdam
- Died: February 26, 2009 (aged 76)
- Resting place: Zorgvlied
- Notable work: Klaas komt graffiti
- Movement: Kabouters; Provo
- Father: Frits Grootveld

Robert Jasper Grootveld (19 July 1932 – 26 February 2009) was a Dutch artist, best known for his events on the Spui in Amsterdam. Grootveld's 'happenings' were a forerunner of the Provo movement, which he later joined.

Grootveld was born in Amsterdam. From 1964 he staged anti-smoking Happenings at the Het Lieverdje (The Little Darling) statue in Amsterdam, after discovering that it had been donated to the city by a tobacco company. Grootveld would appear at midnight on Saturdays, strangely attired, and dance around the statue in a cloud of his own cigarette smoke, as he called all sorts of incantations. Uche, uche, uche and Klaas komt were his best known incantations, the last meaning "Klaas is Coming!" became familiar graffiti around the city. At the core of Grootveld's philosophy was the belief that the masses had been brainwashed into becoming a herd of addicted consumers.

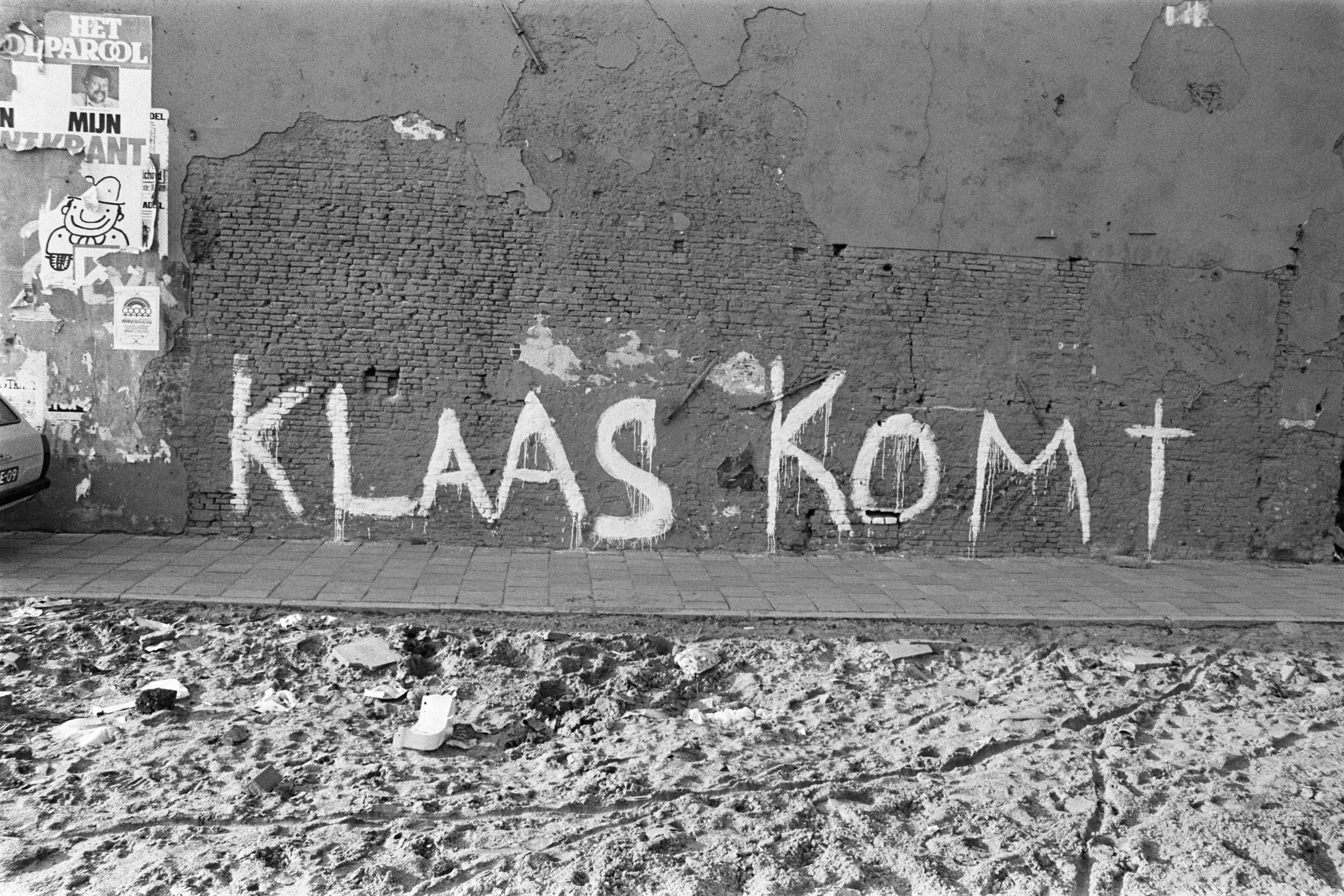
Grootveld’s Klaas komt graffiti in Amsterdam, 1977

Nozems, a Dutch subculture, were attracted to the street theatre as were some intellectuals inspired by Grootveld's innovative methods of communicating his message. One in particular, Roel van Duijn, observing the potential of street actions as provocations to alter society, began to distribute a magazine titled Provo at these events.
