= Drents-Friese Wold National Park =

Protected area in the Netherlands

- Nationaal Park Drents-Friese Wold
- IUCN category II (national park)
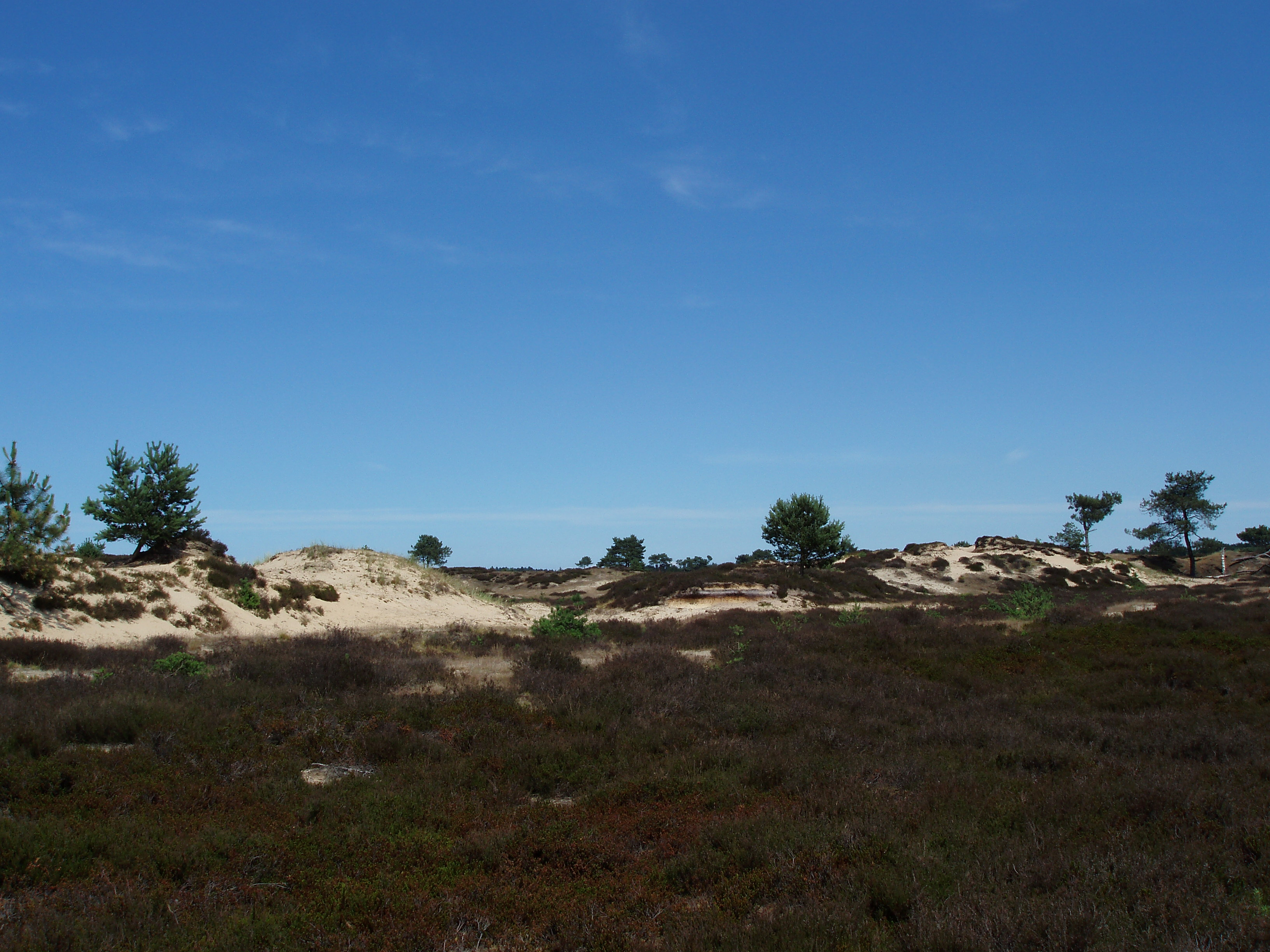
- Drents-Friese Wold National Park

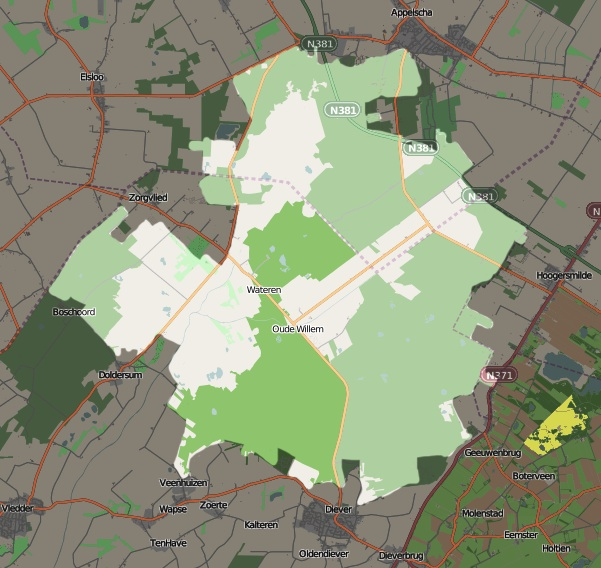
- Map of Drents-Friese Wold National Park
- Location: Friesland and Drenthe, Netherlands
- Nearest city: Appelscha
- Coordinates: 52.906°N 6.296°E
- Area: 61 km^{2} (24 mi^{2})
- Established: 2000
- Website: www.nationaalpark-drents-friese-wold.nl

The Drents-Friese Wold National Park is a national park in the Dutch provinces of Friesland and Drenthe, covering more than 61 km^{2} (24 mi^{2}), founded in 2000. It consists of forests, heath lands and drift-sands.

== Landscape and history ==
It is sure that people lived in this area already in the Stone Age. In the landscape several graves from that time are visible. The present characteristics of the area are strongly influenced by the 'esdorp culture'. Farmers used the lands for grazing by their sheep. The continuous removal of minerals resulted in heathlands and sand-drifts. In the 19th century, the state started forestry programmes, and such species as oak, pine, Douglas fir and Japanese larch were planted. These trees still cover a large part of the area. The brook Vledder Aa is one of the very few remaining natural brooks in the Netherlands.

== Vegetation and wildlife ==
In the national park we find among others the European pine marten (Martes martes), the Smooth snake (Coronella austriaca), the Great Crested Newt (Triturus cristatus), the Viviparous lizard (Zootoca vivipara), the Common Raven (Corvus corax), Stiff clubmoss (Lycopodium annotinum) and Bog-rosemary (Andromeda polifolia).

== Management ==
The most important management organisations for the park are:

- Staatsbosbeheer (State Forest Service), owns 4,150 hectares (10,300 acres).
- Natuurmonumenten (main Dutch private nature management organisation, owns 950 hectares (2,300 acres).
- Het Drentse Landschap (private provincial nature management organisation, owns 450 hectares (1,100 acres).
- Maatschappij van Weldadigheid (a 'society of beneficence'), owns 200 hectares (490 acres).

The rest of the park (400 hectares (990 acres)) is managed by 80 private owners.

== Recreation ==
The park contains many bike trails. In Appelscha, Hoogersmilde, and Diever are visitor and information centres.
