= Free Union (anarchist organisation) =

Free Union Vrije Bond
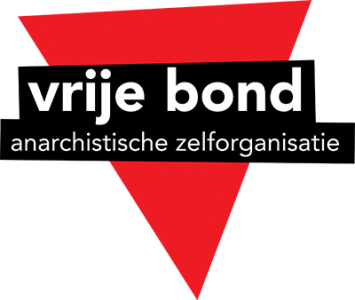
- Founded: 1990
- Split from: Business organisation Collective Sector (BCS), Independent Union of Business Organisations (OVB)
- Newspaper: Outside the Order
- Ideology: Anarchism
- Political position: Far-Left
- Colours: Red black
- Slogan: "Anarchist self-organization"

Website
- www.vrijebond.org

The Free Union or Free League (Dutch: Vrije Bond) is an anarchist organisation in the Netherlands and Belgium that was founded in 1990. The Free Union originated from the Business organization Collective Sector (BCS) and the Independent Union of Business Organizations (OVB) in the 1980s.

== Ideology ==
When the Free Union was founded, it initially presented itself as "the base organization for self-management and syndicalism", but has recently become less syndicalist and now presents itself as an anarchist organization. In its own words, the Vrije Bond strives for "an anarchist society in which a person can determine how to organize life." The Free Union aims at the abolition of social classes, borders, the state, and other social relations they deem oppressive. The Free Union advocates equality between people, the autonomy of the individual, and self-management and self-governance. Additionally, the Free Union is an ecological organisation and advocates a "good environment and vital nature."

The Free Union is an internationalist organisation, and therefore maintains relations with global anarchist groups and federations.

== Structure ==
The Free Union is based on equal participation and consequently every member is allowed to participate in the decision-making process. The Free Union consists of individual members and constituent autonomous groups. There are Free Union groups in Amsterdam, Utrecht, Nijmegen, Antwerp, and Ghent. The Vrije Bond and affiliated groups have several hundred members and govern themselves using participatory democracy.

The Free Union was an observer member of the International of Anarchist Federations. The Free Union cooperates, maintains relations with, or operates alongside various other far-left grassroots organisations such as the Anarcho-Syndicalist Union (ASB), Doorbraak (Breakthrough), the International Communist Current, the Union of Polish Syndicalists and the German Free Workers' Union, as well as occasionally the International Socialists despite an ambivalent relation.

== Activities ==
The Free Union uses direct action to further their goals. The Free Union is involved in issues such as ecology, migration, and workplace conflicts. The Vrije Bond organize among local, immigrant, and foreign workers. They also organize workshops, libraries and picket lines, and publish a periodical called Buiten de Orde (Outside the Order).

In September 2011, the Free Union organized a demonstration against the policies of the First Rutte cabinet that attracted 1500 people.

On 31 March 2012, the Free Union participated in the "European action day against capitalism" with a demonstration in Utrecht that mobilized several hundred people.

During the 2012 Dutch general election, an 'anti-election campaign' was initiated by the Free Union.

The Free Union also participates in the annual May Day and Pinksterlanddagen celebrations.

== See also ==
- Anarchism by country
- National Labor Secretariat, an earlier Dutch anarcho-syndicalist organization.
- Socialist Party, an earlier Dutch party with Anarchist inclinations.
- Syndicalist Labour Union, an earlier anarcho-syndicalist labour union, split from de NAS.
