= Witkar =

1970s Dutch car-sharing project

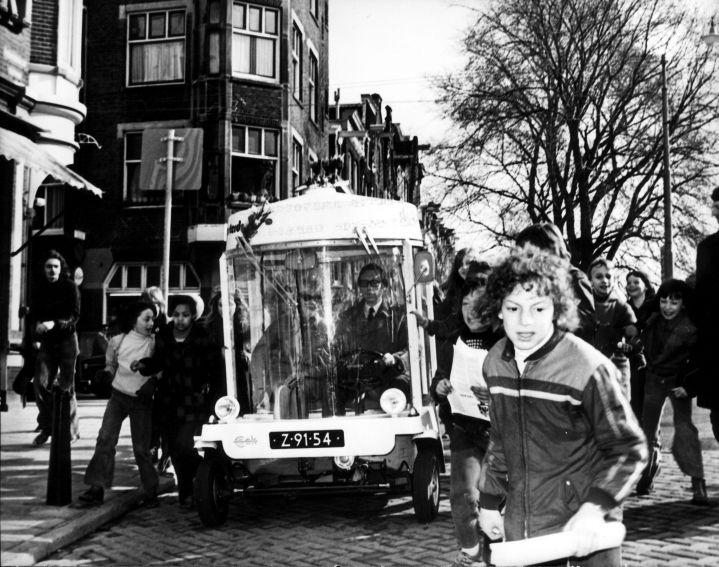
Transport minister Irene Vorrink and alderman Brautigam make the first trip in a Witkar on the Prinsengracht in Amsterdam on 21 March 1974.

The Witkar (Dutch, lit. 'white car' or 'white cart') was one of the first technology-based carsharing projects in the world. It is the invention of Dutch social inventor and politician Luud Schimmelpennink, an industrial designer and at the time Amsterdam city councillor. The project was opened by minister Irene Vorrink on 21 March 1974.

The first actual Witkar project took place in Amsterdam between 1974 and 1986. While it provided daily service for more than 4,000 registered users over those years, the project never got beyond the limited demonstration phase due to a lack of support by government.

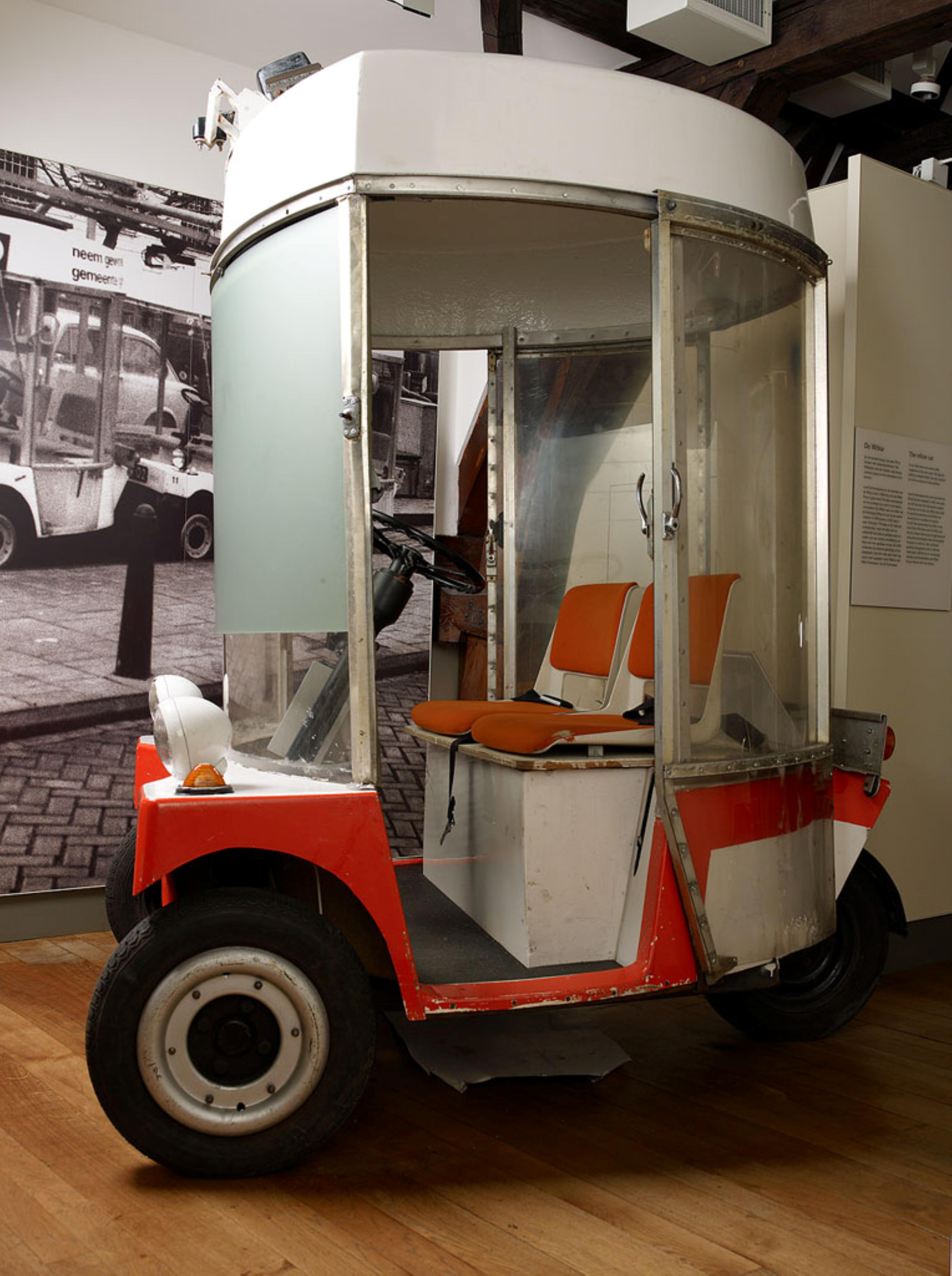
Witkar in Amsterdam Museum

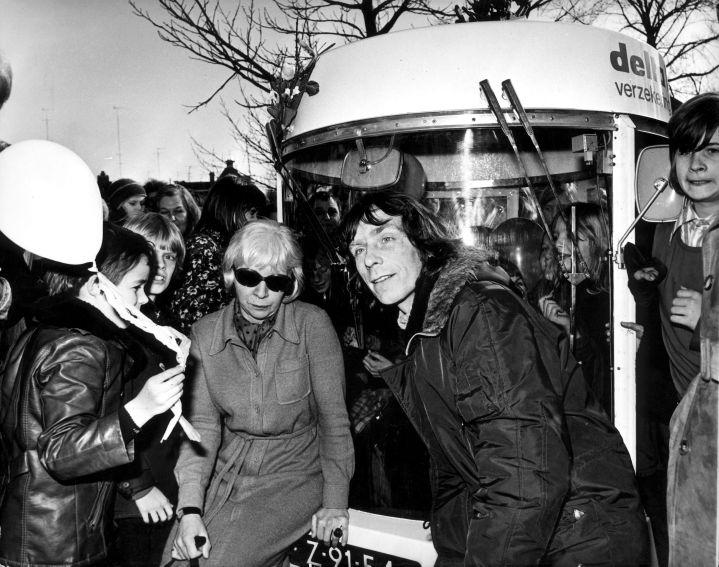
Minister Vorrink and Luud Schimmelpennink at the opening of the first Witkar station on the Amstelveld in Amsterdam on 21 March 1974.

The system was initially conceived in 1969 by Schimmelpennink in order to reduce traffic in central Amsterdam, but it failed to win the support of the City Council and was spun off to be developed by a specially formed co-operative society. The co-operative managed to raise loans of US$250,000 for the first phase through 1974. This included the design and construction of the vehicles, the purchase of a PDP-11 minicomputer for the central control system, development of the control software, and construction of the first 35 cars and five stations. A further 10 stations were scheduled for operation by the end of 1976, by which time the fleet was to have been extended to 100 vehicles. The ultimate target was 150 stations and 1,000 vehicles, but as a result of lack of government support this never happened.

The core of the Witkar concept is that of people sharing small environmentally-acceptable vehicles specially designed for urban use. It was seen by Schimmelpennink and his team as a way to wean people away from conventional car ownership and use, on the grounds that such vehicles have no place in densely settled cities.

These were specially designed electric vehicles. They had two seats, and offered little luxury. They were very easy to recognize. The vehicles were located around the city in pods. In Amsterdam 35 of these cars were available to hire from five stations in the city centre. The original system was designed for fully automatic control, including direct debit of hirers' accounts at the Amsterdam Savings Bank.

The idea was that any person could take a Witkar, and leave it at the Witkar station closest to their destination. The initiators thought that the flow of traffic to and from these stations would allow for an even spread of Witkarren (the Dutch plural of Witkar). The system actually operated. The problems were several: the vehicles needed long recharging times, so many were needed to have some on the road all the time. The biggest problem was that the flow of traffic was generally in one direction. As a result of this, some stations were always full, and others always empty. To correct this by moving Witkarren would have caused extra traffic.

In January 2007, Schimmelpennink and his associates planned a new Witkar program for Amsterdam, where he had recently (March 2006) been re-elected to the Municipal Council. On April 3, 2017, the 82-year old Luud Schimmelpennink received the 'Frans Banninck Cocq' medal from the alderman of transportation in Amsterdam, Pieter Litjens.

== See also ==
- Car-free movement
- Sustainable transport
- Paratransit
- Shared transport
- Sustainable city
- White Plans
- Zipcar
