= Nozem =

Rebellious youth in the Netherlands during the 1950s and 1960s

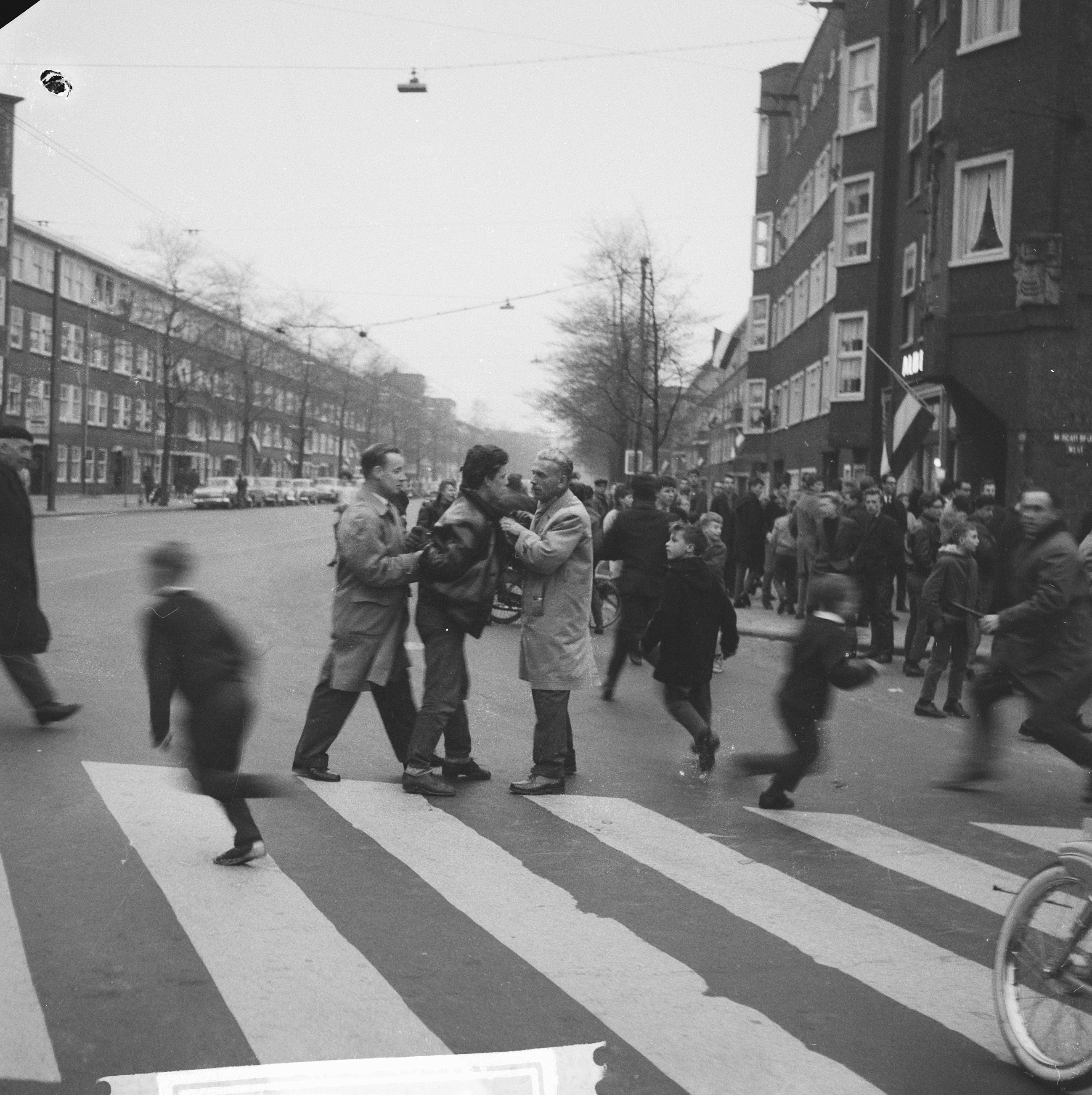
- A Nozem youth is arrested in Amsterdam after disrupting the Remembrance of the Dead, 4 May 1962
- Years active: 1950s–1960s
- Country: Holland
- Influenced: Provos

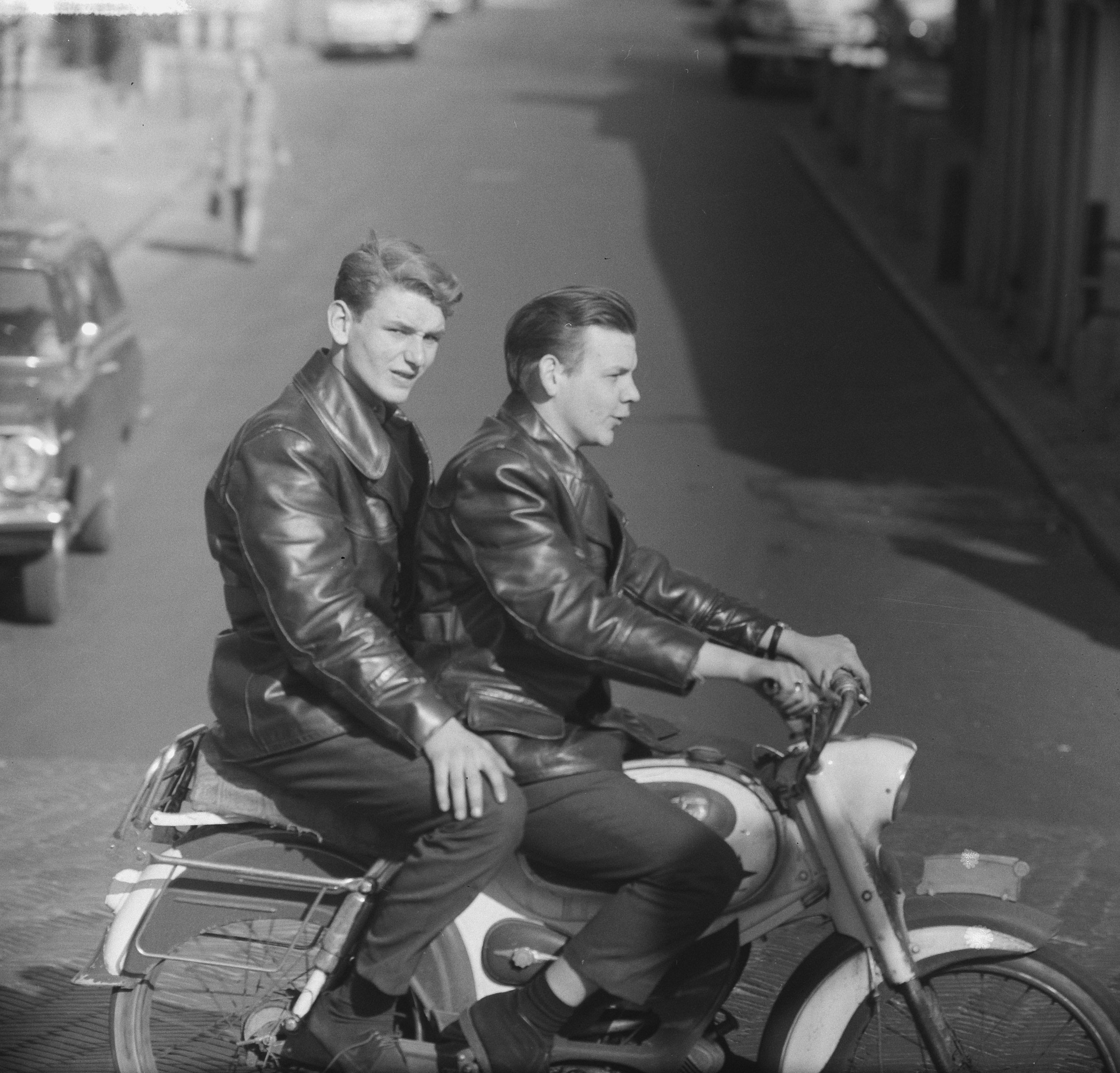
Nozems on a moped.

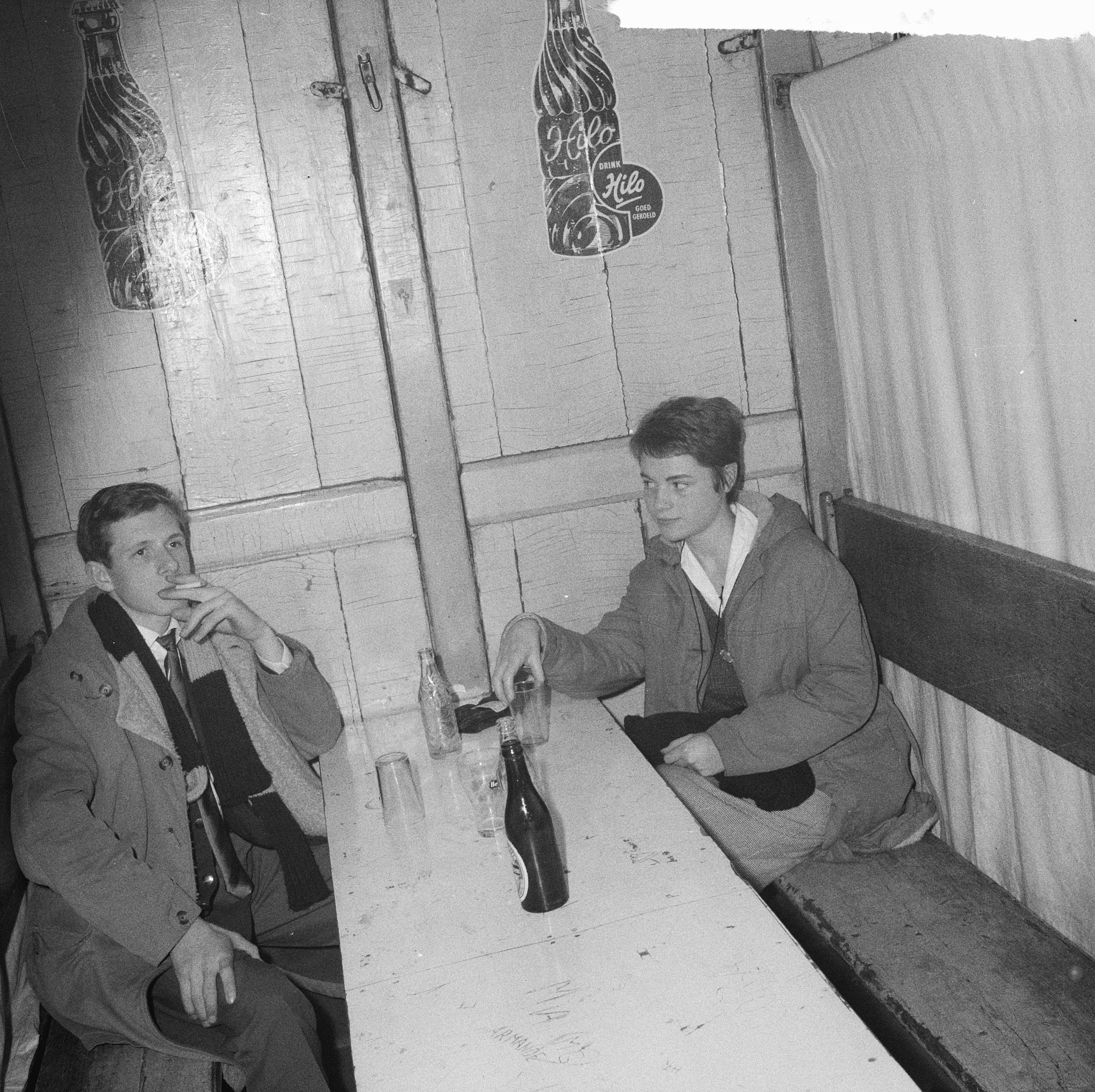
A Nozem couple, 26 December 1960

Nozem (Dutch pronunciation: [ˈnoːzəm]) was a term during the 1950s and 1960s to describe self-conscient, rebellious youth, often aggressive and considered problematic by authorities in the Netherlands. It was the earliest modern Dutch subculture, related to the Teddy Boy movement in the UK and the greasers in the United States. It was followed by the Provos.

Nozems were young people who dressed in jeans and leather jackets, listened to rock 'n' roll, and gathered near snack bars on their mopeds. Their hairstyle was characterised by a styled, greased quiff.

The term nozem is believed to derive from the Bargoens cant word penoze ("underworld"), which in turn derives from Yiddish. In 1965 the influential anarchist inspired Provo movement emerged from the nozem subculture.
