= Luud Schimmelpennink =

Dutch inventor

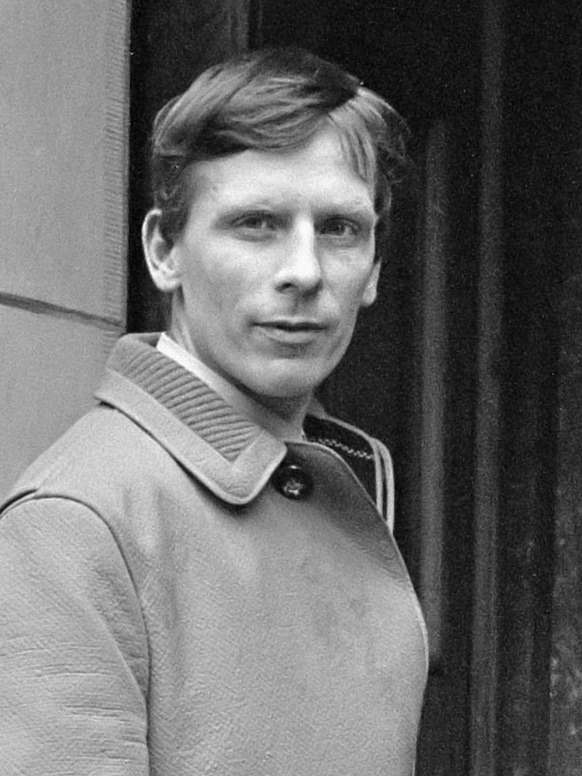
- Schimmelpennink in 1967
- Born: Laurens Maria Hendrikus Schimmelpennink; 1935 (age 90–91); Amsterdam
- Era: Post-war
- Employer: Werkspoor
- Known for: White Bicycle Plan
- Notable work: Witkar
- Title: Amsterdam City Councilor
- Term: March 1967 - June 1968
- Predecessor: Bernhard de Vries
- Successor: Irène van de Weetering
- Political party: Onafhankelijk Politiek Actief
- Other political affiliations: PvdA
- Movement: Provo

Luud Schimmelpennink (born in Amsterdam, 27 May 1935) is a Dutch social inventor, industrial designer, entrepreneur and politician. As of 2007 he is Managing Director of the Ytech Innovation Centre in Amsterdam. Schimmelpennink first came into public view in the early 1960s through his association with the Dutch Provo counterculture and the White Bicycle Plan.

Since the mid-1960s Schimmelpennink has been active as an industrial designer and social innovator, with special focus on sustainable transportation concepts. His work aims to both reduce the number of conventional motor cars in cities or urban areas for environmental and public health reasons, and provide people with viable alternative means of getting around in the city.

== White Bicycle Plan ==
Luud Schimmelpennink emerged on the Dutch social political scene as the main person behind the famous 1965 White Bicycle Plan in Amsterdam, whereby he and colleagues collected several hundred bikes, painted them white, and left them around the city to be freely used. This initiative, called the White Bicycle Plan, originally existed as one in a series of White Plans proposed in the street magazine and youth movement Provo. The Dutch Provos were, by the standards of the times, a radical group that thought to provoke the establishment with playful demonstrations.

On 22 February 1967 Schimmelpennink was elected to the Municipal Council of the City of Amsterdam, but was unable to get the needed political support for his White Bicycle Plan. However, the basic model that Schimmelpennink and his colleagues created became an inspiration and model for Community bicycle programs which today are gaining serious momentum in a growing number of European cities, including Helsinki, Copenhagen, Amsterdam, Lyons and Villeurbanne.

=== Latest White Bicycle system design summary ===
Schimmelpennink’s updated White Bicycle system is supported by a patented smart card technology intended to counter misuse. The integrated access, parking and control systems discourages theft, and the bicycles are immediately identifiable due to their unusual design. Registered users can access the White Bicycles in a network of unmanned parking lots around the city. Such parking lots are equipped with a main console and have racks that hold up to ten bikes. When a club member inserts a card with an embedded microchip into the console, they are asked to identify their final destination and at that time book the use of a bicycle for thirty minutes. The central computer identifies the user and makes a reservation for them at a free parking slot near their indicated destination point. The cyclist then has half an hour to get from point A to point B and deposit the bike as programmed. This is the basic structure of the Lyons bicycle project and others that have come on line in the last few years. Schimmelpennink has freely contributed his knowledge to such initiatives.

== Witkar ==
In the mid-1960s, Schimmelpennink started work on another concept, the Witkar. Designed as environmentally friendly, non-polluting, safe, low speed city transport, the Witkar is a small three-wheeled electric shared car. The car is white, the name meaning White Car in Dutch. The initiative was one of the first working carshare projects in the world using specially developed technology and a formal carshare operational program. The Witkar was available on a subscription basis to certified members of an otherwise open public subscriber group. The Witkar cooperative opened to its users on 24 May 1968, and while it failed to get the political support needed to become a full scale, permanent part of the city’s transport landscape, it continued to offer service for its members until on October 27, 1986 when it was decided by the Witkar-association to dissolve itself.

== Industrial design ==
As an industrial designer, Schimmelpennink's contributions include new bicycle designs, hardware and software systems to support vehicle sharing and fleet management, and the latest version of the White Bicycle concept - the Smart-card supported Depo/White Bicycle system with a new Witkar city carshare system presently under development.

== Political positions ==
In 2002 and again in 2006, he was elected to the Municipal District Council of Amsterdam Centrum, this time as a member of the Dutch Labor (Social Democrat) party PvdA. Schimmelpennink is currently working on a new Witkar-type project for Amsterdam as well as continuing to promote community cycles in Amsterdam and elsewhere.

== See also ==
- Amsterdam
- Bicycle
- Bicycle culture
- Car-free
- Carsharing
- Community bicycle program
- Cycling in the Netherlands
- Cycling
- Dutch politics
- Fietsvierdaagse
- Green transport
- Paratransit
- Provo (movement)
- Shared transport
- Sustainable city
- Sustainable transportation
- Vélo'v
- Witkar
