= Provo (movement) =

1960s Dutch countercultural movement

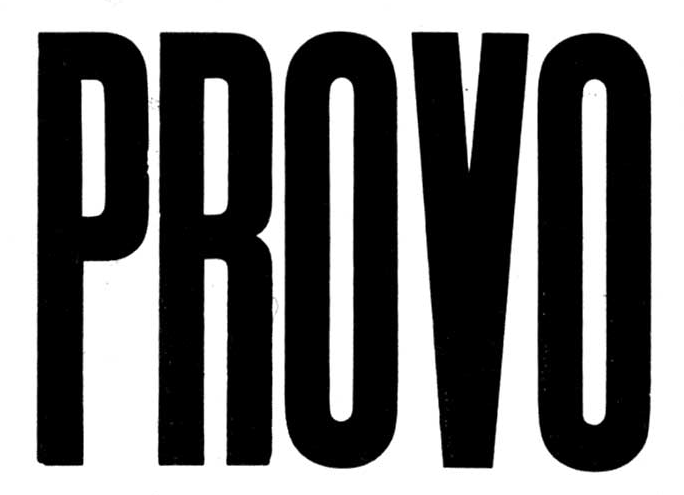

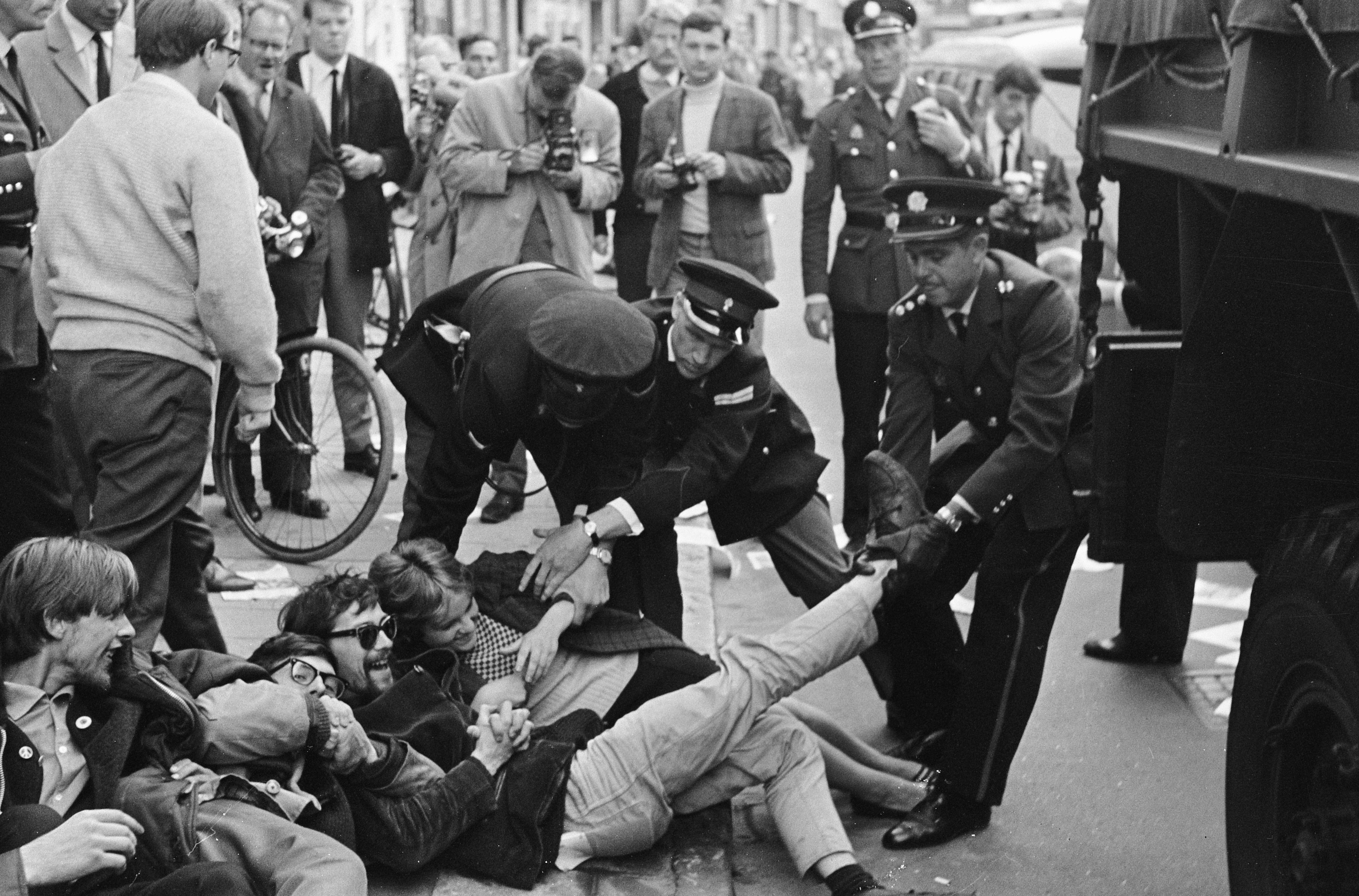
- Hans Tuynman is arrested during a provo protest in opposition to United States involvement in the Vietnam War in Amsterdam, 17 July 1966
- Named after: Provoceren
- Predecessor: Nozem
- Successor: Kabouters
- Formation: 25 May 1965; 61 years ago
- Founders: Roel van Duijn; Robert Jasper Grootveld; Garmt Kroeze; Rob Stolk
- Dissolved: 1967; 59 years ago
- Type: Political movement
- Methods: Nonviolence
- Fields: Anarchism
- Publication: Provo

Provo was a Dutch counterculture movement in the mid-1960s that focused on provoking violent responses from authorities using non-violent bait. It was preceded by the nozem movement and followed by the hippie movement. Provo was founded on 25 May 1965 by Robert Jasper Grootveld, an anti-smoking activist, and the anarchists Roel van Duijn and Rob Stolk. The term was used for the movement as a whole and for individual members. Provo was officially disbanded on 13 May 1967.

== Magazine ==
On 12 July 1965, the first Provo magazine was published. It contained the "Provo manifesto", written by Roel van Duijn, and reprinted recipes for bombs from a nineteenth-century anarchist pamphlet. The magazine was eventually confiscated.

In issue 12 of Provo, the magazine was described as

a monthly sheet for anarchists, provos, beatniks, pleiners, scissors-grinders, jailbirds, simple simon stylites, magicians, pacifists, potato-chip chaps, charlatans, philosophers, germ-carriers, grand masters of the queen's horse, happeners, vegetarians, syndicalists, santy clauses, kindergarten teachers, agitators, pyromaniacs, assistant assistants, scratchers and syphilitics, secret police, and other riff-raff. Provo has something against capitalism, communism, fascism, bureaucracy, militarism, professionalism, dogmatism, and authoritarianism. Provo has to choose between desperation, resistance and submissive extinction. Provo calls for resistance wherever possible. Provo realises that it will lose in the end, but it cannot pass up the chance to make at least one more heartfelt attempt to provoke society. Provo regards anarchy as the inspirational source of resistance. Provo wants to revive anarchy and teach it to the young. Provo is an image.

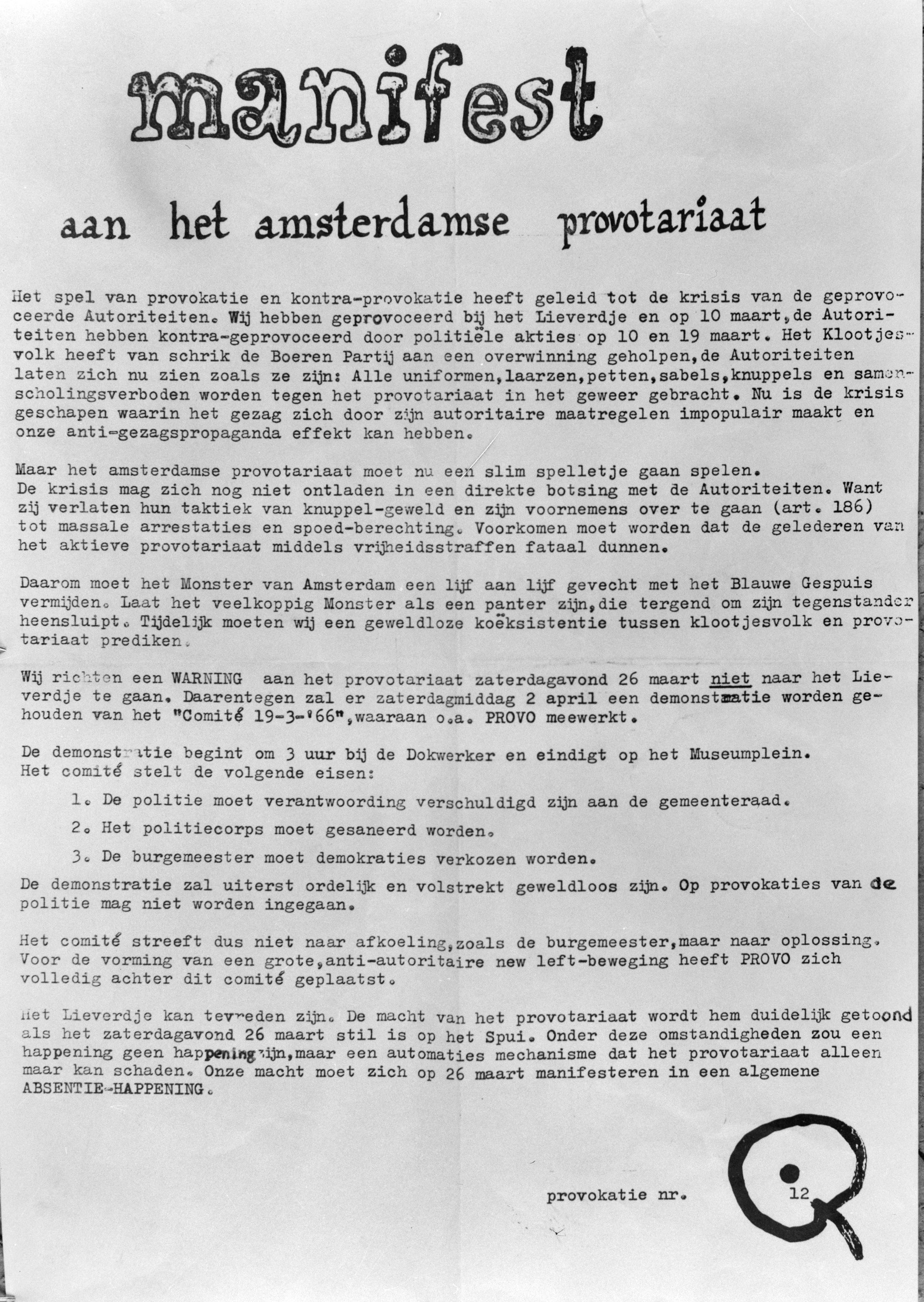
The Manifest provokatie nr. 12, 12 May 1966. Held in the Nationaal Archief

== The White Plans ==
The political wing of the Provos won a seat on the city council of Amsterdam, and developed the "White Plans". The most famous of those is the "White Bicycle Plan", which aimed to improve Amsterdam's transport problem. Generally the plans sought to address social issues in playful manner.

This is a list of the White Plans:

- White Bicycle Plan: initiated by Luud Schimmelpenninck, the plan proposed the closing of central Amsterdam to all motorised traffic, including motorbikes, with the intention of improving public transport frequency by more than 40% and to save two million guilders per year. Taxis were accepted as semi-public transport, but would have to be electrically powered and have a maximum speed of 25 m.p.h. The Provos proposed one of the first bicycle sharing systems: the municipality would buy 20,000 white bikes per year, which were to be public property and free for everybody to use. After the plans were rejected by the city authorities, the Provos decided to go ahead anyway. They painted 50 bikes white and left them on streets for public use. The police impounded the bikes, as they violated municipal law forbidding citizens to leave bikes without locking them. After the bikes had been returned to the Provos, they equipped them all with combination locks and painted the combinations on the bicycles. (The song "My White Bicycle" by the English psychedelic rock band Tomorrow, later covered by Nazareth and by Nigel Planer, was inspired by the White Bicycle plan.)
- White Chimney Plan: proposed that air polluters be taxed and the chimneys of serious polluters be painted white.
- White Women Plan: proposed a network of clinics offering advice and contraceptives, mainly for the benefit of women and girls, and with the intention to reduce unwanted pregnancies. The plan was for girls of sixteen to be invited to visit the clinic, and advocated for schools to teach sex education. The White Women Plan also argued that it is irresponsible to enter marriage as a virgin.
- White Chicken Plan: a proposal for the reorganization of the Amsterdam police (called "kip" in Dutch slang, meaning "chicken"). Under the plan, the police would be disarmed and placed under the jurisdiction of the municipal council rather than of the burgemeester (mayor). Municipalities would then be able to democratically elect their own chief of police. The Provos intended for this revised structure to transform the police from guard to social worker.
- White Housing Plan: sought to address Amsterdam's acute housing problem by banning speculation in house building, and by promoting the squatting of empty buildings. The plan envisioned Waterlooplein as an open-air market and advocated abandoning plans for a new town hall.
- White Kids Plan: proposed shared parenting in groups of five couples. Parents would take turns to care for the group's children on a different day of the week.
- White Victim Plan: proposed that anyone having caused death while driving would have to build a warning memorial on the site of the traffic collision by carving the victim's outline one inch deep into the pavement and filling it with white mortar.
- White Car Plan: a car-sharing project, proposed by Schimmelpennink, featuring electric cars that could be used by the people. It was later realised in a limited fashion as the Witkar system from 1974 until 1986.

== End ==
Tensions with the police peaked in June 1966, when the construction worker Jan Weggelaar died during a demonstration. A strike was called by construction workers and large numbers of workers and their sympathisers, including Provos, marched through Amsterdam. Demonstrators fought the police in the streets (on the Dam and Damrak) and attacked the offices and vehicles of De Telegraaf.

At the same time, the Provos participated in left-wing student protests against the Vietnam War. Demonstrations were banned, resulting in an increase in their size and popularity. The police responded with increasing force, and by mid-1966 hundreds of arrests were made every week. Police brutality led to increasing sympathy for the Provos and the anti-war demonstrators among the general public. An official investigation into the crisis was opened.

These events eventually led to the dismissal of Amsterdam's police chief, H. J. van der Molen, in 1966 and the resignation of mayor Gijsbert van Hall in 1967. After van Hall had been removed, Grootveld and Rob Stolk (printer of Provo magazine) decided to end Provo. Stolk said: "Provo has to disappear because all the Great Men that made us big have gone", a reference to Provo's two arch-enemies, Van Hall and Van der Molen.

== Influence ==
Many Provo groups emerged in other cities in Belgium, Italy, the Netherlands and the US. Stockholm staged an anti-nuclear war happening/action under the name Provies. In London a "Death and Rebirth of International Times" happening, after a police raid of the first UK underground paper, was seen as a Provo event.

== See also ==
- Kabouters
- Orange Alternative
- Situationist International
- Witkar
