= Appelscha =

- Village
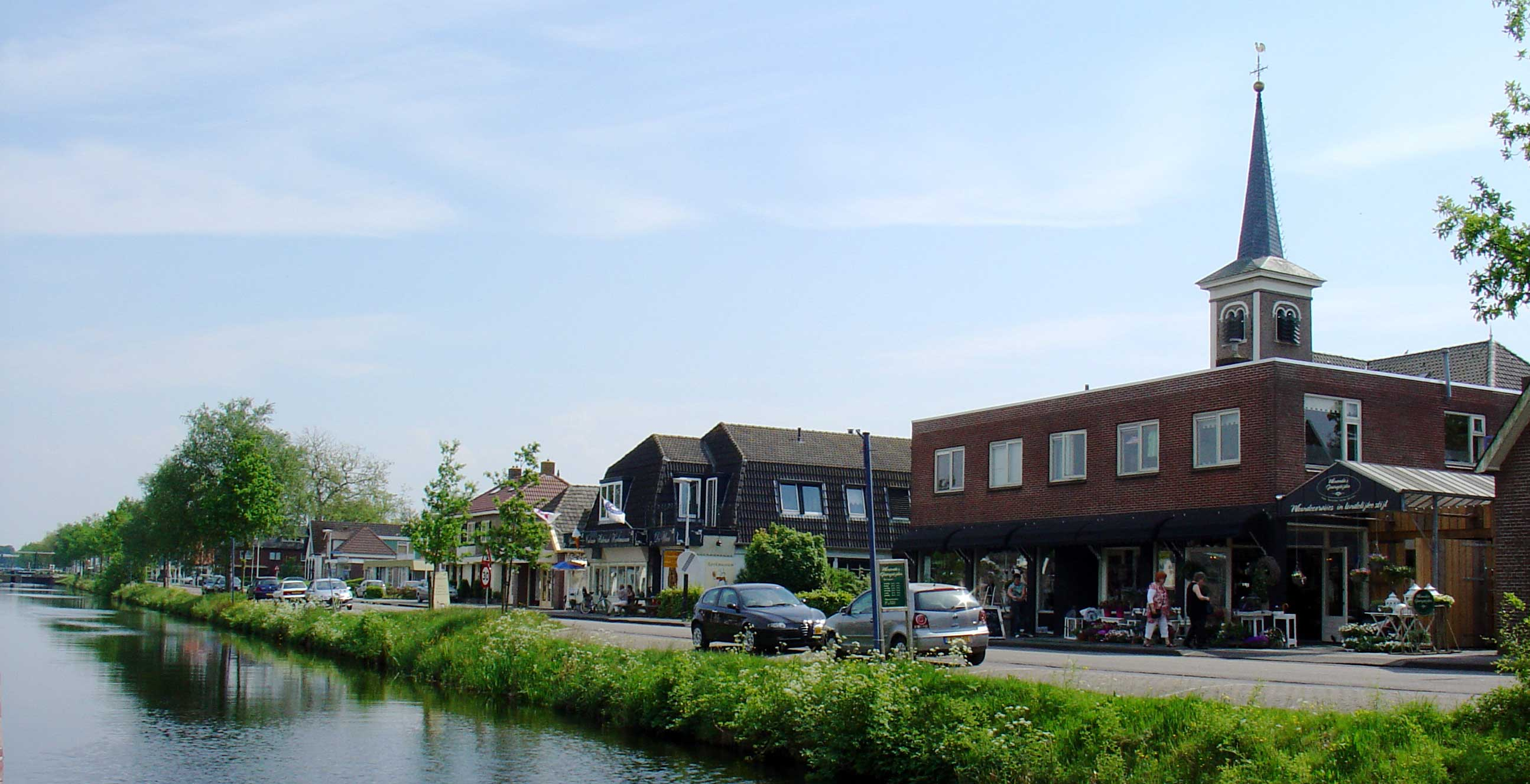
- Appelscha along the Opsterlandse Compagnonsvaart

- Flag Coat of arms

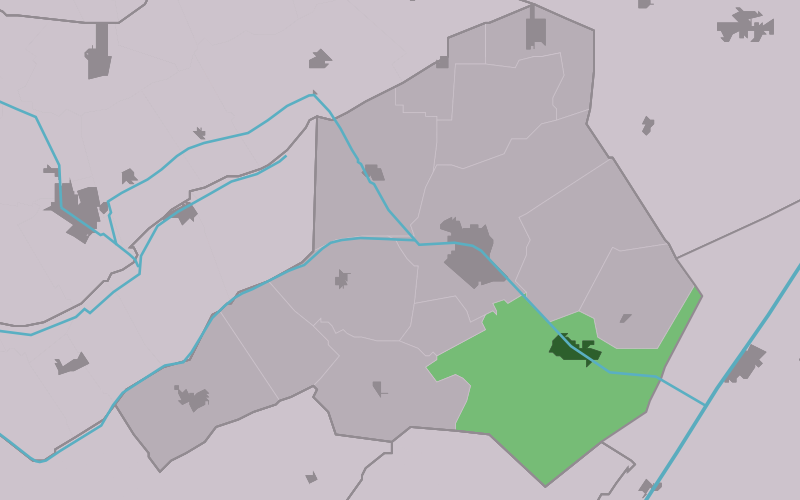
- Location in the Ooststellingwerf municipality

- Location in the Netherlands Appelscha (Netherlands)
- Coordinates: 52°57′57″N 6°25′15″E
- Country: Netherlands
- Province: Friesland
- Municipality: Ooststellingwerf

Area
  - Total: 39.54 km^{2} (15.27 sq mi)
- Elevation: 9 m (30 ft)

Population (1 January 2021)
  - Total: 4,775
  - Density: 120.8/km^{2} (312.8/sq mi)
- Time zone: UTC+1 (CET)
  - Summer (DST): UTC+2 (CEST)
- Postal code: 8426
- Dialing code: 0516

Appelscha (West Frisian: Appelskea; Stellingwarfs: Appelsche) is a village in the municipality of Ooststellingwerf in the province of Friesland, Netherlands. It has just under 4,800 inhabitants.

== History and background ==
Appelscha is a village of about 490 hectares in size of which 8 hectares consists of water, it was first named in written documents in 1247 as Appels, which is a Dutch word meaning apples. The last part of the name Appelscha has its origin due to the woods around the village. ‘Sche’ or ‘scha’ means woods and was therefore added to the name of the village. It consisted from a few farms surrounding the Boerestreek (what was called high-Appelscha) for centuries, the hamlets Aakinga, Terwisscha and De Built close by. Appelscha remained a small village, tucked away between sand dunes and wet peat. In 2007, Oude Willem, a small natural area in between Appelscha and Zorgvlied was even chosen as "most beautiful place in the Netherlands" by readers of HP/De Tijd which is a magazine in the Netherlands.

== Sand and peat ==
Around 1450 dikes were constructed to ensure the acid leakwater from the peat returned to the fields. The old Appelscha suffered much drifting sand from the dunes. In 1881, people therefore started with the construction of the forest. After 1827, the village extends with the advent of thousands of Frisian workers for peat extraction, and the modern village was created. The social conditions were however, very poor. By the time peat yielded much less than coal, a huge strike broke out (1888). Because of this large immigration of Frisian workers in the nineteenth century, Appelscha became a Frisian-speaking village, in a municipality where otherwise Stellingwarfs was spoken, a dialect of Dutch.

== Sanatorium Beatrixoord ==
In 1922, the Friesch Volkssanatorium from Joure transferred to Appelscha. Many thousands of patients spent years in the huge forest to try to cure their tuberculosis. Today only the X-ray department of the sanatorium is left. This is the only tuberculosis museum in the world.

== Surroundings and tourism ==
Appelscha is located at the northern edge of the 61-square-kilometre Drents-Friese Wold National Park, which is one of the biggest nature reserves in the Netherlands, located on the boundary of the provinces Friesland and Drenthe. The forest and the sand dunes around the village attract tourists to Appelscha, and have become known in the Netherlands for their natural environment. There are restaurants and weekend markets during the summer in the Boerestreek, which used to be the tourist center of the village. Many other attractions at the Boerestreek also attracted tourists in the past, including an amusement park ‘Duinenzathe’ and a miniature park. The amusement park moved to the edge of the village in 1997 after the municipality planned to redevelop the Boerestreek. The miniature park closed in October 2002 after decreasing numbers of visitors following the redevelopment.

Due to its history as a peat producing village, Appelscha is located along the Opsterlandse Compagnonsvaart, the canal that flows through the village and connects it to surrounding villages. Nowadays this canal is a popular tourist route for boaters, attracting a large number of visitors to Appelscha every year. In 2012, 11 per cent of short domestic holidays, and 13 per cent of long domestic holidays by the Dutch people were spent in the area on the Groningse, Friese, and Drentse sand dunes, of which Appelscha is part (CBS, tourism and recreation in 2012). As well as boating, Appelscha has a couple of campgrounds, of which RCN De Roggeberg is the largest. Customers of this campground in the summer month have free use of the ‘Bosbad Appelscha’, a large open-air swimming pool next to the campground, surrounded by the woods.

Since 2007 the village has had a nine-hole golf course with 1,944 metres of fairways at the Golf Resort De Hildenberg. The resort also has 129 villas for rent, which are near the Bosbad Appelscha.

For more adventurous visitors, Appelscha has an adventure park called ‘Klimbos Appelscha’. At this park in a forest near the Boerestreek, there are climbing trails from tree to tree at heights from four to 14 meters (13 to 45 feet). Starting from the central platform adventurers are able to choose from trails requiring different skill levels.

== World War II ==
In the last days of World War Two, the area was the site of a sharp battle between German forces and the Free French, combined with the Canadian forces, as part of Operation Amherst.

== Community ==
Appelscha’s inhabitants consist of about 50% men and 50% women. The largest group representing 32% of the population is in the age of 45–64. The smallest age group is in the age of 15–24 years which makes its population age quite old on average. 47% of its inhabitants are married while only 7% is divorced. Another 7% is widowed.

Population

- 1954 - 3.331
- 1959 - 3.367
- 1964 - 3.113
- 1969 - 3.333
- 1974 - 3.547
- 2009 - 5.123

== Notable people ==
- Theun Busser (born 1952), speed skater

== Gallery ==
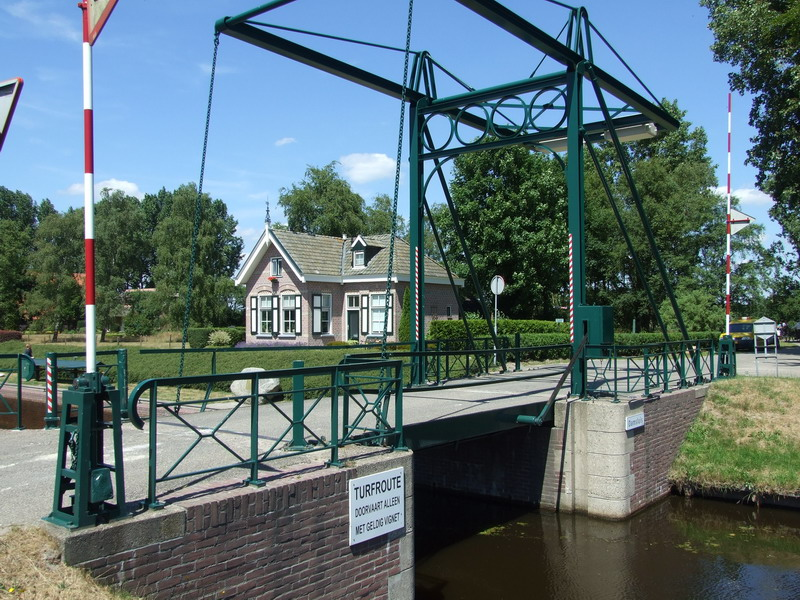
Sluice in Appelscha

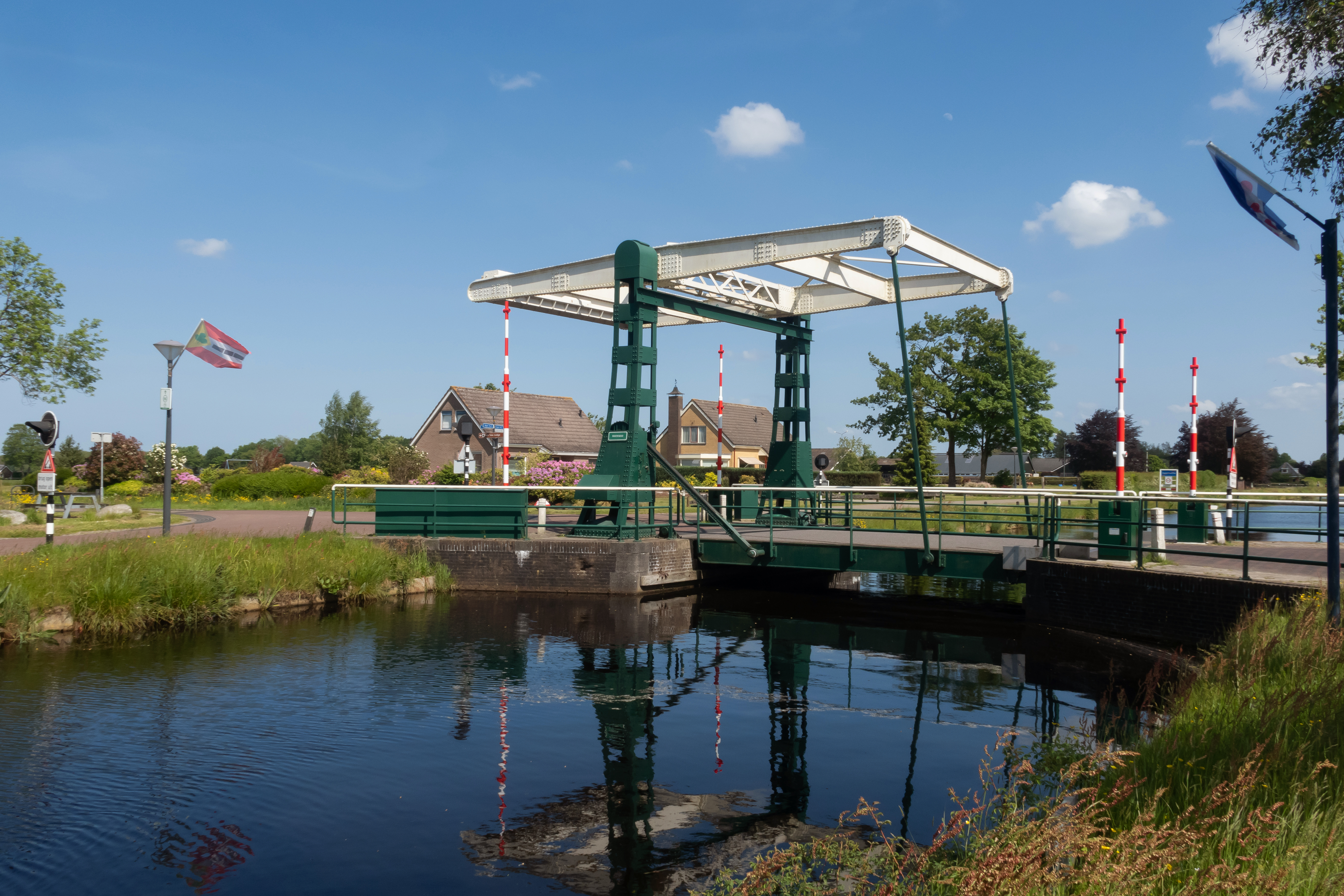
Drawbridge in Appelscha

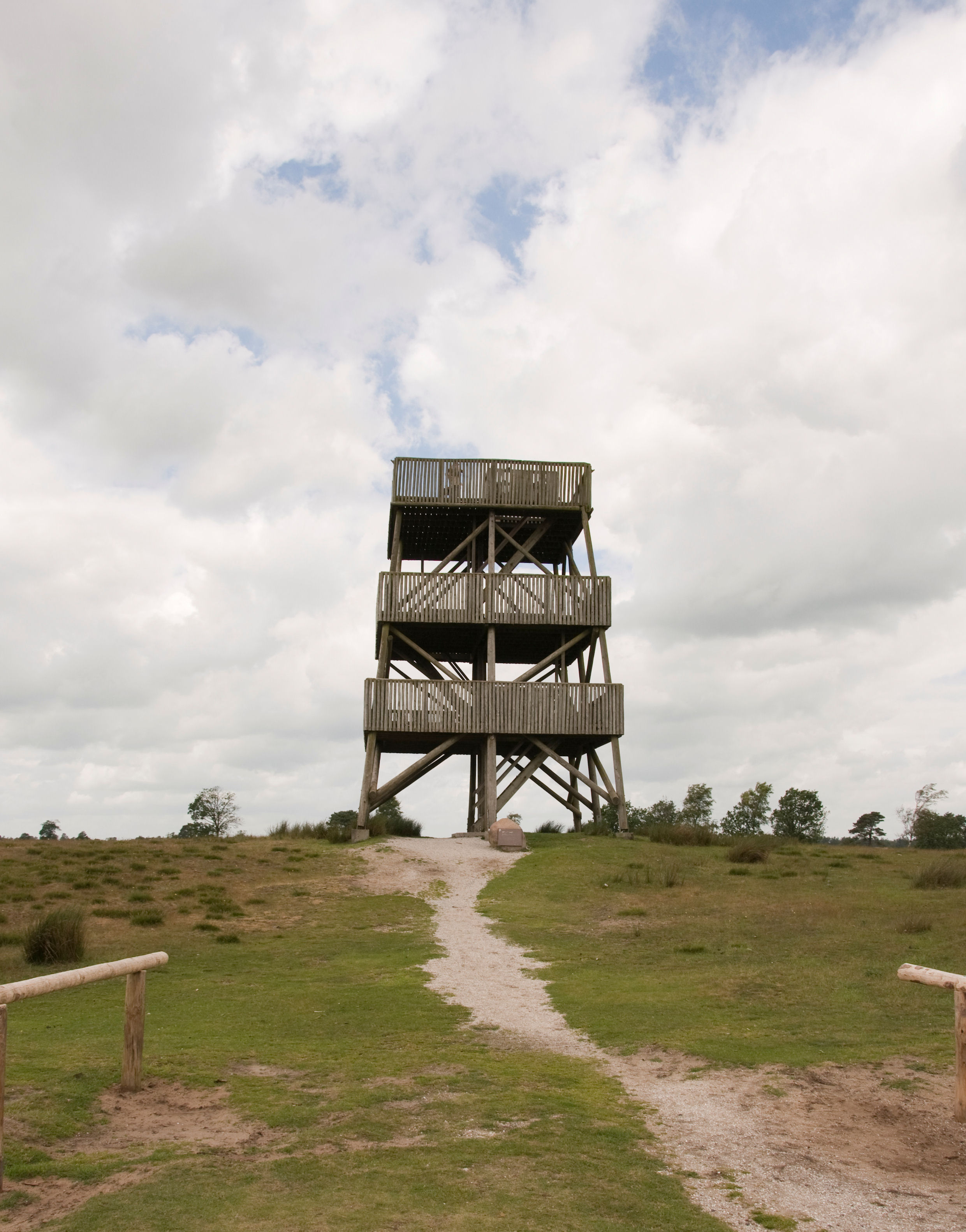
Observation tower in the Drents Frisian Forest

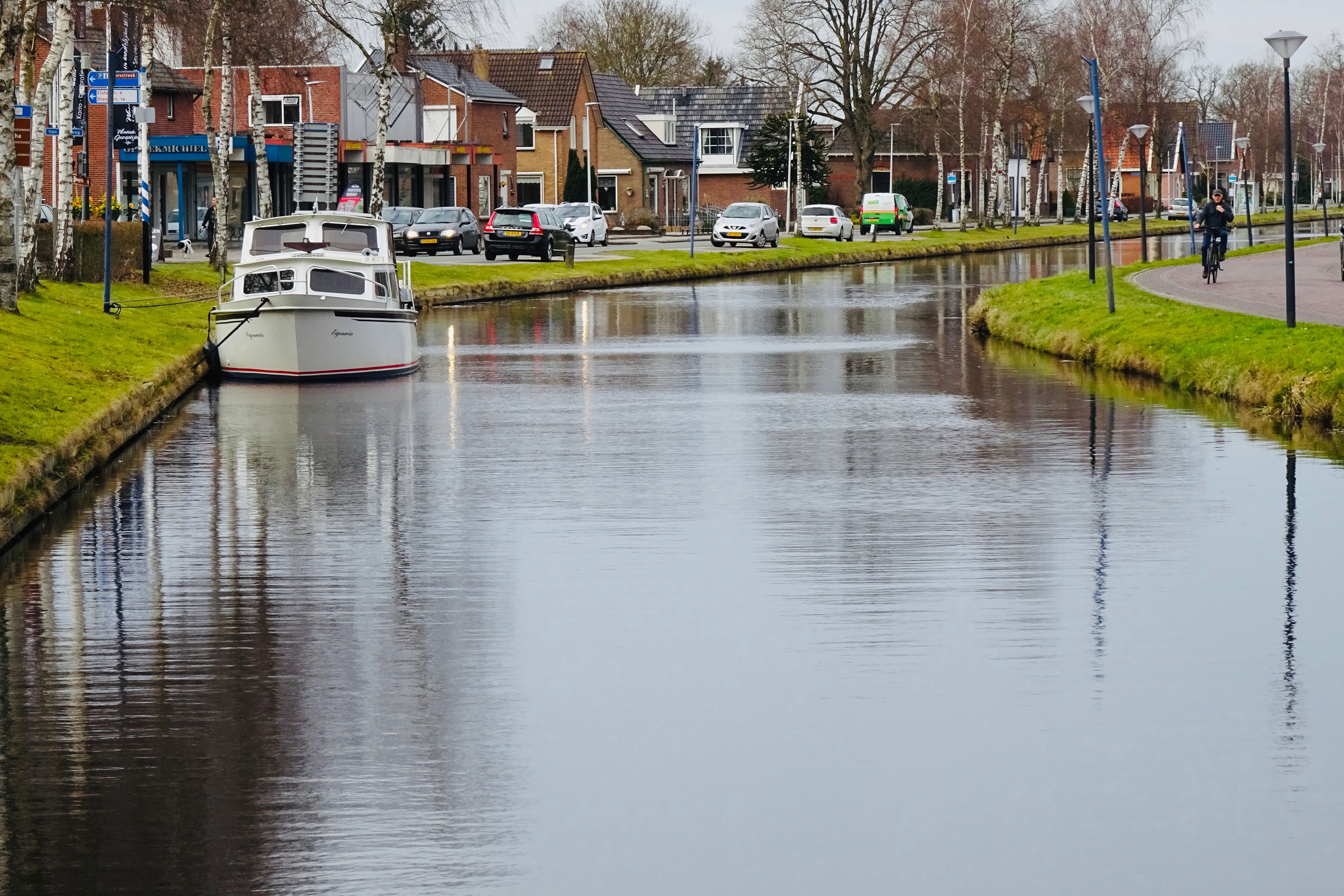
Canal view

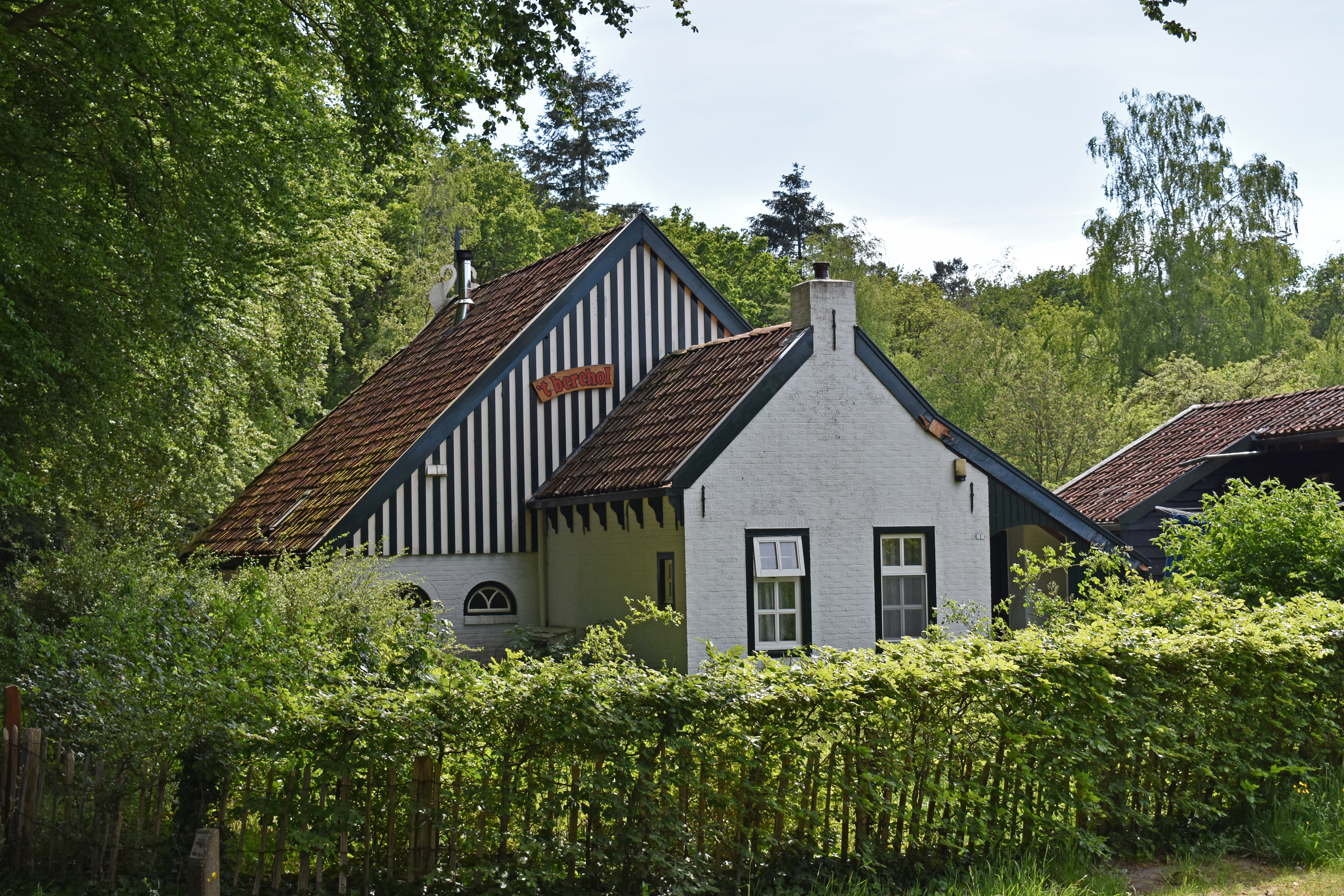
House in Appelscha
