= Roel van Duijn =

Dutch politician, political activist and writer

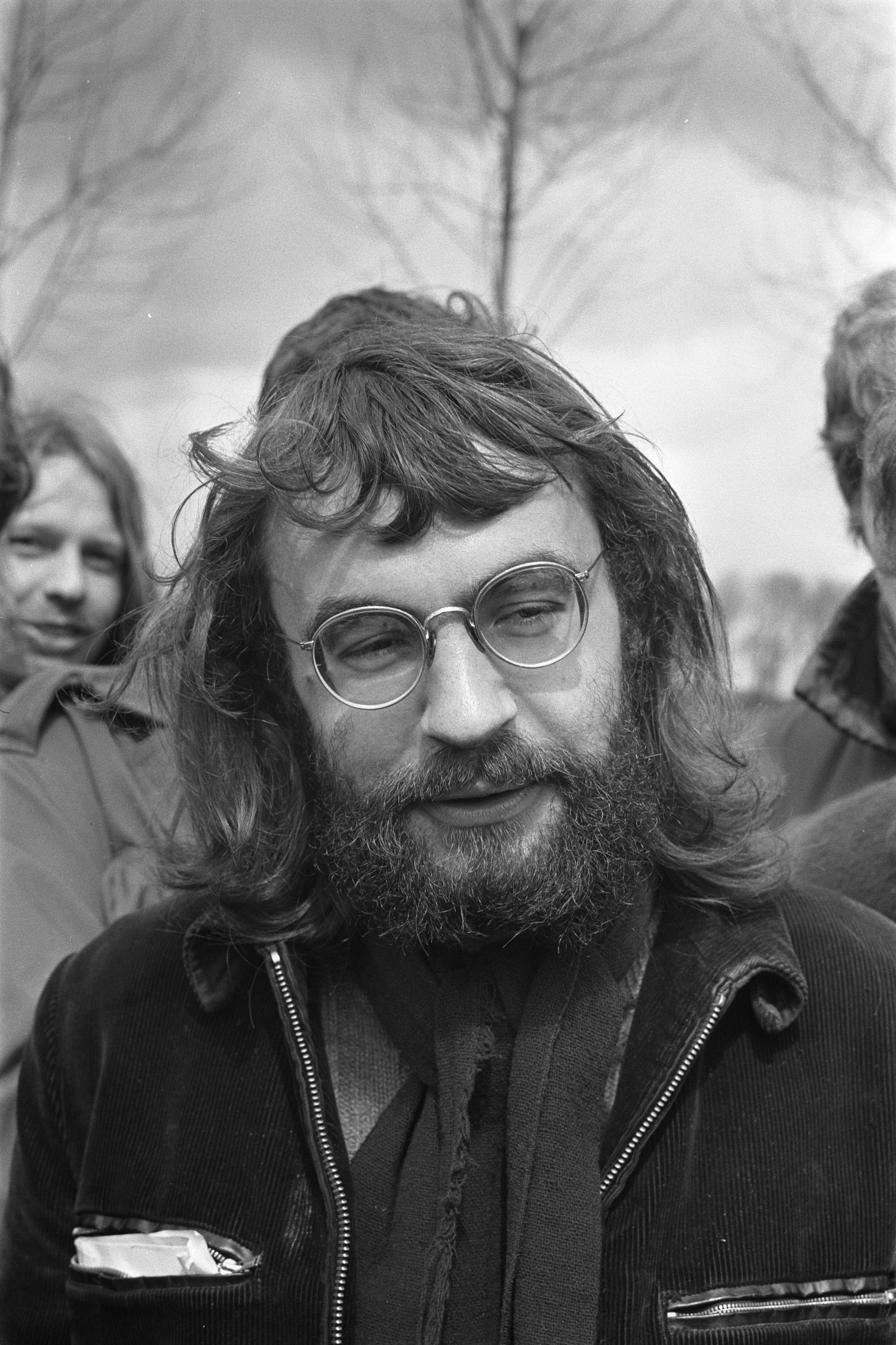

Municipal councillor in Amsterdam
- In office 1969–1974

Alderman in Amsterdam
- In office 1973–1974

Municipal councillor in Amsterdam
- In office 1986–1998

Provincial councillor in North Holland
- In office 1999–2003

Ward councillor in Amsterdam
- In office 2006–2009

Personal details
- Born: 20 January 1943 (age 83) The Hague, Netherlands
- Party: Kabouters, PPR, The Greens, GreenLeft
- Website: www.roelvanduijn.nl

Roeland Hugo Gerrit (Roel) van Duijn (born 20 January 1943) is a Dutch politician, political activist and writer. He was a founder of Provo and the Kabouterbeweging. He was alderman for the Political Party of Radicals and later wardcouncillor for the GreenLeft.

== Biography ==
Van Duijn was born into a theosophical family in the Hague. He attended a Montessori Grammar School and, subsequently, the Montessori Lyceum, where he attended the Gymnasium. He specialised in letters and graduated in 1963. In the Hague he had been active in the peace movement, organising sit-down demonstrations against the nuclear bomb. He had also been editor for De Vrije Socialist, an anarchist magazine.

After graduation he moved to Amsterdam to study political science and history, later turning to law. In 1965 he was one of the founders of the anarchist counter-culture Provo movement. In 1969 he was elected into the Amsterdam municipal council for the movement. In 1969 he founded the Green counter-culture Kaboutermovement and was involved in the Oranjevrijstaat. On 17 April 1970, he was briefly abducted by right-wing radical Joop Baank. Although Van Duijn informed the police authorities afterwards and pressed charges against Baank the latter was not prosecuted.

In 1973 he became a member of the progressive political party Political Party of Radicals (PPR). In 1974 he became Amsterdam alderman for the party. He refused an official car, but instead took an official bike. On 15 February 1975, a bomb was placed in the Venserpolder metro station, which was under construction, by a group of right-wing radicals including Baank. The authorities assumed left-wing squatters had planted the bomb and Van Duijn was the only member of the local government who refused to sign a statement blaming them. His period as alderman ended prematurely in January 1976. During his period as alderman he instigated several initiatives; the use of sustainable energy, a municipal cable network and the municipal television channel (SALTO).

In 1977 he became an organic farmer and started a cheese farm in Veele (municipality of Vlagtwedde) and had two sons. In 1981 he returned to Amsterdam and in 1983 he sold the farm.

In 1984 he was candidate for the European Parliament for the Green Progressive Accord, a combined list of Political Party of Radicals (PPR), Communist Party of the Netherlands (CPN) and the Pacifist Socialist Party (PSP). He did not gain a seat, but joined the parliamentary party as a policy advisor.

He soon became disenchanted with the European Parliament and the PPR. He founded the local party Green Amsterdam and was elected in the 1986 municipal elections. In 1987 The Greens won one seat in the North Holland Provincial council with support of Green Amsterdam. On 10 March 1989 Green Amsterdam joined The Greens. In 1989 he was their national top candidate, but failed to gain a seat. From 1990 until 1998 he was local councillor in Amsterdam for The Greens. In 1999 he became their provincial councillor in North Holland.

In 2001 he joined GroenLinks (GreenLeft). He had unsuccessfully pleaded for a merger of De Groenen (The Greens) and GroenLinks. In 2006 he became ward councillor for GroenLinks in Amsterdam Oud-Zuid.

== Lawsuit against intelligence service ==
In 2009, it was shown that Van Duijn had been shadowed by the General Intelligence and Security Service for decades. He demanded an apology and access to all documents, but only received access to the documents until 1982. He then filed a lawsuit and an appeal to see the rest.

== Bibliography ==
- Het witte gevaar; een vademekum voor provoos (1967)
- Het beste uit "Provo"; een bloemlezing uit alle verschenen nummers van het tijdschrift "Provo" (1967) (samensteller)
- De boodschap van een wijze kabouter; een beschouwing over het filosofische en politieke werk van Peter Kropotkien in verband met onze huidige keuze tussen katastrofe of kabouterstad (1969)
- Schuldbekentenis van een ambassadeur; nota's, beschouwingen, manifesten, artikelen en vragen van een ambassadeur van Oranjevrijstaat in de gemeenteraad van Amsterdam (1970)
- Panies dagboek (1971) ISBN 90-290-0473-8
- Die Botschaft eines weisen Heinzelmännchens; das politische Konzept der Kabouter; eine Betrachtung über das philosophische Werk von Peter Kropotkin in Verbindung mit der heutigen Wahl zwischen Katastrophe und Heinzelmännchenstadt (1971)
- Budskab fra en viis nisse; en oversigt over Peter Kropotkins filosofiske og politiske skrifter i forbindelse med nutidens valg mellem katastrofe og nisseby (1971)
- Bloed; een atoom-roman (1972) ISBN 90-290-0225-5
- Message of a wise Kabouter (1972)
- Energieboekje (1972) ISBN 90-6019-228-1
- Zweet; een soldatenroman (1973) ISBN 90-290-0176-3
- Het wonder van Amsterdam; de hemel geeft, wie vangt die heeft (1974)
- En tranen (1976) ISBN 90-290-0862-8
- De waarheid is een koe; aantekeningen van een kleine boer (1982) ISBN 90-290-1128-9
- Groene politiek; de visie van het Groen Platform (1984) ISBN 90-6184-217-4
- Voeten in de aarde; de eco-crisis en onze erfenis van Abraham Kuyper en Frederik van Eeden; verkenningen in organische en organistische filosofie (1984) ISBN 90-290-1906-9
- Provo; de geschiedenis van de provotarische beweging 1965-1967 (1985) ISBN 90-290-1618-3 (met foto's van Cor Jaring)
- Hoefslag; over politiek en spiritualiteit (1988) ISBN 90-290-3912-4
- Het leeuwekind; roman (1991) ISBN 90-290-2810-6
- Blijft Amsterdam?; het referendum en de gedaanteveranderingen van de hoofdstad (1996) ISBN 90-290-5236-8
- De bruidenoorlog; gemengde liefde en oorlog in Macedonië (2003) ISBN 90-6728-163-8
- Liefdesverdriet; roman, gevolgd door Hoe word ik een ster in ldvd? (2004) ISBN 90-290-7532-5
