= List of World Heritage Sites in the Netherlands =

Location of UNESCO World Heritage Sites within the Netherlands. Blue dots indicate the Colonies of Benevolence sites. There are 39 sites of the Lower German Limes, Vechten is shown.
Location of UNESCO World Heritage Sites within Curaçao

The United Nations Educational, Scientific and Cultural Organization (UNESCO) World Heritage Sites are places of importance to cultural or natural heritage as described in the UNESCO World Heritage Convention, established in 1972. Cultural heritage consists of monuments (such as architectural works, monumental sculptures, or inscriptions), groups of buildings, and sites (including archaeological sites). Natural heritage consists of natural features (physical and biological formations), geological and physiographical formations (including habitats of threatened species of animals and plants), and natural sites which are important from the point of view of science, conservation, or natural beauty. The Netherlands accepted the convention on 26 August 1992, making its natural and historical sites eligible for inclusion on the list.

There are 13 properties in the Kingdom of the Netherlands inscribed on the World Heritage List. Twelve of those sites are in the Netherlands (of which three are shared with neighbouring countries) and one is in Curaçao, in the Caribbean. The Netherlands and Curaçao are both constituent countries of the Kingdom of the Netherlands. Twelve sites are cultural properties and one is a natural property. The first site added to the list was Schokland and Surroundings in 1995. The transnational site Wadden Sea (a natural site) is shared with Denmark and Germany, the Colonies of Benevolence are shared with Belgium, and the Lower German Limes is shared with Germany. There are currently two properties on the tentative list. One of these sites is in Curaçao, and one is in Bonaire, which is a special municipality of the Netherlands, located in the Caribbean.

== World Heritage Sites ==
UNESCO lists sites under ten criteria; each entry must meet at least one of the criteria. Criteria i through vi are cultural, and vii through x are natural.

* Transnational site

World Heritage Sites
Site	Image	Location	Year listed	UNESCO data	Description
Schokland and Surroundings	Partially flooded fields, view from above	Noordoostpolder, Flevoland	1995	739; iii, v (cultural)	Schokland demonstrates how the people of the Netherlands were struggling against the sea. It is a peninsula which had been inhabited since prehistoric times, it became an island in the 15th century, until it was completely encroached by the Zuiderzee in 1859. The Noordoostpolder was created in the 1940s and consequently Schokland was reclaimed.
Dutch Water Defence Lines	Wall with several metal gates	North Holland, Utrecht, South Holland and North Brabant	1996	759bis; ii, iv, v (cultural)	The defence line of Amsterdam was built between 1883 and 1920. The fortification is based on the principle of controlling the waters around a city. It contains a network of 45 armed forts and can temporarily flood polders extending 135 kilometres (84 mi) around Amsterdam. The site was originally listed as the Defence Line of Amsterdam in 1996. In 2021, it was expanded to include defence structures at a total of 9 locations and renamed as the Dutch Water Defence Lines.
Mill Network at Kinderdijk-Elshout	Several windmills, water channel in front	Alblasserdam and Nieuw-Lekkerland, South Holland	1997	818; i, ii, iv (cultural)	This property is an example of the human-made landscape created by draining the water from the polders. Construction of hydraulic works began in the Middle Ages to create the land for agriculture and to settle. Technological heritage includes high- and low-lying drainage and transport channels for superfluous polder water, embankments and dikes, 3 pumping stations, 2 discharge sluices, 2 Water Board Assembly Houses, and 19 drainage mills, the majority of which were constructed between 1738 and 1740.
Historic Area of Willemstad, Inner City and Harbour, Curaçao	Waterfront with a series of brightly coloured houses	Willemstad, Curaçao	1997	819; ii, iv, v (cultural)	Willemstad was established as a trading settlement by merchants from the Netherlands in 1634. The modern town consists of several historic districts, which reflect the mix of Dutch, Spanish, and Portuguese cultural influences, as well as the Afro-Caribbean. Several historic houses are painted in bright colours, which is a tradition dating to the early 19th century.
Ir.D.F. Woudagemaal (D.F. Wouda Steam Pumping Station)	A brick building (the pumping station), water in front	Lemmer, Lemsterland, Friesland	1998	867; i, ii, iv (cultural)	The Wouda Steam Pumping Station is a steam-powered installation to prevent the flooding of the low-lying areas of Friesland. It started operating in 1920. When built, it was the largest and the technologically most advanced steam pumping station in the world. At the time of listing, it was still fully functioning.
Droogmakerij de Beemster (Beemster Polder)	Historical map of the polder with clearly seen rectangular grid	Beemster, North Holland	1999	899, i, ii, iv (cultural)	Beemster Polder is the first polder that was created by reclaiming land from a lake. It was drained in 1612, which was made possible by advancements in windmill technology. The polder was laid down in a geometric pattern, in line with Renaissance planning principles. The basic plot is a rectangle of 180 metres (590 ft) by 900 metres (3,000 ft). The pattern of roads and watercourses runs north to south and east to west. The polder is still used for agriculture.
Rietveld Schröderhuis (Rietveld Schröder House)	A modernist-style house in front, older brick houses in the background	Utrecht, Utrecht	2000	965; i, ii (cultural)	The Rietveld Schröder House was built in 1924. It was commissioned by Truus Schröder-Schräder and designed by Gerrit Thomas Rietveld. The house is one of the best known examples of the De Stijl movement. It is a small one-family house with a flexible interior spatial arrangement, which allowed gradual changes over time in accordance with changes in functions. In the 1970s and 1980s it was carefully restored to its original condition and has been since preserved as a museum.
The Wadden Sea*	Coast with sandy dunes	Friesland, Groningen, and North Holland	2009	1314; viii, ix, x (natural)	The Wadden Sea is the largest unbroken system of intertidal sand and mud flats in the world. It is an important biodiversity spot, home to the species such as harbour seal, grey seal, and harbour porpoise. The sites in Germany and the Netherlands were inscribed to the World Heritage List in 2009, the property in Denmark was added in 2014.
Seventeenth-century canal ring area of Amsterdam inside the Singelgracht	Channels of Amsterdam from above	Amsterdam, North Holland	2010	1349; i, ii, iv (cultural)	The Amsterdam Canal District was designed at the end of the 16th century and constructed in the 17th century, as a new and entirely artificial port city. The canals are laid out in concentric arcs, intersected with radial waterways and streets. The majority of the houses erected in the 17th and 18th centuries are preserved, while the old civil and hydraulic structures have generally been replaced. In the 17th and 18th centuries, Amsterdam was seen as a reference model for several projects around the world.
Van Nelle Factory	White factory building with large letters "Van Nelle"	Rotterdam, South Holland	2014	1441; ii, iv (cultural)	The factory was built in the 1920s as a food processing and packaging plant for coffee, tea, and tobacco. It was designed by Leendert van der Vlugt and represents a new concept of factory, a symbol of the modernist and functionalist culture of the inter-war period. The façades are made of steel and glass, providing daylight to the workers. The industrial activities in the factory ceased in the 1990s, the property is now run by a new owner.
Colonies of Benevolence*	Red brick house with two chimneys	Drenthe	2021	1555rev; ii, iv (cultural)	In the aftermath of the Napoleonic Wars in Europe, large sections of the population of the Low Countries were left impoverished. To address the social issues, the Society of Benevolence was founded in 1818 and constructed seven agricultural colonies for families, orphans, beggars, and retired military personnel. This approach was innovative with the combination of education, healthcare and (forced) labour to ensure the self-sufficiency of the colonies. Three of these colonies are listed in the Netherlands: Veenhuizen, Frederiksoord (pictured), and Wilhelminaoord. One site, Wortel, is listed in Belgium.
Frontiers of the Roman Empire – The Lower German Limes*	Reconstruction of a wooden watch tower	several sites	2021	1631; ii, iii, iv (cultural)	The Lower German Limes protected the Roman province of Germania Inferior (Lower Germany), along the Rhine from the Rhenish Massif to the North Sea coast. The fortifications were established in the late 1st century BCE and remained in use until the disintegration of the Western Roman Empire in the early 5th century CE. The site comprises 102 sites, 39 of which are in the Netherlands, the others are in Germany. Sites include remains of forts, towns, roads, and other infrastructure. A reconstructed watch tower in Vechten is pictured.
Eisinga Planetarium in Franeker	Model of Solar system	Franeker, Friesland	2023	1683; iv (cultural)	The Royal Eise Eisinga Planetarium in Franeker is the oldest working planetarium in the world. It includes an orrery, a mechanical model of the Solar System, that was built by Eise Eisinga between 1774 and 1781. It is still fully operational.

== Tentative list ==
In addition to sites inscribed on the World Heritage list, member states can maintain a list of tentative sites that they may consider for nomination. Nominations for the World Heritage list are only accepted if the site was previously listed on the tentative list. The Netherlands has two sites on its tentative list.

Tentative sites
Site	Image	Location	Year listed	UNESCO criteria	Description
Bonaire National Marine Park	Fish in front of corals	Bonaire, Caribbean Netherlands	2011	vii, ix (natural)	The park consists of 2,700 hectares (6,700 acres) of coral reef, seagrass beds and mangroves. It is the habitat of more than 50 varieties of stony coral and over 350 species of reef fish, as well as a nesting ground for sea turtles. The coral reefs are the least degraded in the entire Caribbean.
Plantations in West Curaçao	White plantation building with red roof, trees around	Curaçao	2011	ii, iv, v (cultural)	Four plantations included in this nomination (Ascencion, San Juan, Savonet, and Knip) demonstrate the specific type of Dutch plantations operating in a dry tropical climate, facing issues with water management. As opposed to other plantations in the Caribbean, they focused on several crops and not only sugar. They were initially run on slave labour and were active from the 17th to the early 20th century.

== See also ==
- List of Intangible Cultural Heritage elements in the Netherlands
