= Zorgvlied =

- Village
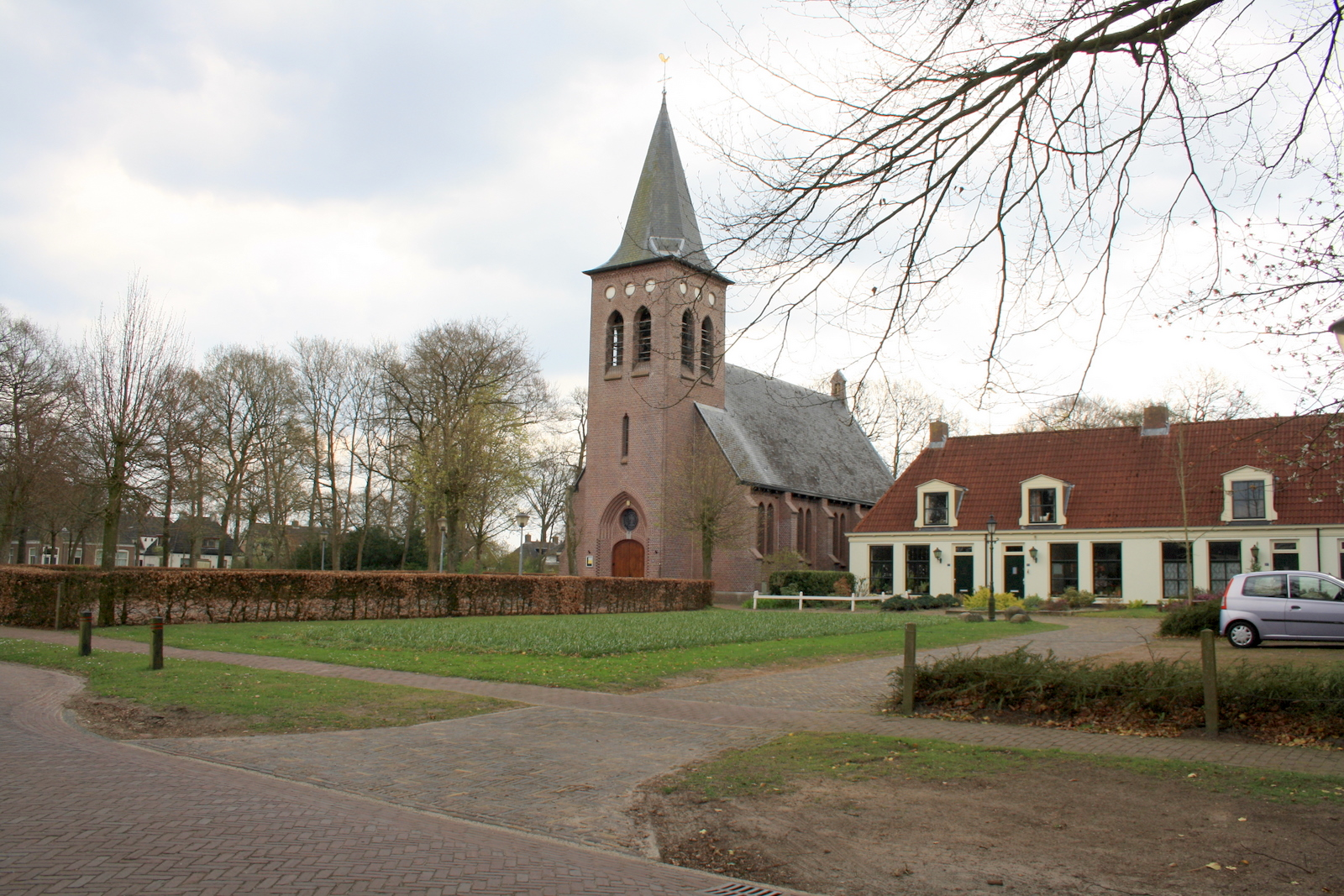
- Church at Zorgvlied

- Flag Coat of arms

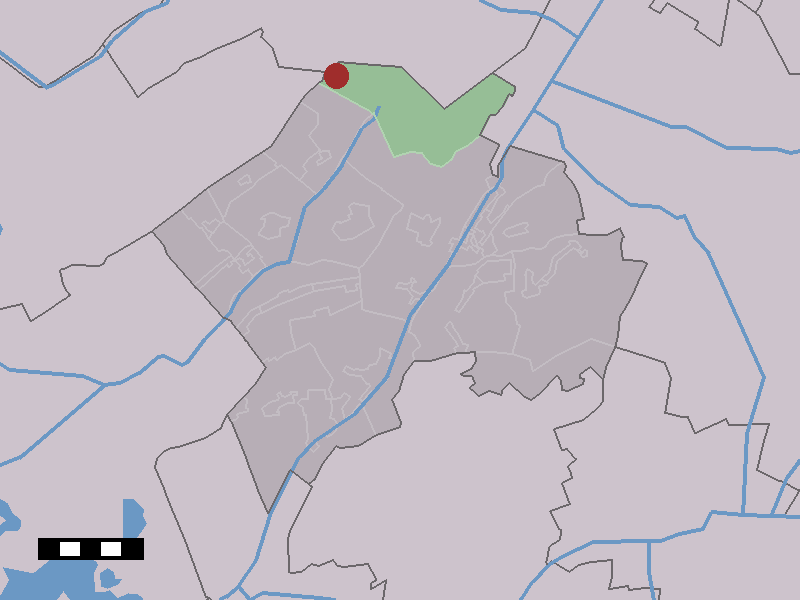
- The village (dark red) and the statistical district (light green) of Zorgvlied in the municipality of Westerveld.

- Location in province of Drenthe in the Netherlands Zorgvlied (Netherlands)
- Coordinates: 52°55′N 6°15′E
- Country: Netherlands
- Province: Drenthe
- Municipality: Westerveld

Area
  - Total: 23.66 km^{2} (9.14 sq mi)
- Elevation: 8 m (26 ft)

Population (2021)
  - Total: 485
  - Density: 20.5/km^{2} (53.1/sq mi)
- Time zone: UTC+1 (CET)
  - Summer (DST): UTC+2 (CEST)
- Postal code: 8437 & 8438
- Dialing code: 0521

Zorgvlied (Dutch pronunciation: [ˈzɔr(ə)xflit]) is a village in the Dutch province of Drenthe. It is a part of the municipality of Westerveld, and lies about 23 km west of Assen.

The municipality received its name by the former villa "Zorgvlied".

== History ==
From 1819 to 1823, the Maatschappij van Weldadigheid purchased large areas of heather around Groot and Klein Wateren in the market of Diever and Wateren. The Institute of Agriculture was founded in 1823 against the Frisian border. This school was one of the first in the Netherlands. Until 1859 she - the school was also known as the "teachers school" - functioned as a training institute for the Society of Humanitarianism. The building is still clearly recognizable in the village (to the right of the Roman Catholic Church) and accommodates today home to four elderly people.

In 1859, the grounds and the school were sold to J.F.de Ruyter de Wildt, a distant relative of the famous admiral Michiel de Ruyter. De Ruyter de Wildt built the villa "Castera Vetera", which was completed in 1862.

In 1879 it was sold to Lodewijk Guillaume Verwer. Who called the villa "Huize Zorgvlied". He brought tobacco growers from Brabant and Frisian Catholic farmers to his estate. In 1880 he started in a house chapel with Roman Catholic worship services. In 1893, the parish of Wateren-Zorgvlied became a reality in this small Catholic enclave. From 1994 to 2003, the parish priest of this parish was J.H.J. (Hans) van den Hende, who later became bishop of Breda and Rotterdam.

Verwer died in 1910. He left 250 ha of land with villas and farms. "Huize Zorgvlied" was demolished in 1930, but the name survived as the name of a village that is now an important tourist centre.

== Gallery ==
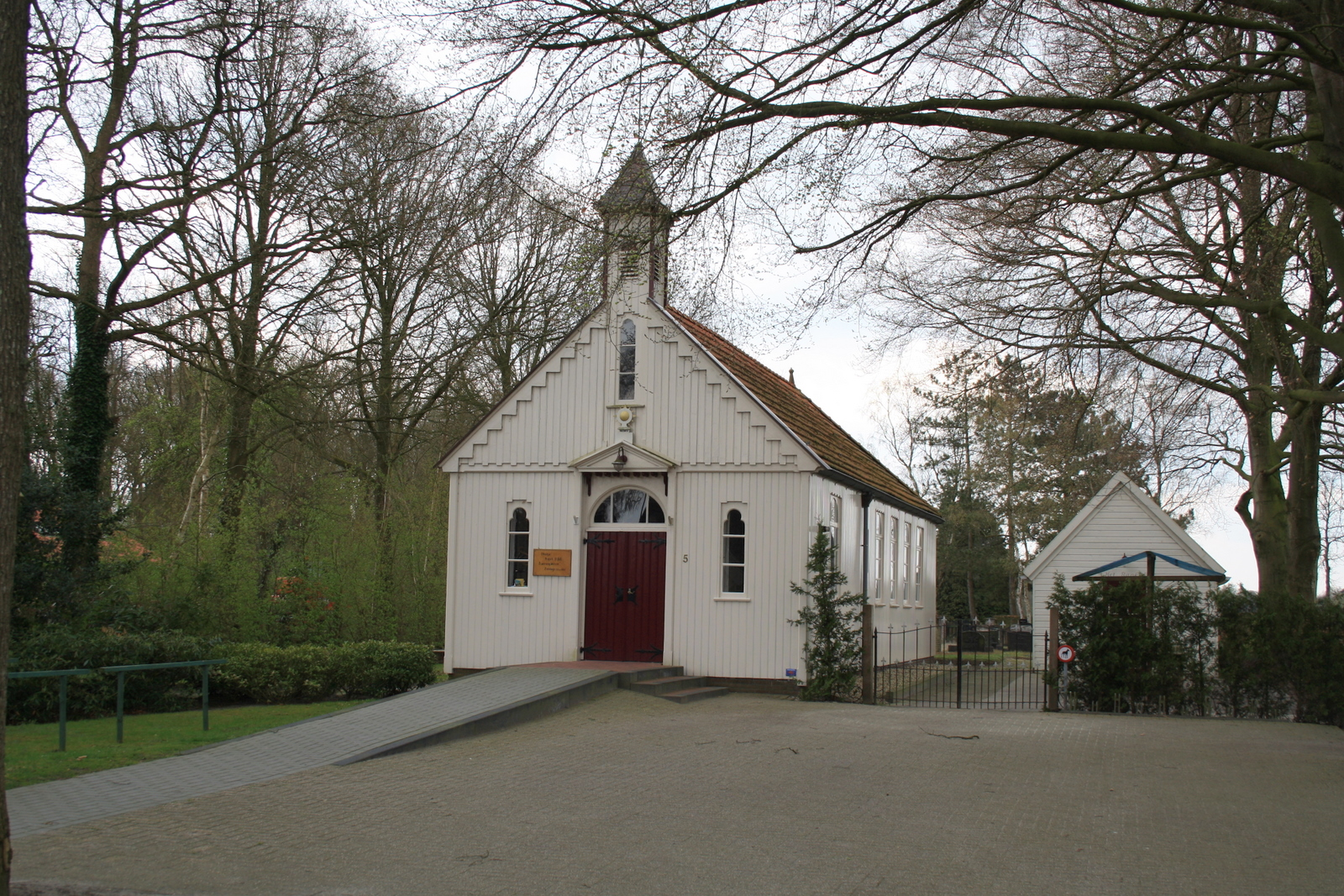
Chapel

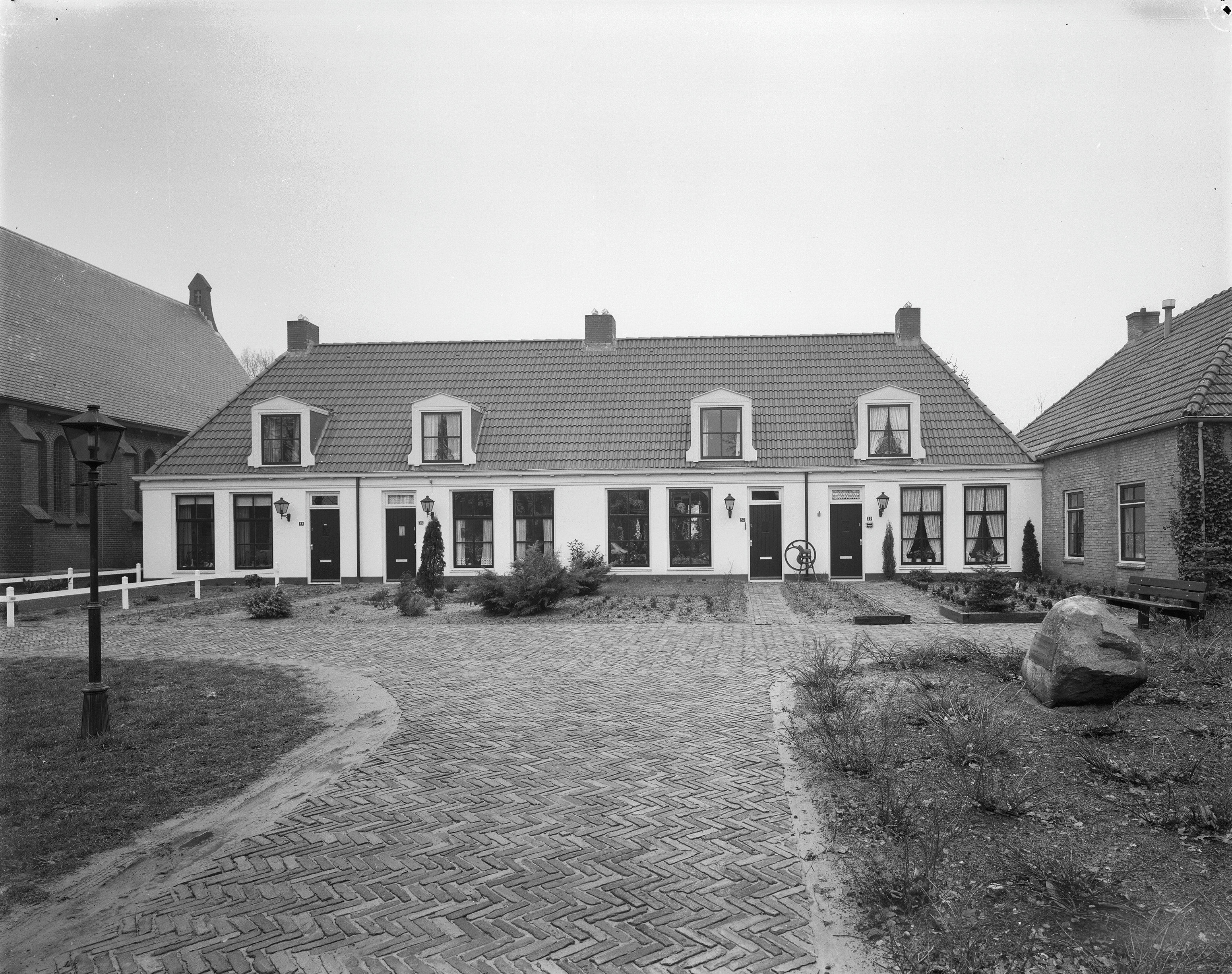
Zorgvlied
