= Wortel, Belgium =

Wortel
- Village
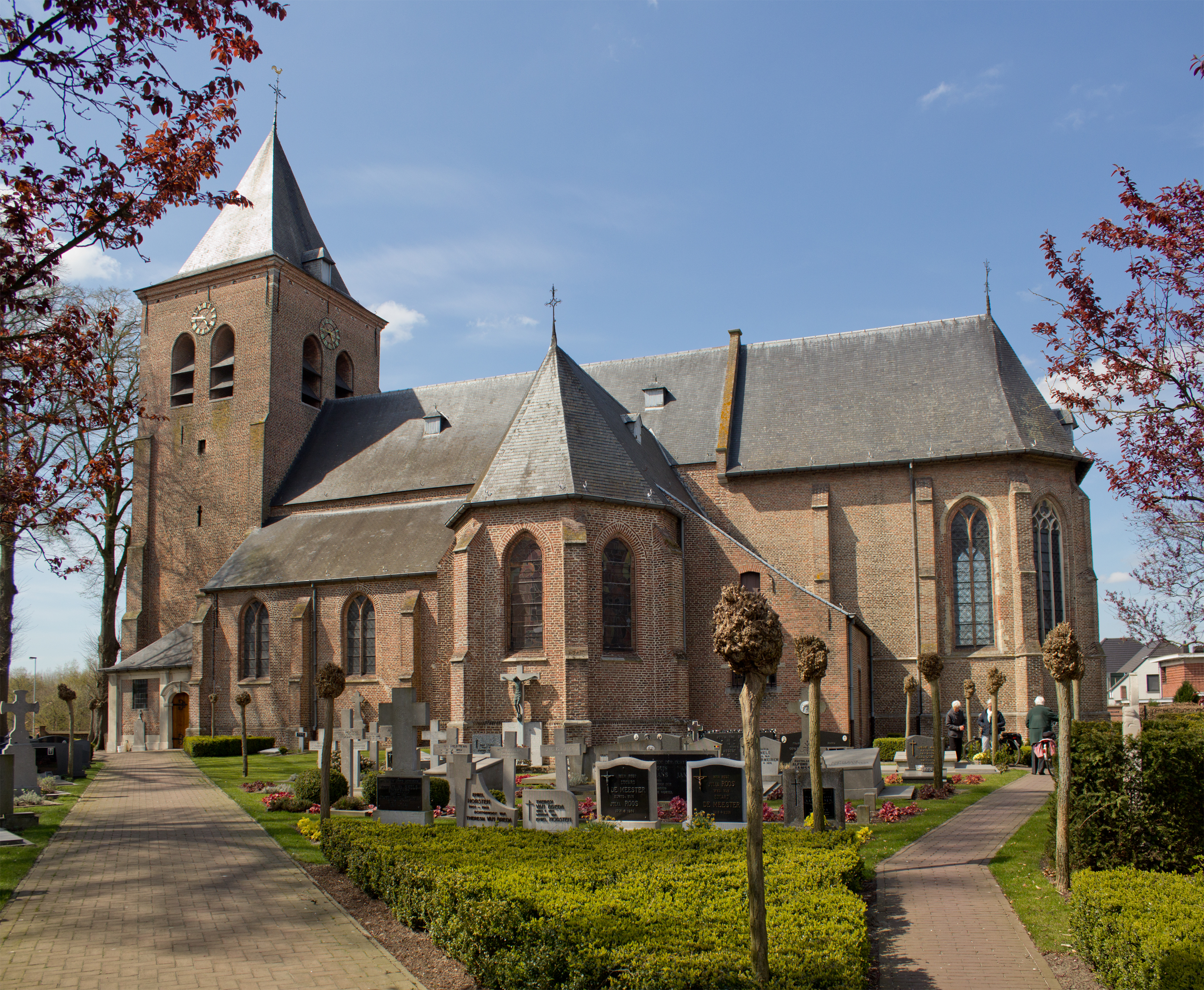
- St John the Baptist Church

- Location in Belgium
- Coordinates: 51.3978°N 4.7958°E
- Country: Belgium
- Region: Flemish Region
- Province: Antwerp
- Municipality: Hoogstraten

Area
  - Total: 13.54 km^{2} (5.23 sq mi)

Population (2021)
  - Total: 1,844
  - Density: 136.2/km^{2} (352.7/sq mi)
- Time zone: CET

UNESCO World Heritage Site
- Part of: Colonies of Benevolence
- Criteria: Cultural: ii, iv
- Reference: 1555bis-002
- Inscription: 2021 (44th Session)

Wortel is a village in the Belgian municipality of Hoogstraten. As of 2021, it has 1,844 inhabitants.

The toponym means carrot or root in Dutch. Wortel was established in the early 19th century by the Society of Benevolence as a farming colony for the able-bodied working poor. It was meant to provide employment during a time when poverty rates were very high in the Low Countries. Along with the other colonies constructed by the Society of Benevolence, Wortel was inscribed on the UNESCO World Heritage List in 2021 as an excellent example of a unique method of housing reform and urban planning.

== Gallery ==
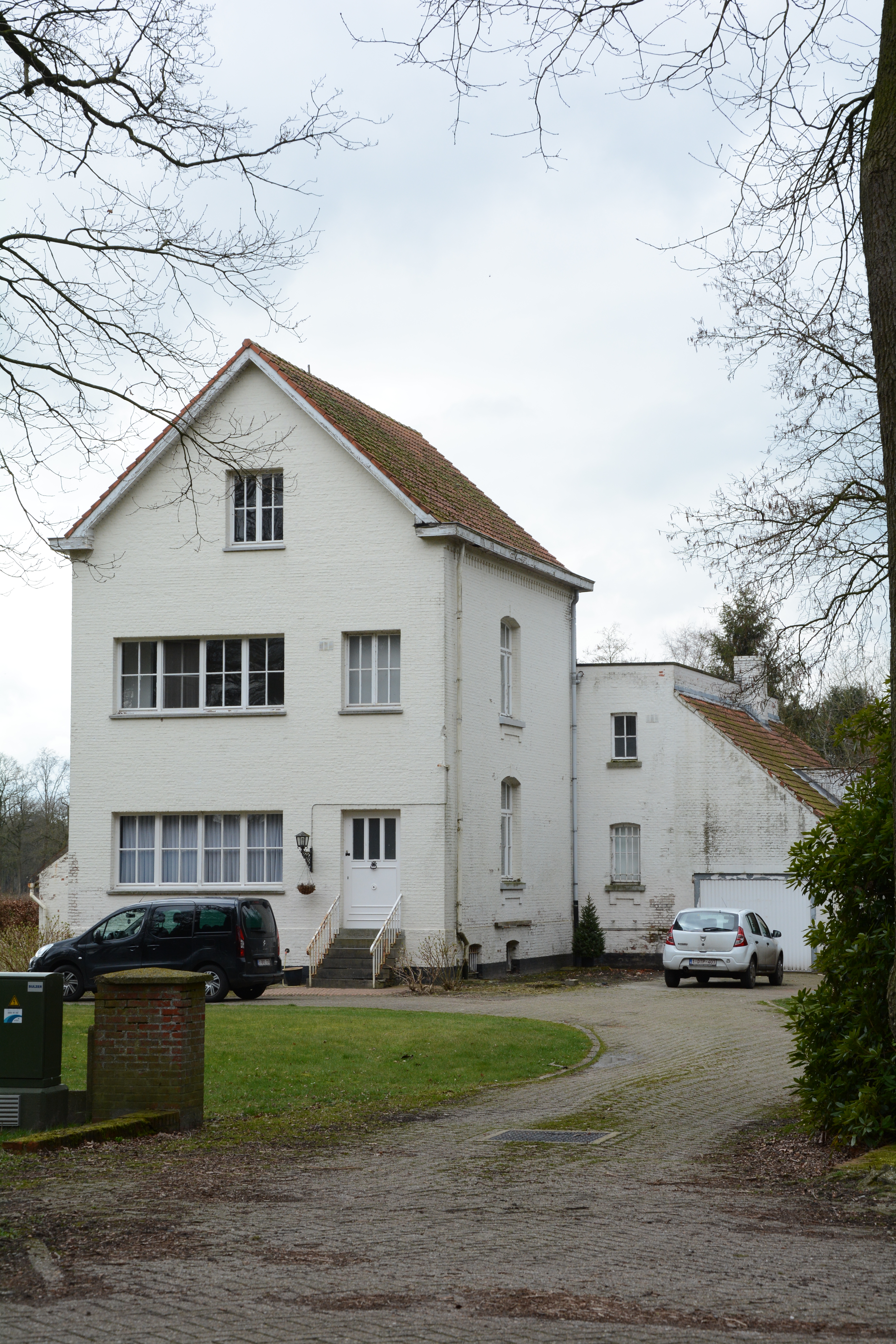
Colony house

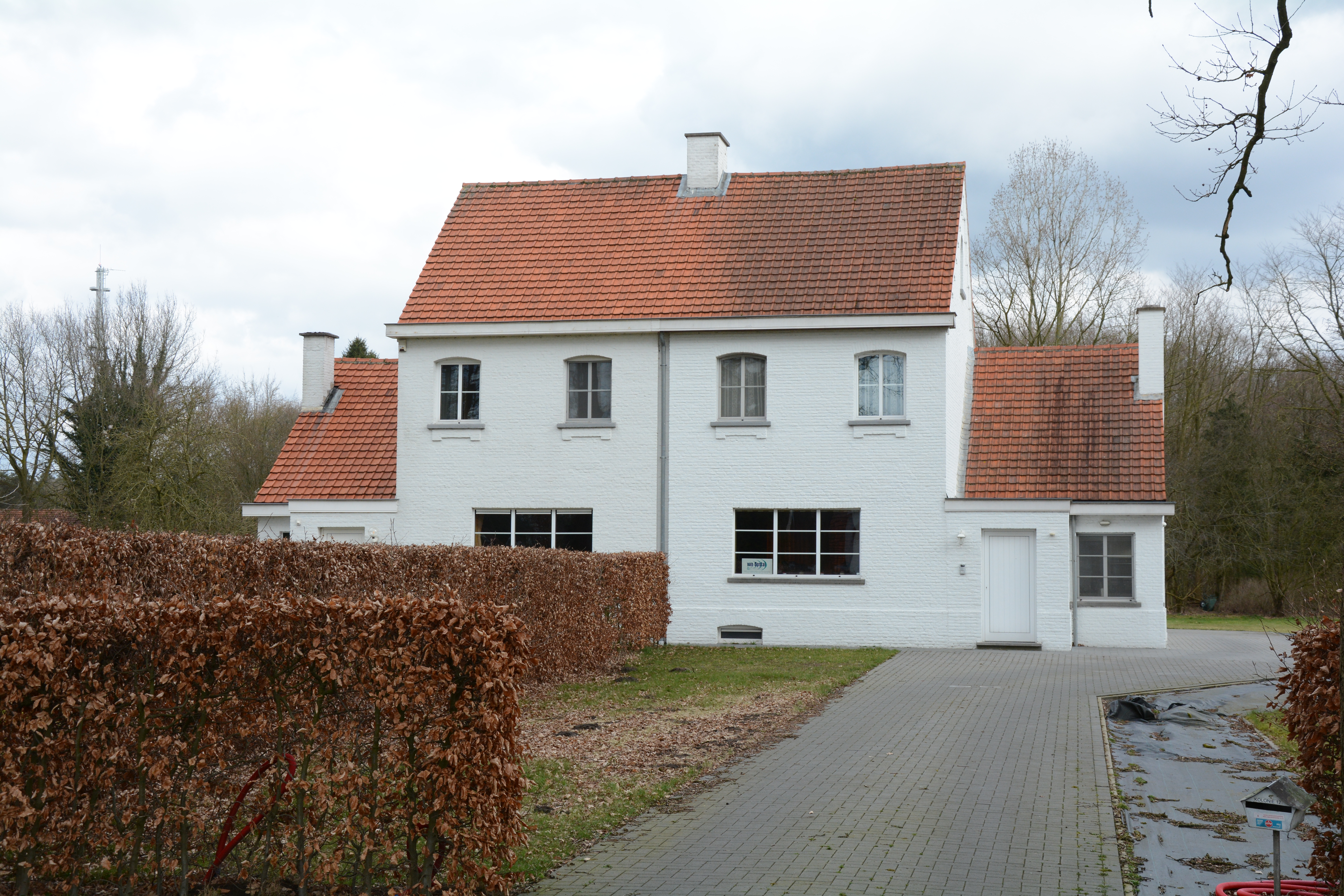
Guard house of the colony

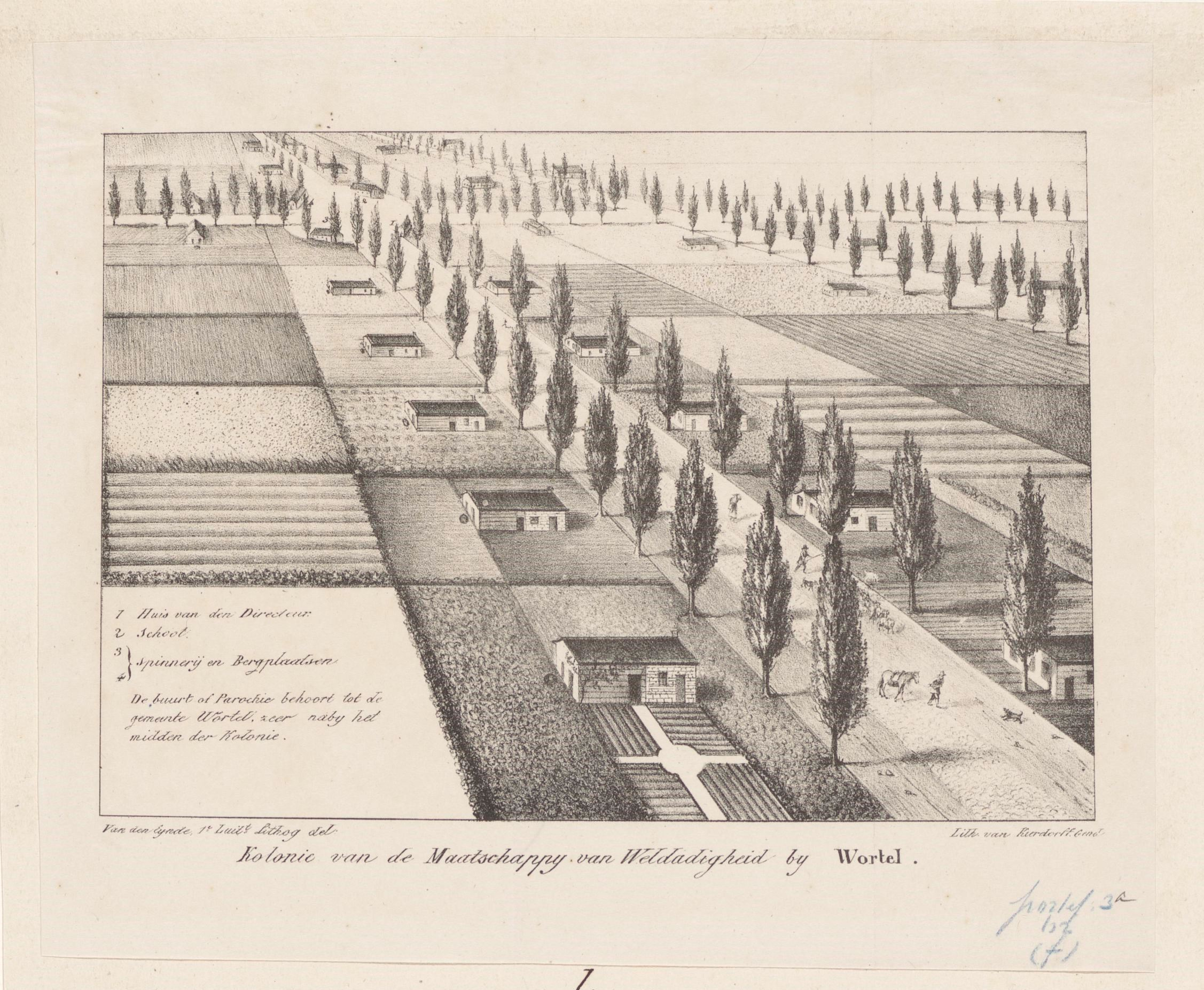
Colony map

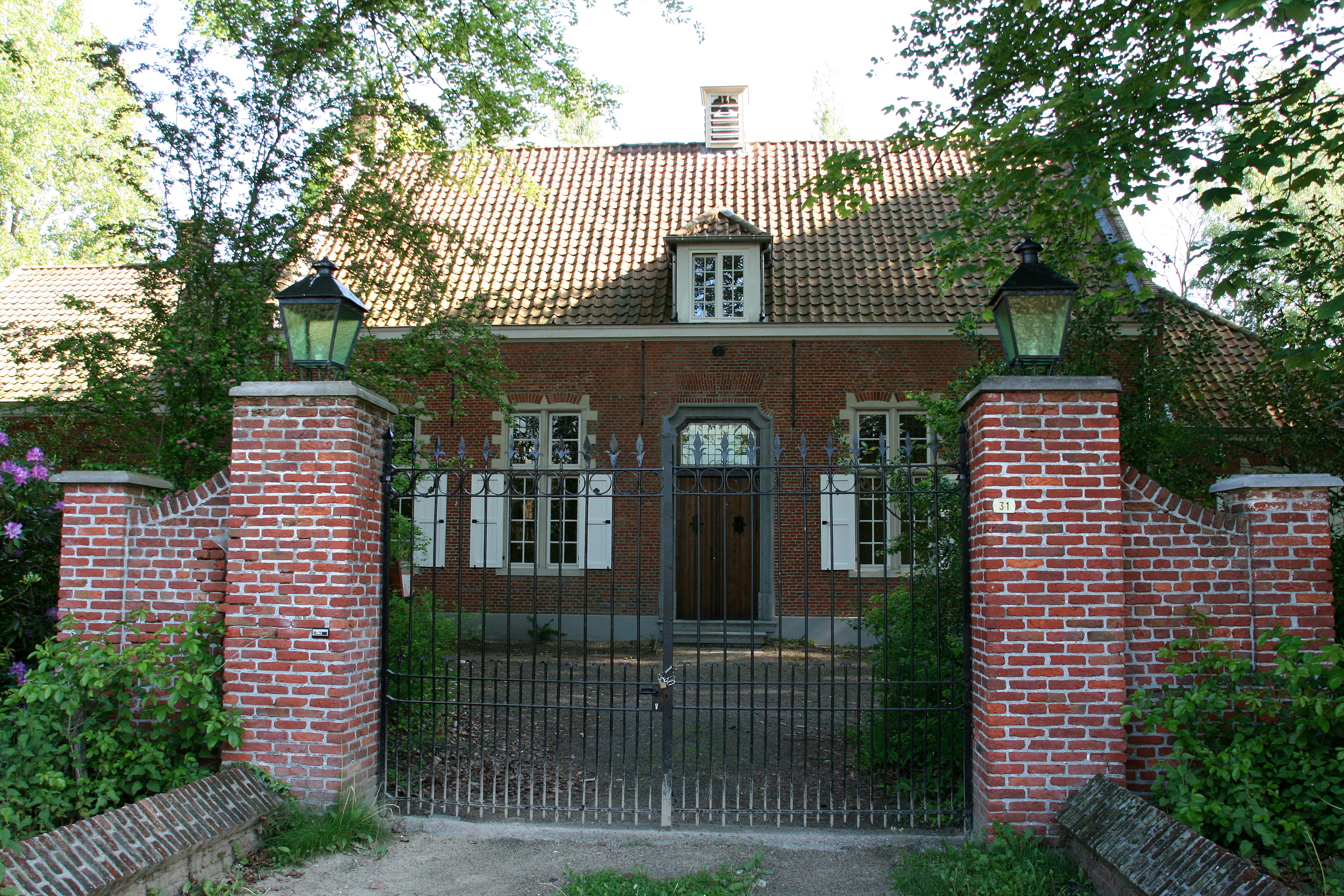
Clergy house
