= Veenhuizen, Noordenveld =

Veenhuizen
- Village
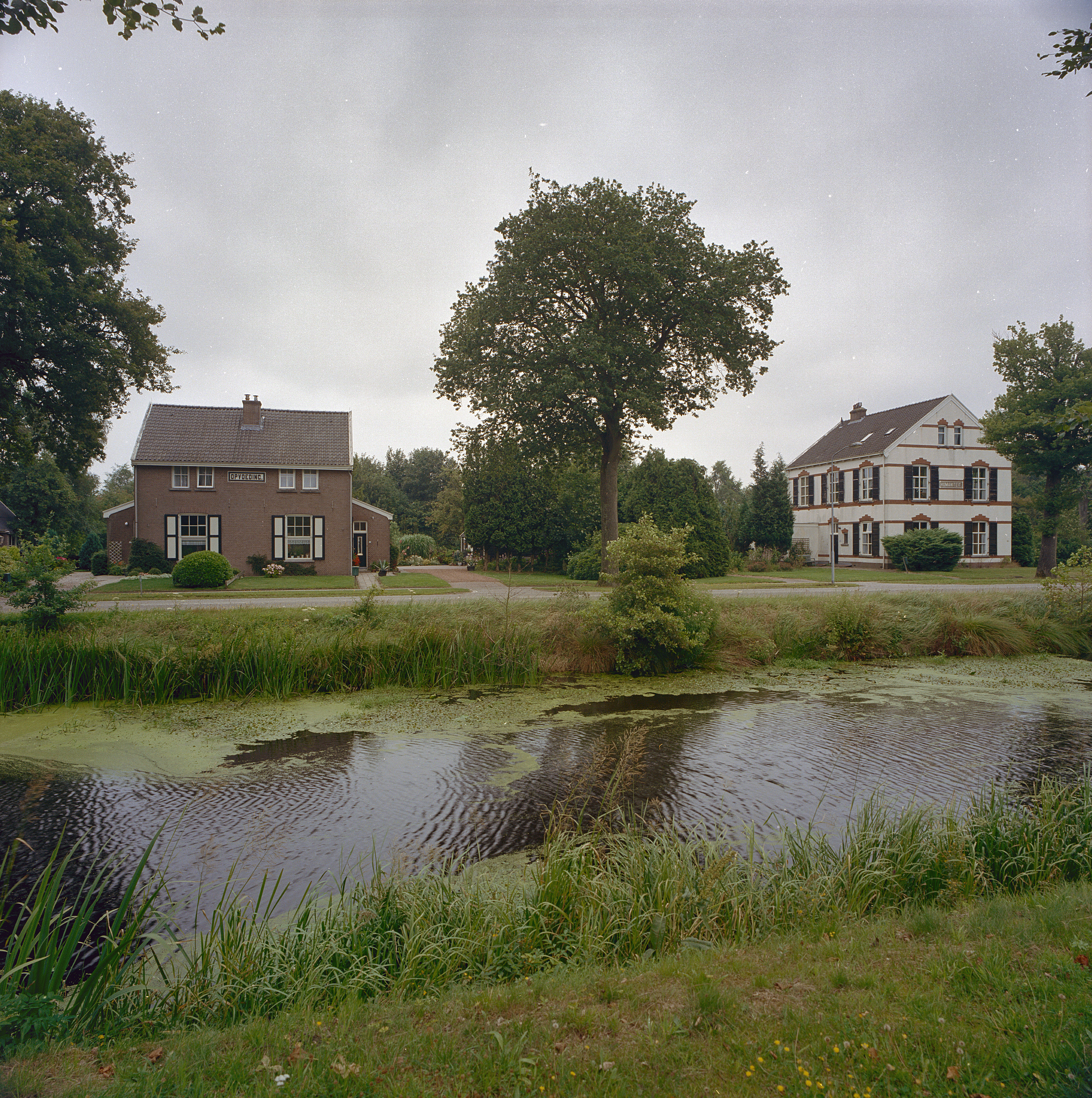
- Veenhuizen (2012)

- Location in province of Drenthe in the Netherlands Veenhuizen (Netherlands)
- Coordinates: 53°1′58″N 6°23′45″E
- Country: Netherlands
- Province: Drenthe
- Municipality: Noordenveld

Area
  - Total: 32.01 km^{2} (12.36 sq mi)
- Elevation: 8 m (26 ft)

Population (2021)
  - Total: 1,265
  - Density: 39.52/km^{2} (102.4/sq mi)
- Time zone: UTC+1 (CET)
  - Summer (DST): UTC+2 (CEST)
- Postal code: 9341
- Dialing code: 0592

UNESCO World Heritage Site
- Part of: Colonies of Benevolence
- Criteria: Cultural: ii, iv
- Reference: 1555bis-003
- Inscription: 2021 (44th Session)

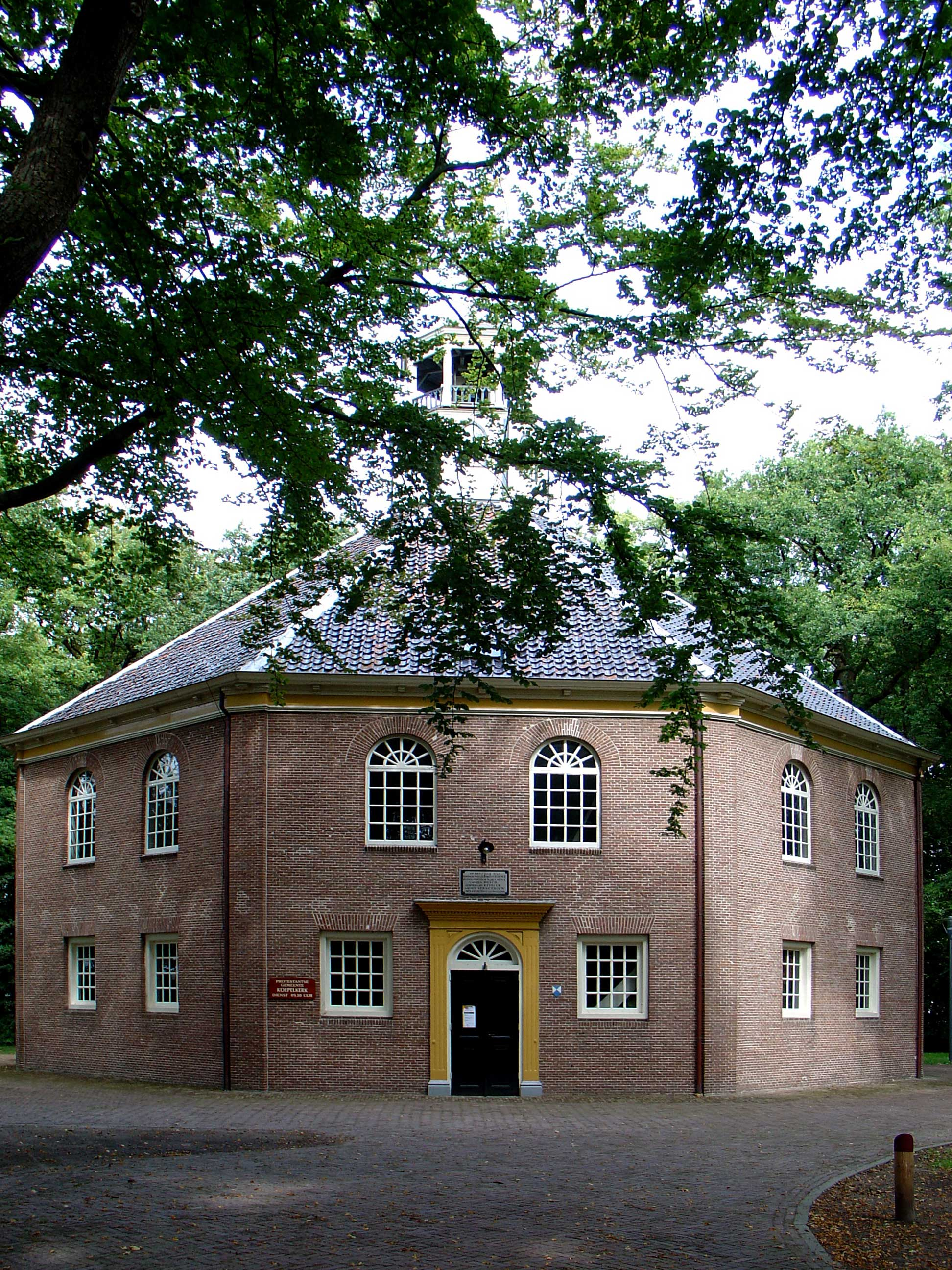
Protestant church of Veenhuizen built in 1825/1826

Veenhuizen (Dutch pronunciation: [veːnˈɦœyzə(n)]) is a village with around 800 inhabitants in the province of Drenthe in the Netherlands. In the early 19th century, a reform housing colony for the poor and homeless was established in Veenhuizen by the Society of Benevolence. In the late 19th century, the complex was turned into a penal colony. The village became freely accessible in 1984 and has been part of the municipality of Noordenveld since 1998. The National Prison Museum is located here. Along with other colonies established by the Society of Benevolence, Veenhuizen was inscribed on the UNESCO World Heritage List in 2021, for its testimony to a unique method of housing reform and its urban planning

== History ==
=== Origins ===
The history of Veenhuizen goes back to the late Middle Ages but only as an insignificant hamlet alongside a little stream called the "Slokkert". This was situated a little to the north of the current village.

=== Reform housing colony ===
Change came when the general Johannes van den Bosch started the Maatschappij van Weldadigheid (which translates into Society for Benevolence) in the 1820s. The company bought 30 km² of land to found colonies which would house and provide work for the poor from the large cities in the west of the Netherlands.

Veenhuizen then became a reform housing colony for the poor and homeless from the large cities (like Amsterdam and The Hague).

The change is still evident in the way the village was set up. The village is made up of roads in a grid pattern with blocks measuring 700 by 700 metres, in a style similar to that of American villages. However, they differ from villages in the United States in that most of these blocks are still filled in with farmland on which the inmates used to work.

=== Penal colony ===
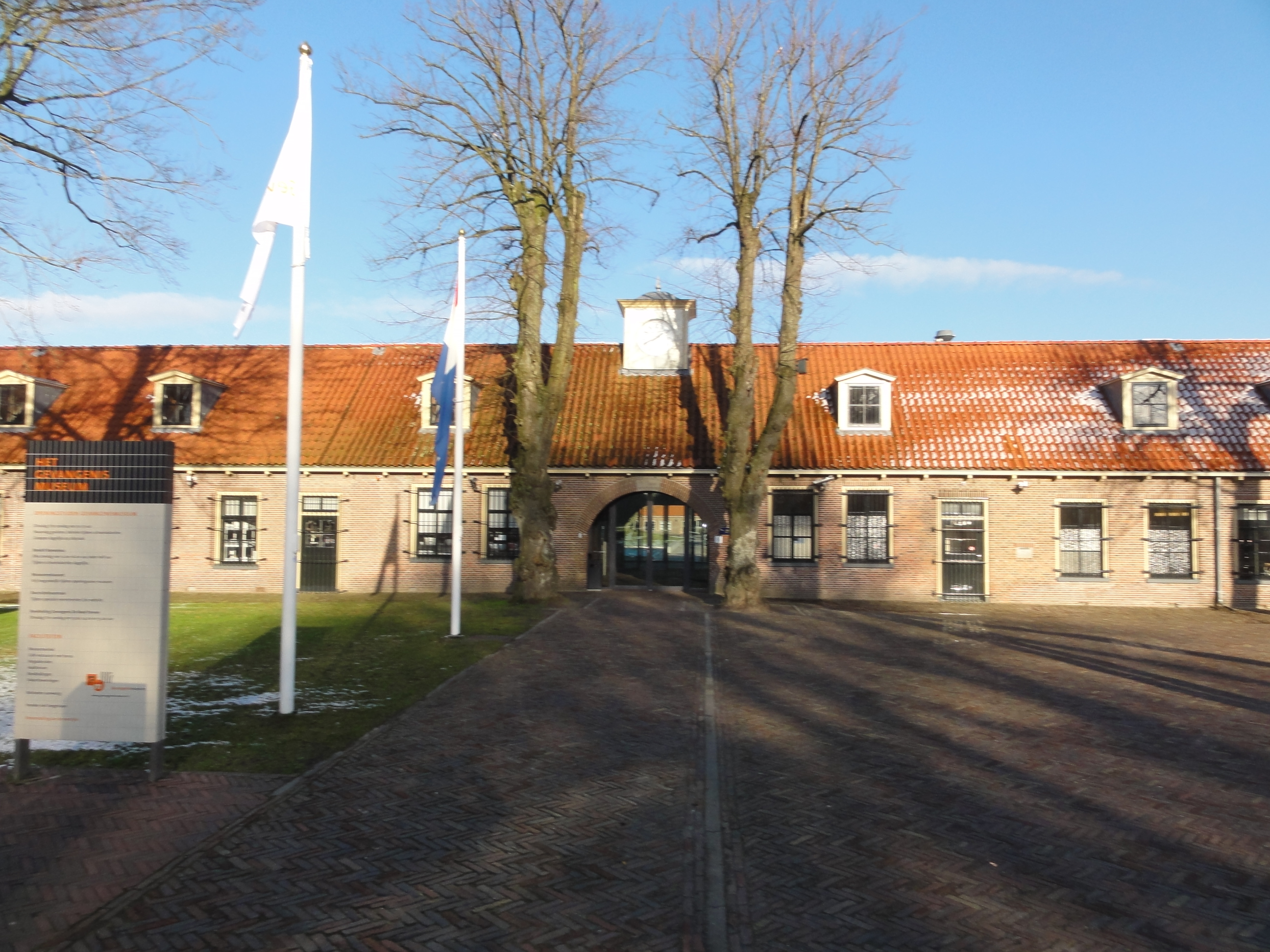
Nationaal Gevangenismuseum

Later in the 19th century the Maatschappij van Weldadigheid went broke and the whole complex/village was taken over by the Department of Justice for use as a penal colony, of which "complex nr. 2" is in use today by the Nationaal Gevangenismuseum (National Prison Museum). The (staff) houses are concentrated around the now two remaining prison complexes. The other prison buildings that were added in 1900 are still in use today (albeit modernized several times since). The windows of the buildings have educational texts in large sculptured sills on the front, about two stories high to educate the people working in and around them. The texts used to correspond with the intended inhabitant. The headmaster's house said "knowledge is power", and the pharmacist's house said "bitter and sweet".

Veenhuizen used to be closed off to everyone but the inmates and the staff and their families lived in housing (most now newly built in the 1970s, 80's and 90's) provided by the department. The village was treated as private companies grounds which also meant that the police had no jurisdiction there, meaning that moped-riding youth were thus exempt from traffic violations.

=== Village ===
Since 1984 the village is freely accessible for all and houses a tea-garden, a pub (for the very first time in its existence) as well as the national museum for correctional facilities.

The village is, despite its size, known throughout the Netherlands. Even national celebrities have done time there for driving while under the influence of alcohol. It has even been honoured by its own rendition of Johnny Cash's "San Quentin" song, in Dutch.

The whole village, including the museum and remnants of the original early 19th-century poorhouse-living project, was nominated to become a World Heritage Site in 2011 and was inscribed in 2021.

== Geography ==
Veenhuizen was in the municipality (or gemeente) Norg before it was reorganized to be part of a larger collection of municipalities including the larger village of Roden to become the municipality of Noordenveld (since 1998).

The larger cities in the area are Groningen, Assen (20 to 30 km), Amsterdam and Bremen, (Germany) (around 200 km). Veenhuizen has an altitude of about 7 metres.
