= Frederiksoord =

- Village
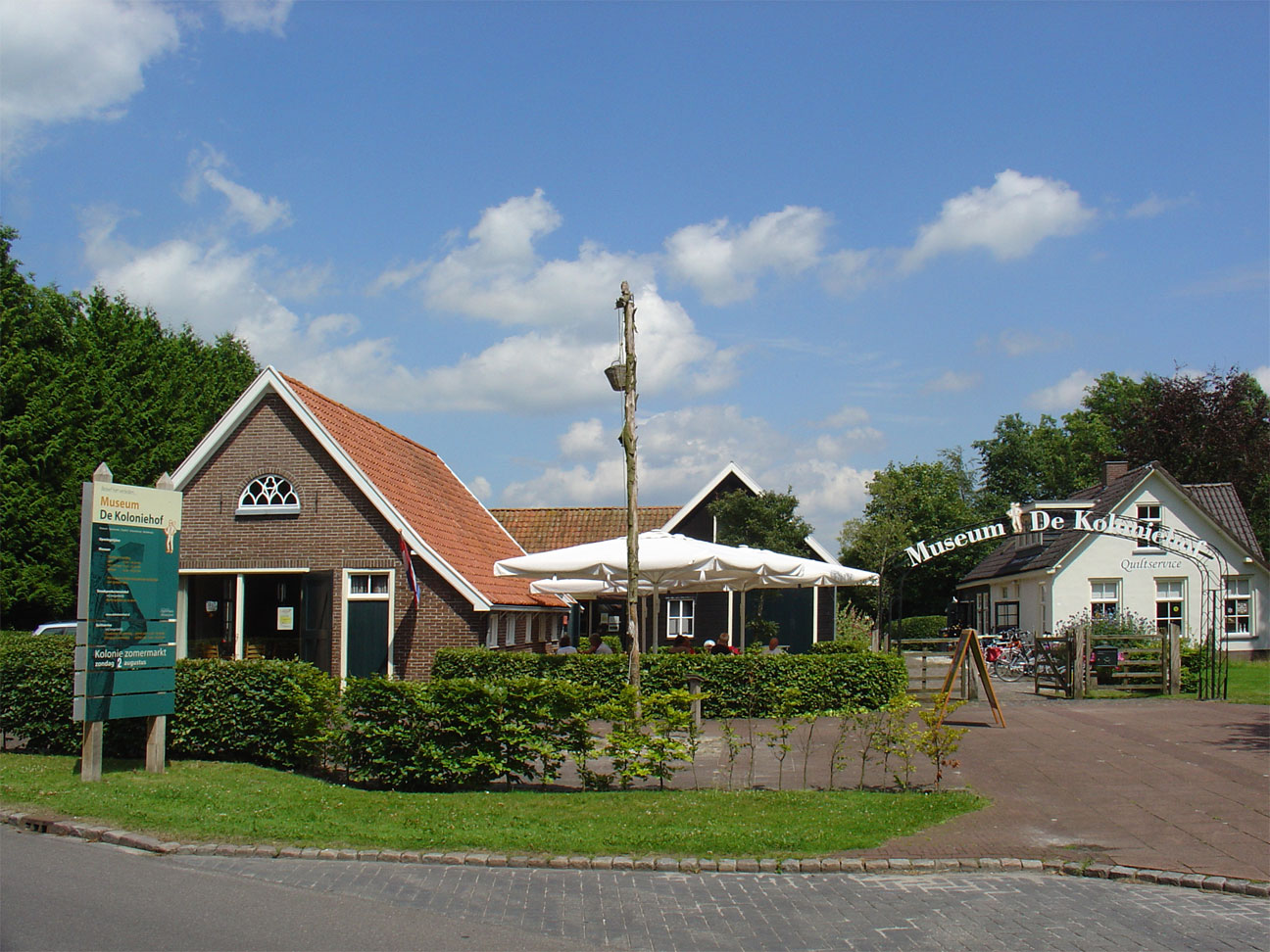
- Museum De Koloniehof

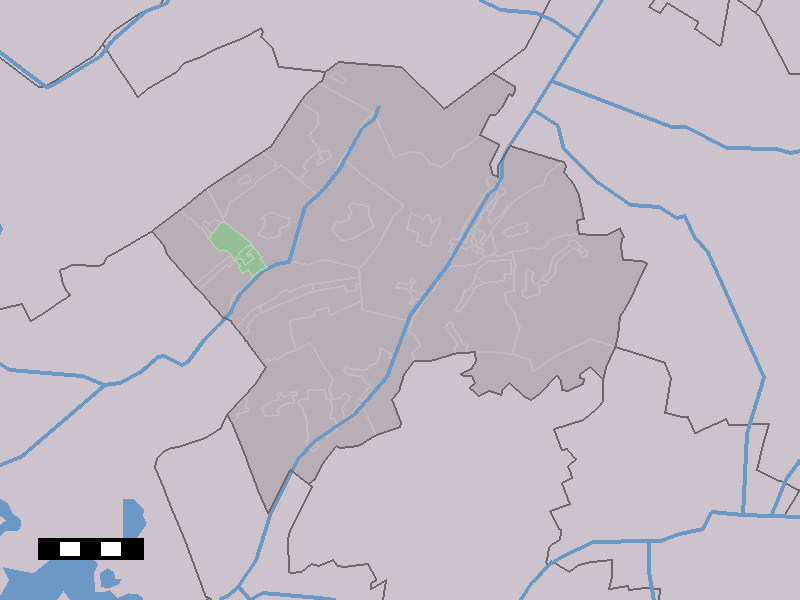
- The village centre (dark green) and the statistical district (light green) of Frederiksoord in the municipality of Westerveld.

- Location in province of Drenthe in the Netherlands Frederiksoord (Netherlands)
- Coordinates: 52°50′N 6°11′E
- Country: Netherlands
- Province: Drenthe
- Municipality: Westerveld

Area
  - Total: 3.22 km^{2} (1.24 sq mi)
- Elevation: 5 m (16 ft)

Population (2021)
  - Total: 305
  - Density: 94.7/km^{2} (245/sq mi)
- Time zone: UTC+1 (CET)
  - Summer (DST): UTC+2 (CEST)
- Postal code: 8382
- Dialing code: 0521
- Major roads: N353

Frederiksoord is a village in the Dutch province of Drenthe. It is a part of the municipality of Westerveld, and lies about 24 km northwest of Hoogeveen.

Frederiksoord was founded in 1818. It was the headquarters of the 19th century Society of Humanitarianism, an organization dedicated to eradicating poverty by providing work for the able-bodied poor in newly-built farming colonies. The name Frederiksoord comes from the patron of the organization: Prince Frederick of Orange-Nassau. Along with other colonies funded by the Society, Frederiksoord was inscribed on the UNESCO World Heritage List in 2021 for its testimony to a unique method of housing reform.

== Gallery ==
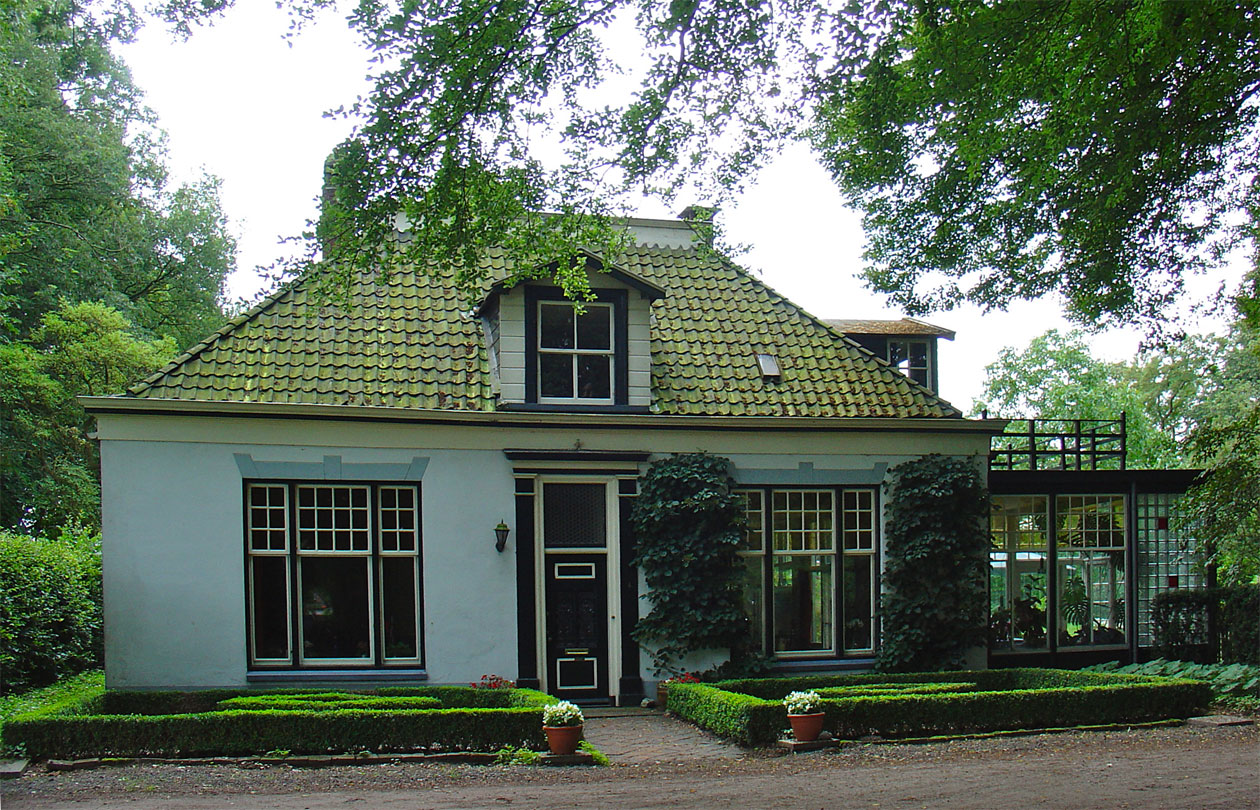
Former communal kitchen

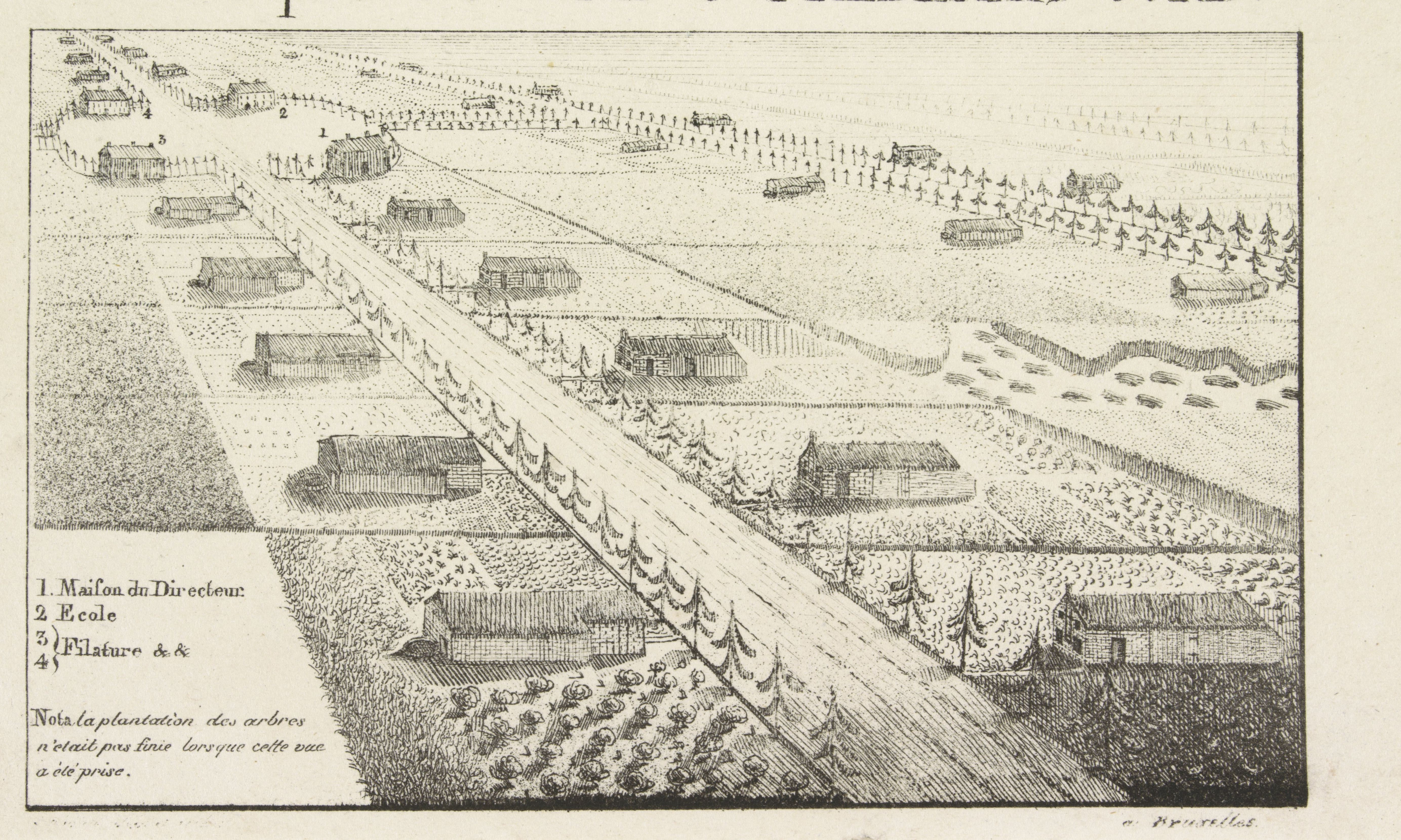
Drawing of colony (1818)

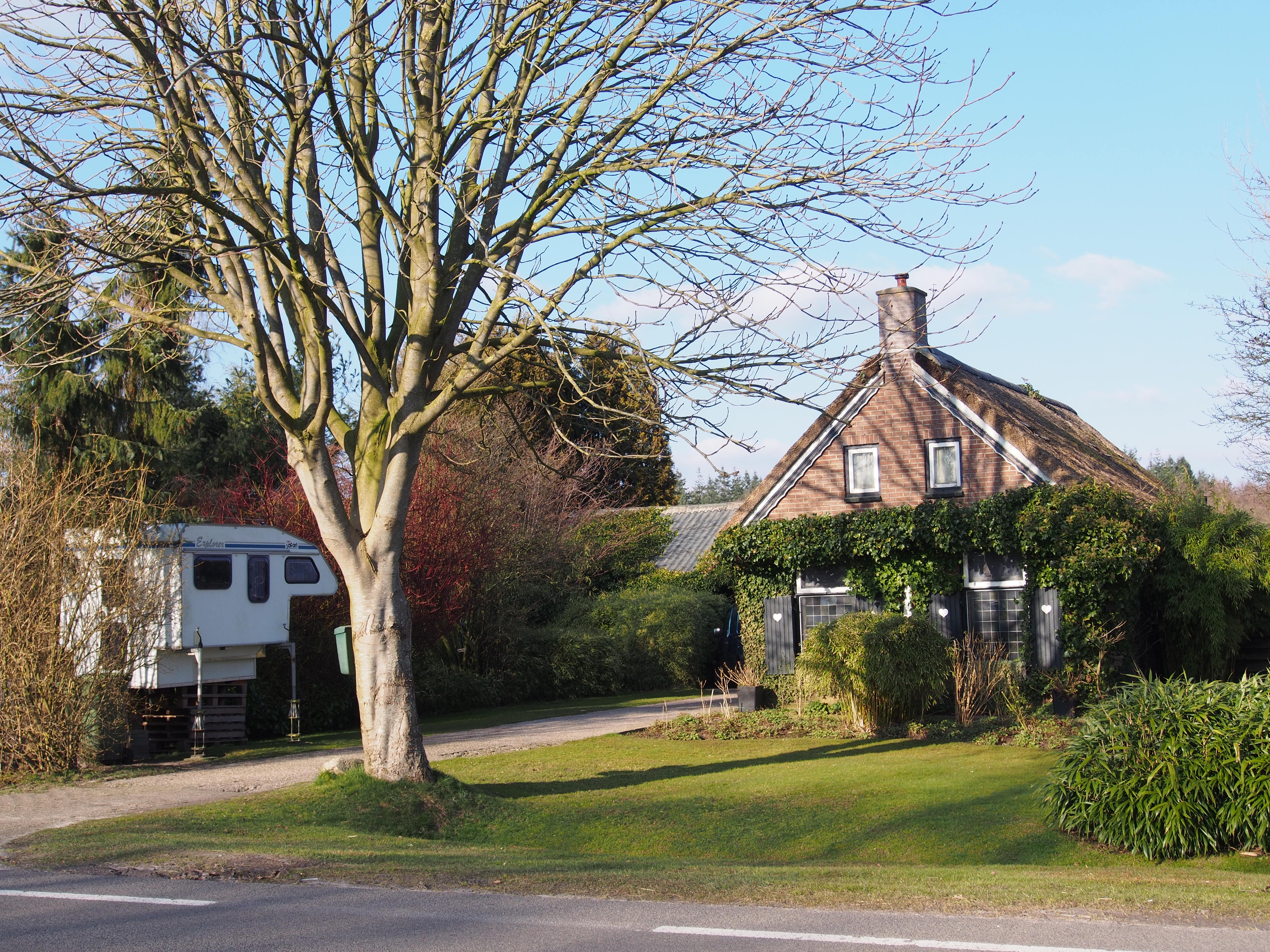
House in Frederiksoord

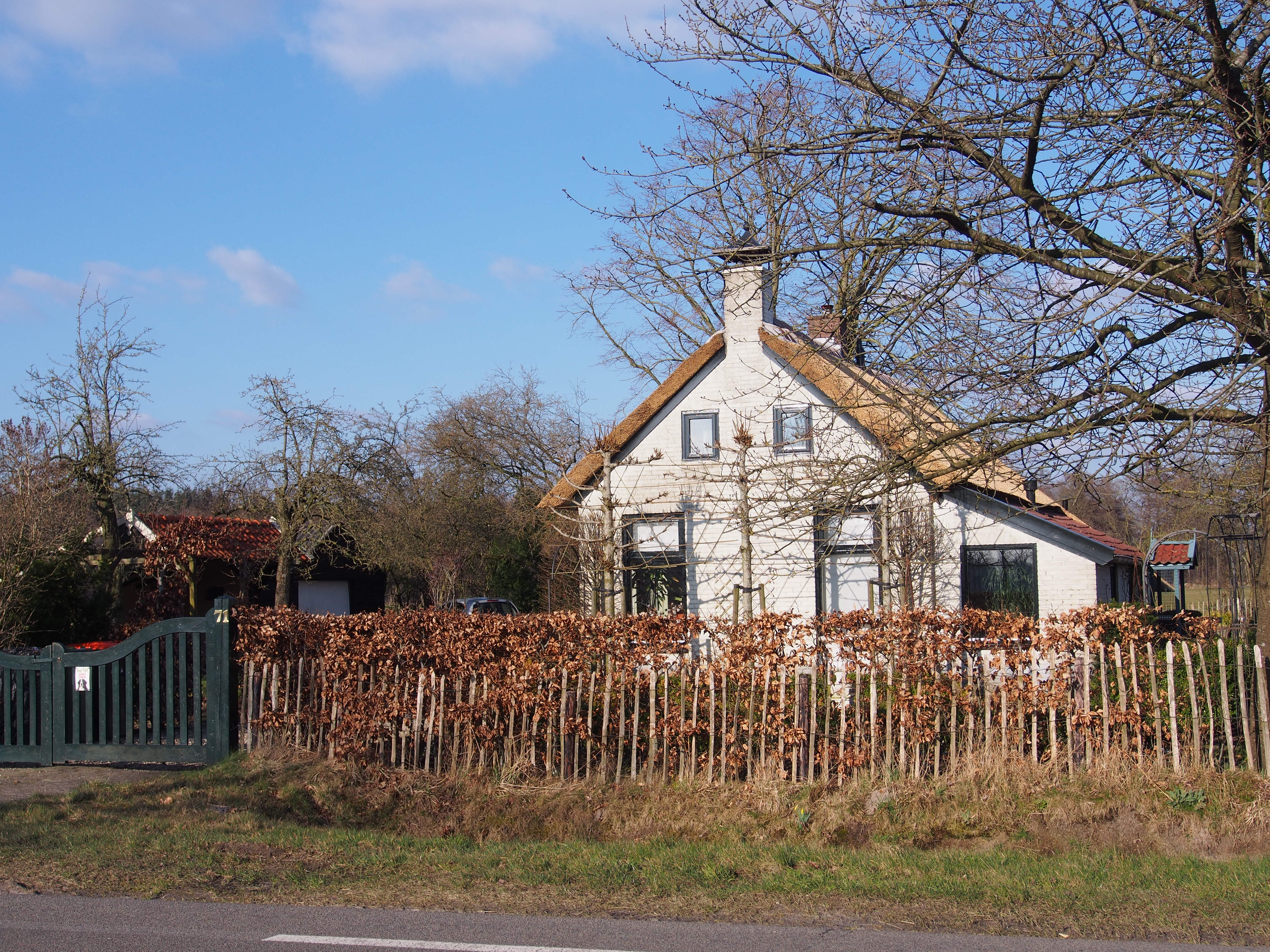
House in Frederiksoord
