= Wilhelminaoord =

- Village
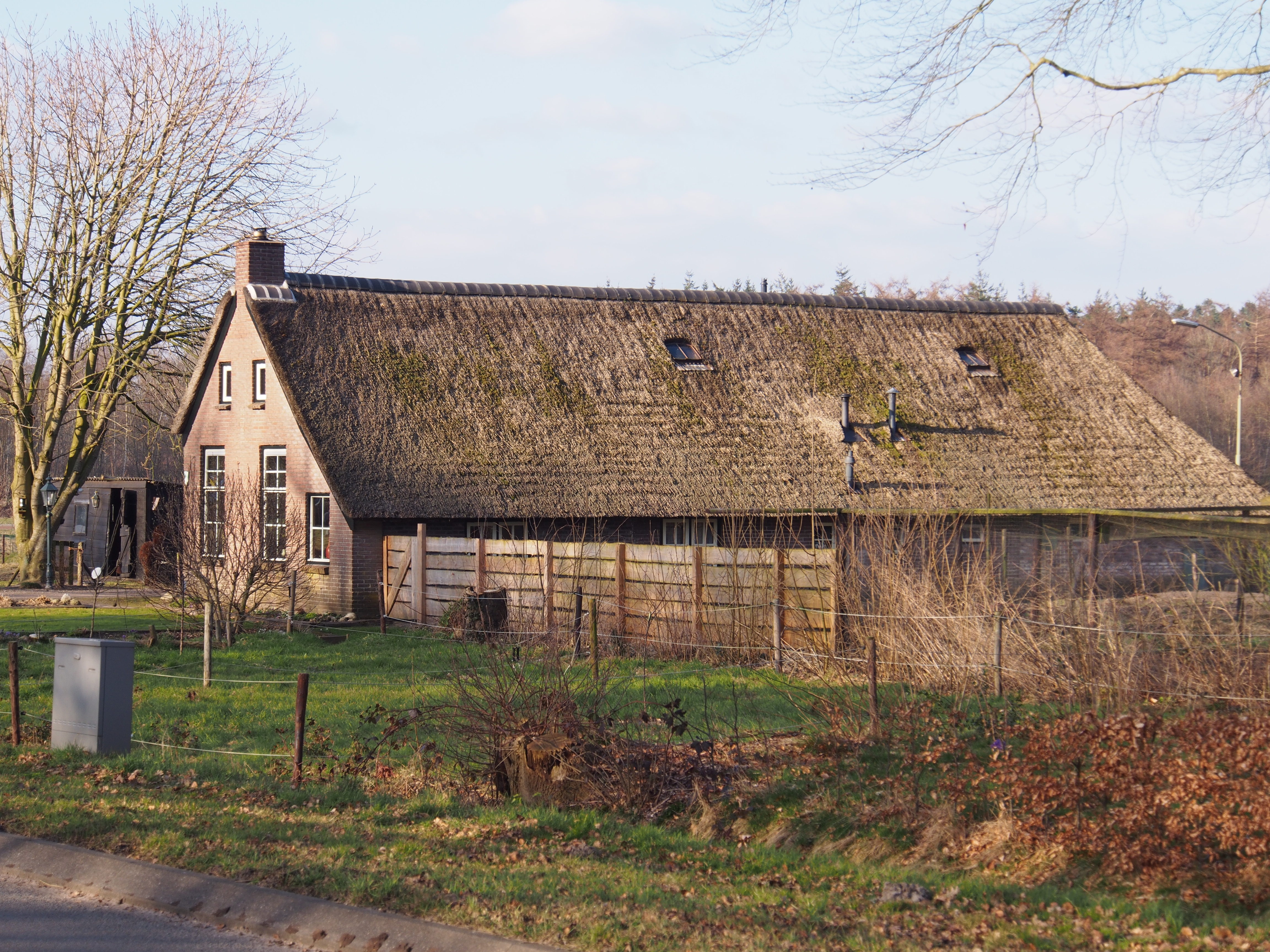
- Society Farmhouse in Wilhelminaoord

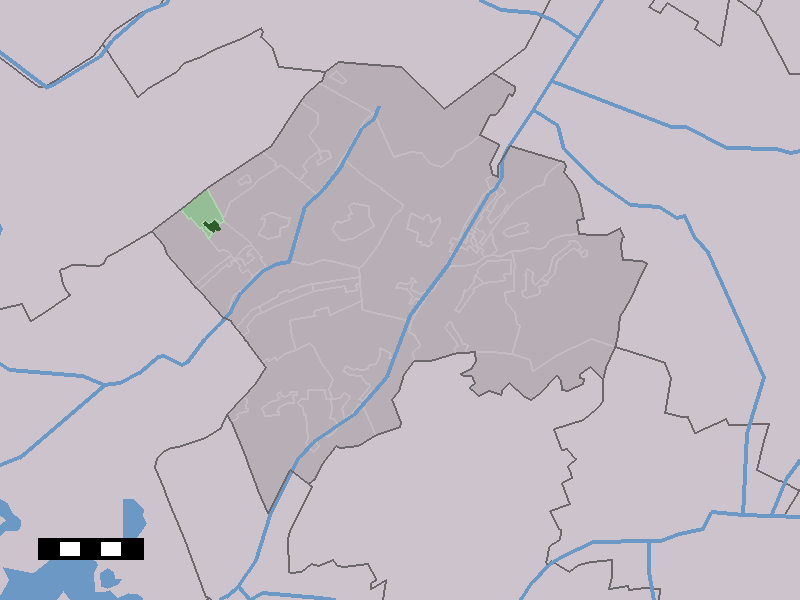
- The village centre (dark green) and the statistical district (light green) of Wilhelminaoord in the municipality of Westerveld.

- Location in province of Drenthe in the Netherlands Wilhelminaoord (Netherlands)
- Coordinates: 52°51′N 6°10′E
- Country: Netherlands
- Province: Drenthe
- Municipality: Westerveld
- Established: 1821

Area
  - Total: 2.49 km^{2} (0.96 sq mi)
- Elevation: 5 m (16 ft)

Population (2021)
  - Total: 935
  - Density: 376/km^{2} (973/sq mi)
- Time zone: UTC+1 (CET)
  - Summer (DST): UTC+2 (CEST)
- Postal code: 8384
- Dialing code: 0521
- Major roads: N353

UNESCO World Heritage Site
- Part of: Colonies of Benevolence
- Criteria: Cultural: ii, iv
- Reference: 1555bis-001
- Inscription: 2021 (44th Session)

Wilhelminaoord is a village in the Dutch province of Drenthe. It is a part of the municipality of Westerveld, and lies about 26 km northwest of Hoogeveen.

Wilhelminaoord was one of the farming colonies established by the Society of Benevolence in 1821 to decrease poverty by providing sustainable employment for able-bodied poor people. Along with the other colonies constructed by the Society, it was inscribed on the UNESCO World Heritage List in 2021 because of its testimony to a unique method of housing reform and its urban planning. The settlement was named after Wilhelmina of Prussia.

The Colony Church is a Dutch Reformed church which dates from 1853. Attendance used to be mandatory. In 2009, it was decommissioned and is nowadays used for weddings, conferences and parties.

== Gallery ==
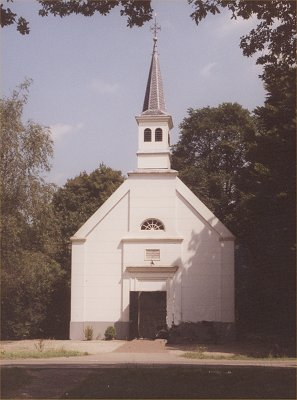
Church of Wilhelminaoord

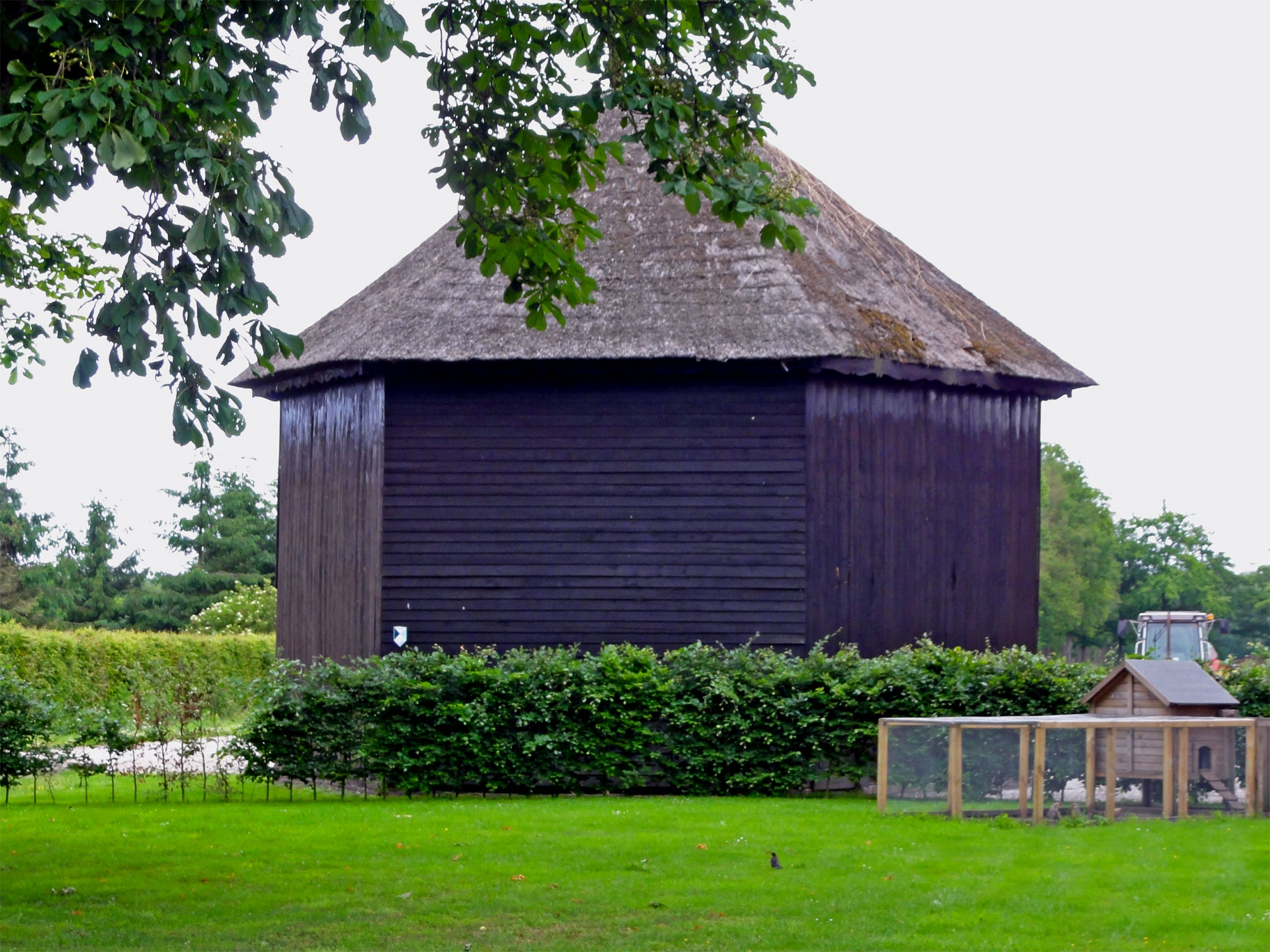
Hay shed

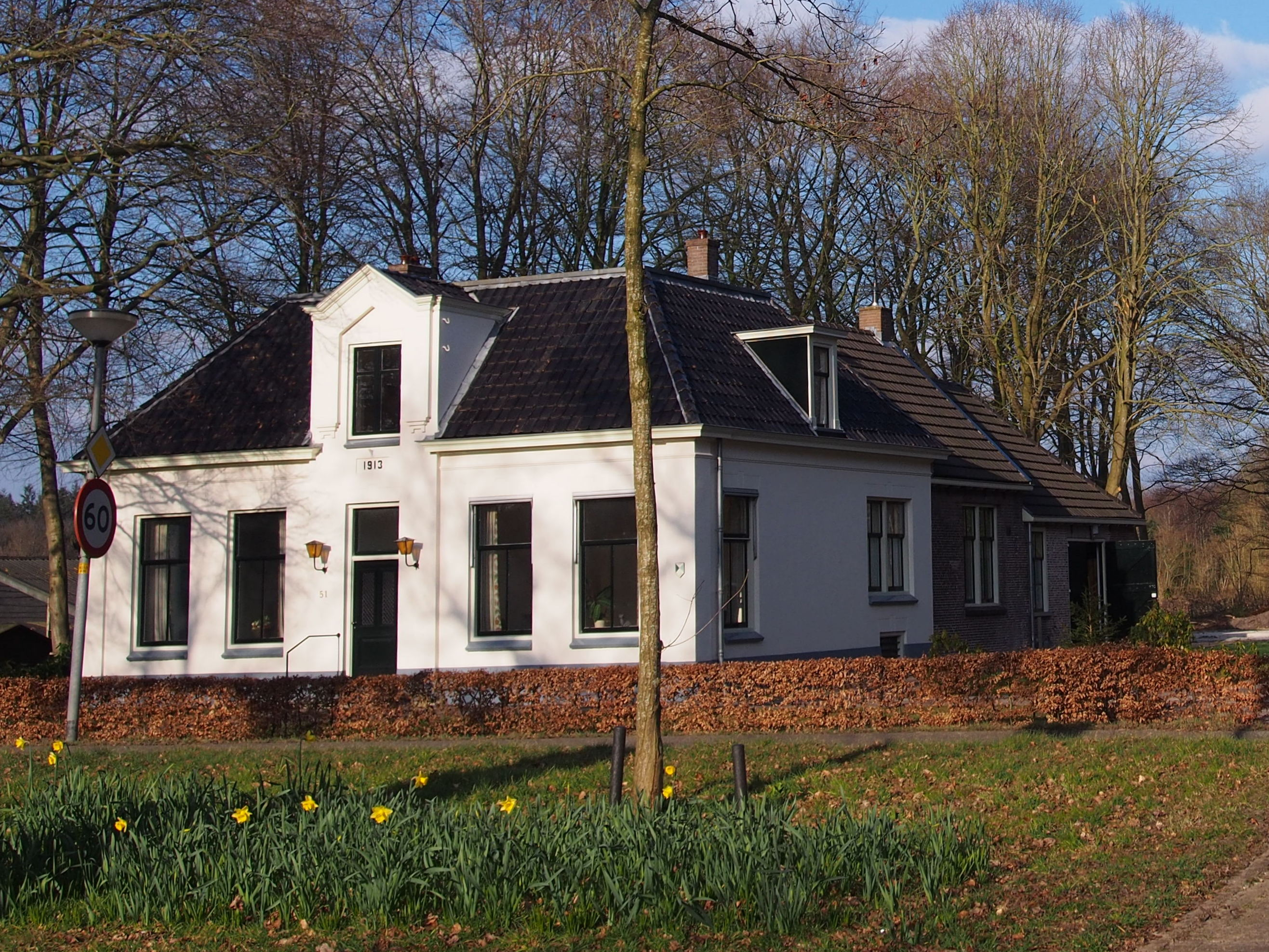
Farm in Wilhelminaoord

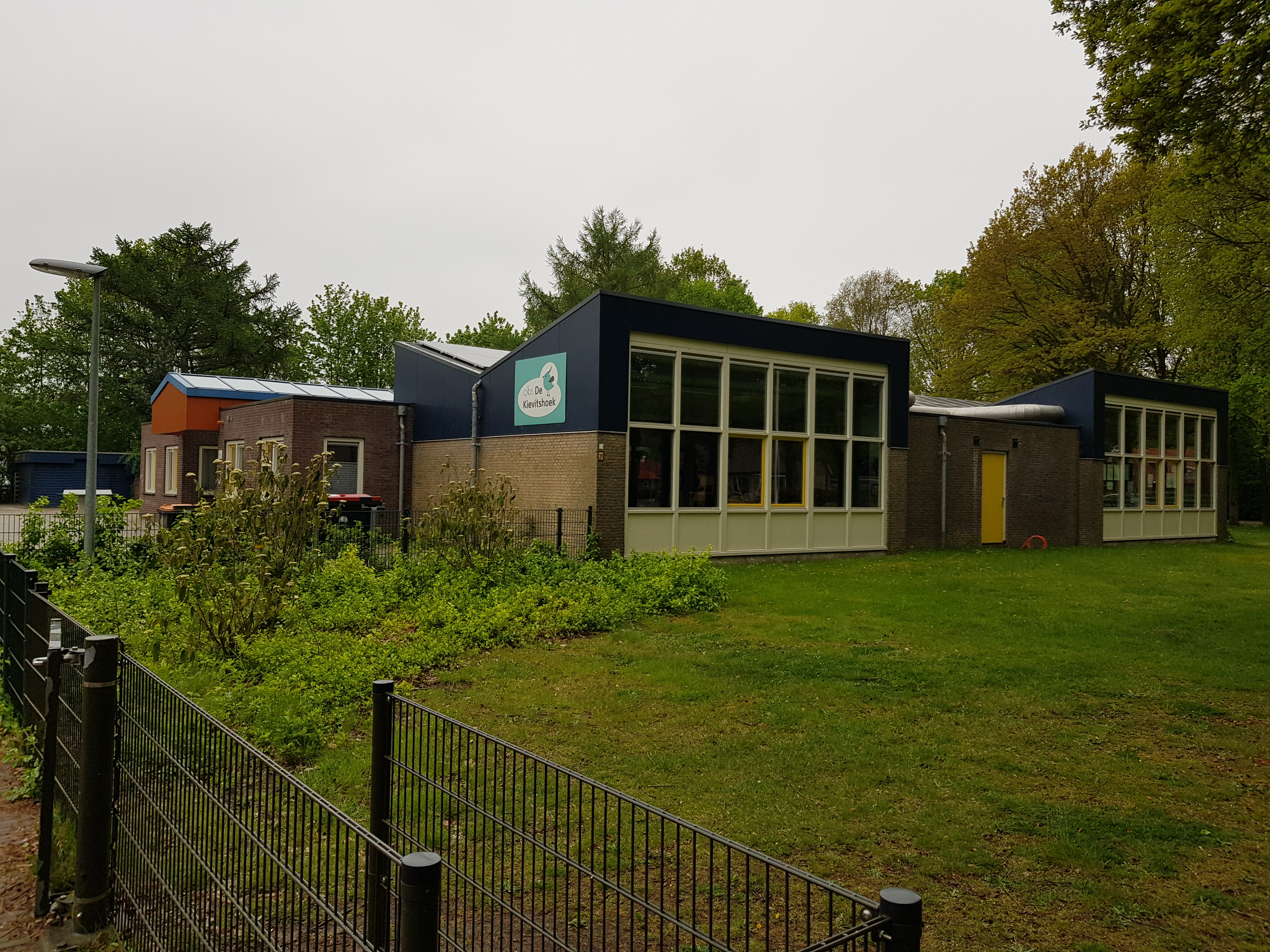
School
