= Society of Humanitarianism =

Colonies of Benevolence
UNESCO World Heritage Site
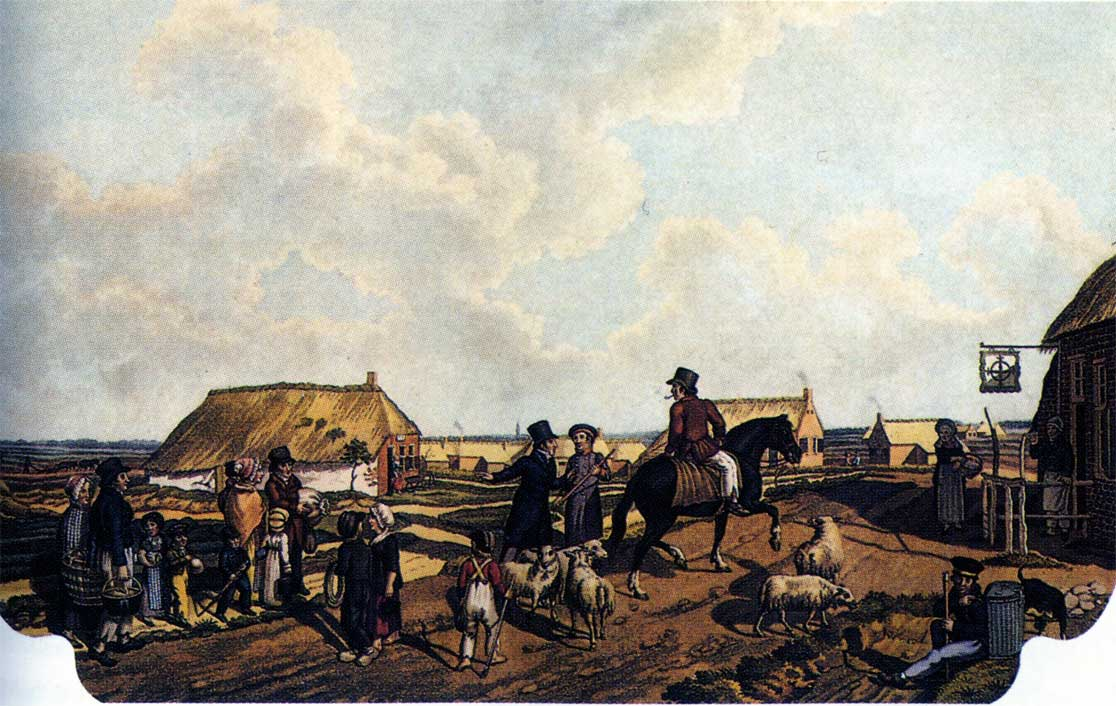
- Colonists in Willemsoord

- Location within Netherlands
- Location: Netherlands, Belgium
- Criteria: Cultural: (ii), (iv)
- Reference: 1555
- Inscription: 2021 (44th Session)
- Area: 2,012 ha (7.77 sq mi)
- Coordinates: 52.85728°N 6.192°E

The Society of Humanitarianism (Dutch: Maatschappij van Weldadigheid) was a Dutch private organization set up in 1818 by general Johannes van den Bosch to help poor families, mostly from the big cities, improve their lot in the aftermath of the Napoleonic French occupation by granting them farming land. He petitioned William I of the Netherlands for its formation and bought uncultivated land in Drenthe for the poor to exploit. The Estate 'Westerbeeksloot' in what is now Frederiksoord was the society's administrative center. The estate at Frederiksoord and the colonies built by the Society at Wilhelminaoord, Wortel and Veenhuizen were inscribed on the UNESCO World Heritage List in 2021 for their testimony to a unique 19th century philosophical movement and their outstanding urban planning.

== Background and aims ==
The Netherlands was severely depleted in the early nineteenth century, after the French domination. The Dutch East India Company had been dissolved in 1798, and the Dutch territory held along the Baltic sea was lost in 1806. This severely hampered both domestic and foreign trade. In addition, the early Industrial Revolution caused rapid population growth, especially in the cities which were ill-prepared to handle such growth. Finally, in 1815, Mount Tambora in Indonesia erupted, leading to a "year without summer" in 1816, in which many crops failed to produce. Many families lived in the cities and in the countryside in abject poverty. Building on the philosophy of the Enlightenment and the prevailing culture of colonialism at the time, Johannes van den Bosch he recognized this problem and attempted to implement a domestic colonization scheme where the poor would be provided a place to live and work off of the land. He developed the "Society of Humanitarianism" in order to achieve that goal.

The Society of Humanitarianism attempted to address the root causes of poverty, offering sustainable employed for all able-bodied poor people. The colonies were supposed to be self-sustainable, with unskilled paupers being educated and reformed into "ideal citizens". However, the Society was not meant to care for people who were unable to work, but rather for those who were unwilling to. van den Bosch wrote:

We do not feel it incumbent upon ourselves to deal with poverty in general, or with all its manifestations. However, those who are born connected with, or in a state of, defencelessness or outright inability to labour, must of course be and remain subject to local care of civil Government, of the existing charity institutions, or of such Councils for assistance to the poor as have been established for centuries by the various religious denominations, for the support of its impoverished fellow believers. That poverty alone, which springs from lack of employment while willing and able to perform labour, in my opinion demands and deserves our attention, to the extent that we are indivisible and participating citizens of a free State, because it is susceptible, through the collaboration of particular persons, to be positively combated, at times reduced, and perhaps once completely overcome, at least be contained within those limits where it will cease to be burdensome and even dangerous for society.

== Trial Colony ==
Johannes van den Bosch went energetically to work. On August 25, 1818 - one week after the purchase of the property by the Estate Westerbeeksloot near modern-day Frederiksoord - he laid the foundation stone for the first settlers home. On October 29, 1818, the first families arrived in the colony, which was still a "trial colony". A total of 52 families from all parts of the country were selected to participate in the experiment of Johannes van den Bosch. After four and a half years, there were still 42 families under the care of the Society of Humanitarianism. A large part of them lived there until their death, and their adventures are described by Wil Schackmann in "De Proefkolonie"[2].

== Free vs. "Unfree" Colonies ==
After the success of the trial colony, the Society then built permanent colonies The first colonies were later transformed into the village Frederiksoord, and the other colonies into the villages Wilhelminaoord and Boschoord (in Southwest Drenthe) and Willemsoord (in Northwest Overijssel). These "free" colonies were primarily for sponsored families and were developed with the intention that the families would run small, self-sufficient farms under supervision. Each colony consisted of small houses that were regularly spaced along straight roads. These houses were modest but probably provided better accommodation than the tenants were used to.

To educate the population and safeguarding of bad influences, the Society founded its own schools and they implemented "colony money". The Society also founded vocational training schools which operated from 1829 to 1859 as the 'Institute for Agriculture' in Wateren and the "Gerard Adriaan van Swieten" horticultural and forestry school in Frederiksoord and the "Gerard Adriaan van Swieten" Agricultural School in 1884 in Willemsoord. The foundation of these schools was made possible by a donation from the former major of cavalry, F.H. L.van Swieten. [3]. The horticultural school moved to Meppel in November 2005.

In contrast to the "free colonies", the "unfree colonies" were for beggars, vagrants, and orphans, and were strictly communal. Every activity was carried out as part of a group and under constant supervision. Women and men slept separately in hammocks, in large halls holding up to 40 people at a time. Two of these unfree colonies were Veenhuizen and Ommerschans. The punishment was for alcohol abuse, sexual abuse, waste, brutality or desertion. In 1859 the colonies were taken over by the Dutch state. In 1890 Ommerschans was closed. Veenhuizen is now an ordinary prison.

From 1896 to 1901 the description sheet was introduced in Veenhuizen. The creator of this system was the Frenchman Alphonse Bertillon (1853-1917). He was of the opinion that on basis of accurate measurements, the identity of the individual could be recorded. On this simple theoretical principle Bertillon built a complicated identification method, in which body measurements were central. Because human individuals cannot be described in numbers only, additional descriptions on the description sheet were necessary.

At their peak from 1818 to 1911, 11,000 people lived in the colonies in the Netherlands, and 6,000 in Belgium.

== Renegade Colonies ==
Some (especially young people) that were ousted from the colony settled in the vicinity in hastily built sod huts and formed the so-called renegade-like colonies in near Nijensleek and Vledderveen (which originates from the renegate colonies), North or South Wolde-Marijenkampen (at Steenwijk) and Noordwolde. [5]

== Criticism of the colonies ==
Johannes van den Bosch's project suffered depletion, because he always had to borrow to keep the Colonies in state money because of the disappointing yields. For the settlers, being placed in the so-called "free colonies" meant a great intervention in their lives. Many were from the big city 'transplanted' in an unfamiliar environment to them as the Drenthe countryside. Some managed to save well but others went back to the place of origin.The settler Peter Arends found that life in the colony was advertised as being better than it really was. When he complained about this in a letter to his sister the director in charge of the colony (Benjamin van den Bosch, brother of John) got to hear about this and gave him in a big scolding from called him "a big stupid sloth. Eventually Arends was still able to become a free farmer in Ommerschans.

The maintenance of the colonies received some of its strongest criticism from conservative Christians. In particular, the Reveil movement felt that man was not allowed to intervene God's designated plan. Dirk van Hogendorp, pupil of Willem Bilderdijk, who visited the colonies with his friend Jacob van Lennep, felt that the Society of Humanitarianism, because it was not a religious organization, would not last long. Also Isaac da Costa and Ottho Gerhard Heldring were fierce fighters of the ideas of Van den Bosch. In their view, the poor and needy were a natural part of society so that the rich and wealthy could show their mercy as a token of Christian charity.

== Southern Netherlands ==
Following the Drenthe colonies there were also colonies developed with similar initiatives in the Southern Netherlands. In Wortel a free colony in 1822 and in Merksplas an unfree colony was founded by Johannes van den Bosch. The colony in Wortel was completely demolished after the Belgian Revolution. This location was a tramp institution established in 1881, which still has limited service as such today. The colony of Merksplas is now a prison and a center for rejected asylum seekers.

== Present day ==
In the 20th century residential schools for "unsocials" were established in the major cities. They later became obsolete, and the last of them were closed down in the mid-1970s. The Society for Humanitarians was transformed into a foundation, which is responsible for the management of 1400 acres of cultured and forestry land, including a part of the National Park Drents-Friese Wold. In the museum "De Proefkolonie" in Frederiksoord the Society shows what life in the colonies was like. There is a database with the names of persons who lived as settlers or as officers in the colonies or who worked there. In Veenhuizen the National Prison Museum is located in a former work institution at Oude Gracht 1.

== See also ==
Similar planned working communities

- New Harmony, Indiana
- New Lanark
